= Molodyozhny (inhabited locality) =

Molodyozhny (Russian: Молодёжный; masculine), Molodyozhnaya (Молодёжная; feminine), or Molodyozhnoye (Молодёжное; neuter) is the name of several inhabited localities in Russia.

== Modern localities ==
=== Altai Krai ===
As of 2012, two rural localities in Altai Krai bear this name:

- Molodyozhny, Pavlovsky District, Altai Krai, a settlement in Kolyvansky Selsoviet of Pavlovsky District; 53°3′N 82°44′E
- Molodyozhny, Rebrikhinsky District, Altai Krai, a settlement in Panovsky Selsoviet of Rebrikhinsky District; 52°59′N 82°8′E

=== Chuvash Republic ===
As of 2012, one rural locality in the Chuvash Republic bears this name:

- Molodyozhny, Chuvash Republic, a settlement in Mikhaylovskoye Rural Settlement of Tsivilsky District

=== Irkutsk Oblast ===
As of 2012, two rural localities in Irkutsk Oblast bear this name:

- Molodyozhny, Irkutsky District, Irkutsk Oblast, a settlement in Irkutsky District
- Molodyozhny, Zhigalovsky District, Irkutsk Oblast, a settlement in Zhigalovsky District

=== Republic of Kalmykia ===
As of 2012, two rural localities in the Republic of Kalmykia bear this name:

- Molodyozhny, Priyutnensky District, Republic of Kalmykia, a settlement in Oktyabrskaya Rural Administration of Priyutnensky District; 46°22′N 43°0′E
- Molodyozhny, Yashkulsky District, Republic of Kalmykia, a settlement in Molodezhnenskaya Rural Administration of Yashkulsky District; 46°36′N 46°14′E

=== Kaluga Oblast ===
As of 2012, one rural locality in Kaluga Oblast bears this name:

- Molodyozhny, Kaluga Oblast, a settlement in Meshchovsky District

=== Khabarovsk Krai ===
As of 2012, one rural locality in Khabarovsk Krai bears this name:

- Molodyozhny, Khabarovsk Krai, a settlement in Komsomolsky District

=== Kostroma Oblast ===
As of 2012, three rural localities in Kostroma Oblast bear this name:

- Molodyozhny, Krasnoselsky District, Kostroma Oblast, a settlement in Borovikovskoye Settlement of Krasnoselsky District
- Molodyozhny, Nerekhtsky District, Kostroma Oblast, a settlement in Prigorodnoye Settlement of Nerekhtsky District
- Molodyozhny, Parfenyevsky District, Kostroma Oblast, a settlement in Parfenyevskoye Settlement of Parfenyevsky District

=== Krasnodar Krai ===
As of 2012, one rural locality in Krasnodar Krai bears this name:

- Molodyozhny, Krasnodar Krai, a settlement in Chernigovsky Rural Okrug of Belorechensky District

=== Moscow Oblast ===
As of 2012, two inhabited localities in Moscow Oblast bear this name:

- Molodyozhny, Moscow Oblast, an urban locality (a settlement) under the administrative jurisdiction of the closed administrative-territorial formation of the same name
- Molodyozhny, Podolsky District, Moscow Oblast, a rural locality (a settlement) in Lagovskoye Rural Settlement of Podolsky District

=== Nizhny Novgorod Oblast ===
As of 2012, one rural locality in Nizhny Novgorod Oblast bears this name:

- Molodyozhny, Nizhny Novgorod Oblast, a settlement in Ababkovsky Selsoviet of Pavlovsky District

=== Omsk Oblast ===
As of 2012, one rural locality in Omsk Oblast bears this name:

- Molodyozhnoye, Omsk Oblast, a village in Pobedovsky Rural Okrug of Novovarshavsky District

=== Orenburg Oblast ===
As of 2012, one rural locality in Orenburg Oblast bears this name:

- Molodyozhny, Orenburg Oblast, a settlement in Molodyozhny Selsoviet of Totsky District

=== Primorsky Krai ===
As of 2012, one rural locality in Primorsky Krai bears this name:

- Molodyozhnoye, Primorsky Krai, a selo in Krasnoarmeysky District

=== Rostov Oblast ===
As of 2012, two rural localities in Rostov Oblast bear this name:

- Molodyozhny, Kamensky District, Rostov Oblast, a settlement in Astakhovskoye Rural Settlement of Kamensky District
- Molodyozhny, Krasnosulinsky District, Rostov Oblast, a settlement in Mikhaylovskoye Rural Settlement of Krasnosulinsky District

=== Ryazan Oblast ===
As of 2012, two rural localities in Ryazan Oblast bear this name:

- Molodyozhny, Miloslavsky District, Ryazan Oblast, a settlement in Olshansky Rural Okrug of Miloslavsky District
- Molodyozhny, Sasovsky District, Ryazan Oblast, a settlement in Temgenevsky Rural Okrug of Sasovsky District

=== Saint Petersburg ===
As of 2012, one urban locality in Saint Petersburg bears this name:

- Molodyozhnoye, Saint Petersburg, a municipal settlement in Kurortny District

=== Sakhalin Oblast ===
As of 2012, one rural locality in Sakhalin Oblast bears this name:

- Molodyozhnoye, Sakhalin Oblast, a selo in Tymovsky District

=== Saratov Oblast ===
As of 2012, one rural locality in Saratov Oblast bears this name:

- Molodyozhny, Saratov Oblast, a settlement in Perelyubsky District

=== Sverdlovsk Oblast ===
As of 2012, two rural localities in Sverdlovsk Oblast bear this name:

- Molodyozhny, Beryozovsky, Sverdlovsk Oblast, a settlement under the administrative jurisdiction of the City of Beryozovsky
- Molodyozhny, Prigorodny District, Sverdlovsk Oblast, a settlement in Prigorodny District

=== Tambov Oblast ===
As of 2012, one rural locality in Tambov Oblast bears this name:

- Molodyozhny, Tambov Oblast, a settlement in Algasovsky Selsoviet of Morshansky District

=== Republic of Tatarstan ===
As of 2012, one rural locality in the Republic of Tatarstan bears this name:

- Molodyozhny, Republic of Tatarstan, a settlement in Almetyevsky District

=== Tomsk Oblast ===
As of 2012, two rural localities in Tomsk Oblast bear this name:

- Molodyozhny, Kargasoksky District, Tomsk Oblast, a settlement in Kargasoksky District
- Molodyozhny, Tomsky District, Tomsk Oblast, a settlement in Tomsky District

=== Tula Oblast ===
As of 2012, one rural locality in Tula Oblast bears this name:

- Molodyozhny, Tula Oblast, a settlement in Medvensky Rural Okrug of Leninsky District

=== Volgograd Oblast ===
As of 2012, one rural locality in Volgograd Oblast bears this name:

- Molodyozhny, Volgograd Oblast, a settlement in Zelenovsky Selsoviet of Bykovsky District

=== Vologda Oblast ===
As of 2012, two rural localities in Vologda Oblast bear this name:

- Molodyozhny, Nikolsky District, Vologda Oblast, a settlement in Polezhayevsky Selsoviet of Nikolsky District
- Molodyozhny, Vozhegodsky District, Vologda Oblast, a settlement in Maryinsky Selsoviet of Vozhegodsky District

=== Voronezh Oblast ===
As of 2012, one rural locality in Voronezh Oblast bears this name:

- Molodyozhny, Voronezh Oblast, a settlement in Novopostoyalovskoye Rural Settlement of Rossoshansky District

=== Zabaykalsky Krai ===
As of 2012, one rural locality in Zabaykalsky Krai bears this name:

- Molodyozhny, Zabaykalsky Krai, a settlement in Priargunsky District

== Abolished localities ==
- Molodyozhny, Udmurt Republic, a pochinok in Yakshursky Selsoviet of Zavyalovsky District; abolished in June 2013
