= Zavolzhsky (rural locality) =

Name for several Russian rural localities

Zavolzhsky (Russian: Заво́лжский; masculine), Zavolzhskaya (Заво́лжская; feminine), or Zavolzhskoye (Заво́лжское; neuter) is the name of several rural localities in Russia:

- Zavolzhsky, Samara Oblast, a settlement in Bezenchuksky District of Samara Oblast
- Zavolzhsky, Saratov Oblast, a settlement in Pugachyovsky District of Saratov Oblast
- Zavolzhsky, Kalininsky District, Tver Oblast, a settlement in Kalininsky District of Tver Oblast
- Zavolzhsky, Rzhevsky District, Tver Oblast, a settlement in Rzhevsky District of Tver Oblast
- Zavolzhsky, Bykovsky District, Volgograd Oblast, a settlement in Kislovsky Selsoviet of Bykovsky District of Volgograd Oblast
- Zavolzhsky, Nikolayevsky District, Volgograd Oblast, a settlement in Berezhnovsky Selsoviet of Nikolayevsky District of Volgograd Oblast
- Zavolzhsky, Pallasovsky District, Volgograd Oblast, a settlement in Zavolzhsky Selsoviet of Pallasovsky District of Volgograd Oblast
- Zavolzhskoye, a selo in Zavolzhsky Selsoviet of Kharabalinsky District of Astrakhan Oblast
