= Kobeituz =

Lake Kobeituz
- Көбейтұз
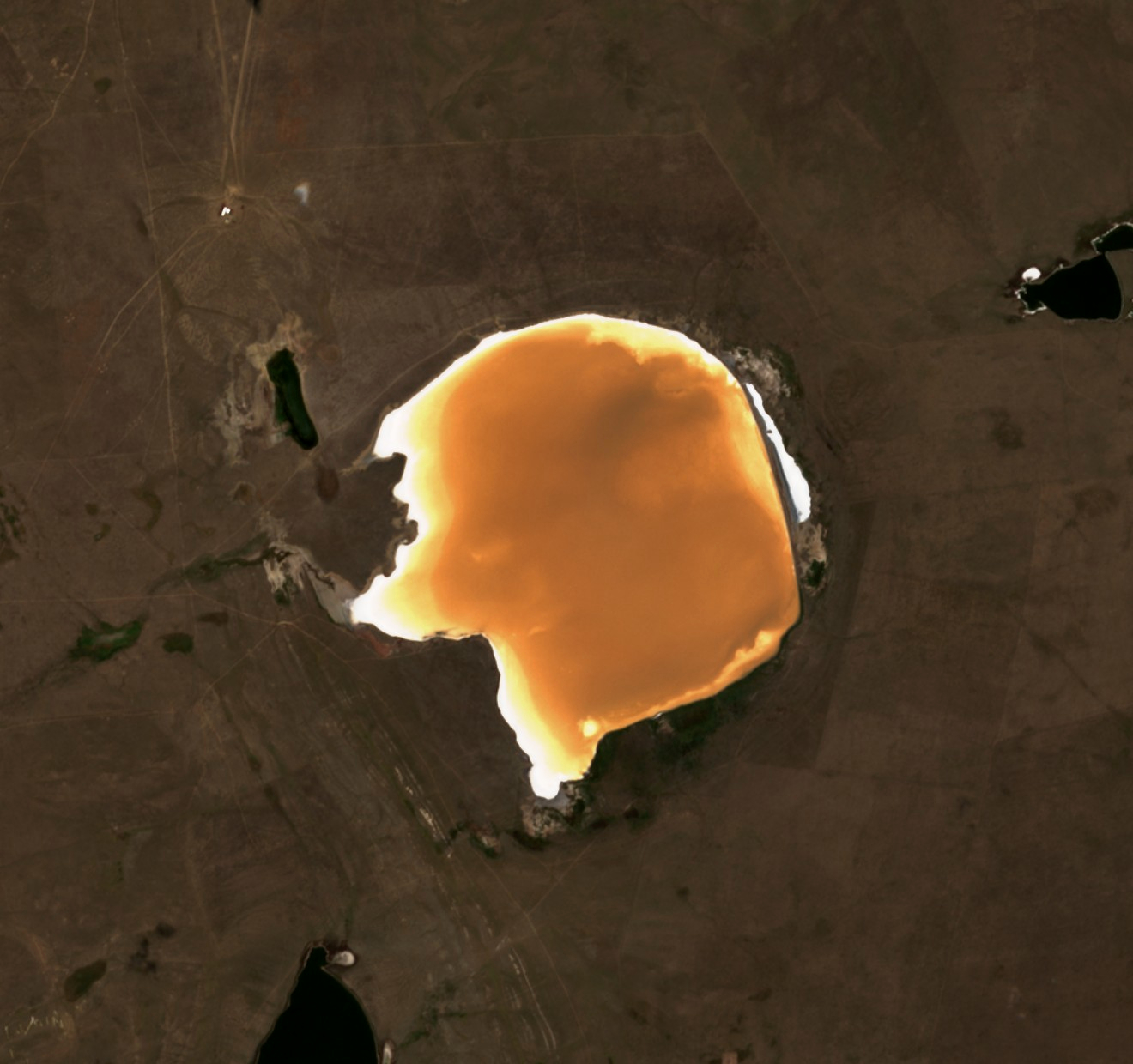
- Sentinel-2 image (2019)

- Location within Kazakhstan
- Location: Akmola Region
- Coordinates: 51°44′33″N 73°32′51″E
- Type: Salt lake
- Max. length: 2.9 kilometers (1.8 mi)
- Max. width: 2.3 kilometers (1.4 mi)
- Surface elevation: 253 meters (830 ft)

Kobeituz (Kazakh: Көбейтұз көлі) is a salt lake in Yereymentau District, Akmola Region Kazakhstan.

The lake lies northeast of the city of Yereymentau. The origins of the name come from the local Kazakh language in which "kobei" means multiply and "tuz" means salt.

== Description ==
Kobeituz is located in the basin of Teniz, a salt lake part of the Olenti river basin. It lies at an altitude of 253 meters (830 ft) above sea level, 3.5 kilometers (2.2 mi) to the east of the eastern lakeshore of lake Teniz. Lake Maysor lies 47 kilometers (29 mi) to the ENE.

Kobeituz is a pink lake owing to the presence of Dunaliella salina, an algae species giving the water its pink tint. This is likely because it is present in several other lakes around the world that have high salt concentrations and turn pink during warm months when the salinity is at its highest. The alga has different structures and appearances depending on the surrounding conditions, and in high-salinity environments like Lake Kobeituz it produces carotenoids that have a reddish hue.

== Popularity ==
Due to the high concentration of salt, the water of Kobeituz could keep a person afloat, as in the Dead Sea. But swimming in it is unrealistic: the lake is very shallow, the maximum depth is only about 20 cm, that is, you can enter the water only knee-deep. Mostly young people come here for beautiful photographs. Moreover, in order for the color of Kobeituz to be as bright as possible, it is recommended to travel in sunny weather. They say that it is then that microorganisms most actively release their pigment.

== Infrastructure ==
There is currently no infrastructure or visitor facilities at the lake.
