= Teniz, Yereymentau District =

Lake in Kazakhstan

Teniz
- Теңіз
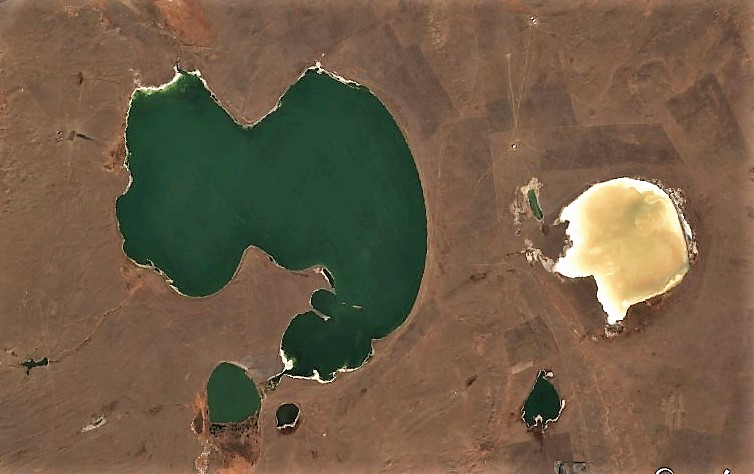
- Sentinel-2 image of lakes Teniz and Kobeituz

- Location within Kazakhstan
- Location: Yereymentau District
- Coordinates: 51°45′N 73°25′E
- Type: endorheic
- Basin countries: Kazakhstan
- Max. length: 7.6 kilometers (4.7 mi)
- Max. width: 5.1 kilometers (3.2 mi)
- Surface area: 31.5 square kilometers (12.2 sq mi)
- Residence time: UTC+6
- Surface elevation: 260 meters (850 ft)

Teniz (Kazakh: Теңіз; Russian: Тениз) is a bittern salt lake in Yereymentau District, Akmola Region, Kazakhstan.

Yereymentau lies 20 kilometers (12 mi) to the southwest. Teniz is part of an Important Bird Area and the Buiratau National Park, a protected area, lies to the south of the lake.

== Geography ==
Teniz is an endorheic lake in the basin of the Olenti river, 18 kilometers (11 mi) northeast of the Yereymentau Mountains. The lake has two prominent headlands, one on the northern shore and the other on the southern, dividing the lake into wide bays and a peninsula.

Teniz is located in a depression 3.5 kilometers (2.2 mi) west of lake Kobeituz, its smaller and more well-known neighbor. Lake Maysor lies 53 kilometers (33 mi) to the ENE. There are also other lakes nearby, all of them smaller, such as Kurbetkol close to the southeastern end.

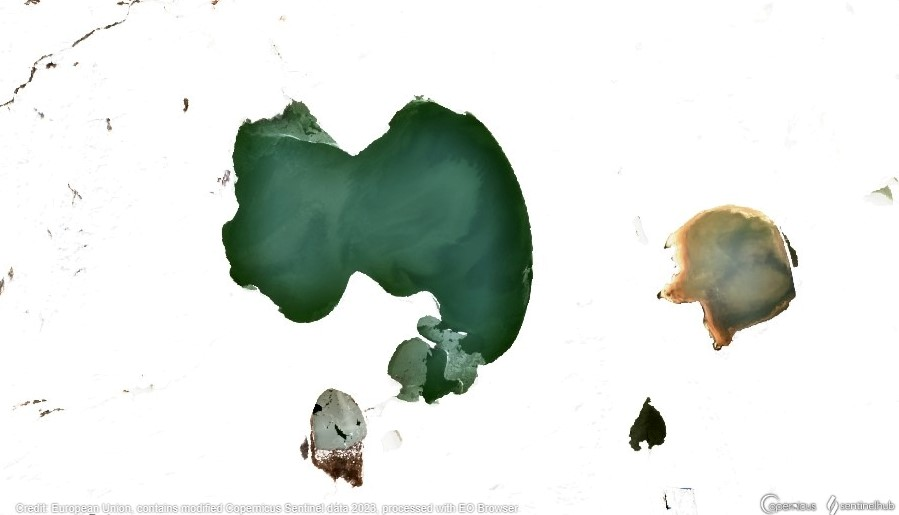
Sentinel-2 image of the lakes in November.

== See also ==
- List of lakes of Kazakhstan
