= Demidov (disambiguation) =

Demidov is a Russian noble family.

Demidov may also refer to:

- Demidov (surname) or Demidova, a surname
- Demidov, Smolensk Oblast, a town and the administrative center of Demidovsky District of Smolensk Oblast, Russia
  - Demidov (inhabited locality), a list of inhabited localities named Demidov
- Demidov Bridge, a bridge in St. Petersburg, Russia
- Demidov Island, an island in Antarctica

== See also ==
- Demidov Prize, a national scientific prize in the Russian Empire
