= Verkhny Balykley =

Verkhny Balykley Верхний Балыклей
- Selo
- Location within Volgograd Oblast Location within Russia
- Coordinates: 49°32′N 45°10′E
- Country: Russia
- Region: Volgograd Oblast
- District: Bykovsky District
- Time zone: UTC+4:00

Verkhny Balykley (Russian: Верхний Балыклей) is a rural locality (a selo) and the administrative center of Verkhnebalykleyskoye Rural Settlement, Bykovsky District, Volgograd Oblast, Russia. The population was 1,730 as of 2010. There are 22 streets.

== Geography ==
Verkhny Balykley is located in Zavolzhye, 35 km south of Bykovo (the district's administrative centre) by road. Nizhny Balykley is the nearest rural locality.
