= Krasnye Zori =

Krasnye Zori Красные Зори
- Settlement
- Location within Volgograd Oblast Location within Russia
- Coordinates: 49°44′N 45°35′E
- Country: Russia
- Region: Volgograd Oblast
- District: Bykovsky District
- Time zone: UTC+4:00

Krasnye Zori (Russian: Красные Зори) is a rural locality (a settlement) in Alexandrovskoye Rural Settlement, Bykovsky District, Volgograd Oblast, Russia. The population was 106 as of 2010. There are 2 streets.

== Geography ==
Krasnye Zori is located 15 km east of Bykovo (the district's administrative centre) by road. Razdolye is the nearest rural locality.
