= Lugovaya Proleyka =

Lugovaya Proleyka Луговая Пролейка
- Selo
- Location within Volgograd Oblast Location within Russia
- Coordinates: 49°21′N 45°04′E
- Country: Russia
- Region: Volgograd Oblast
- District: Bykovsky District
- Time zone: UTC+4:00

Lugovaya Proleyka (Russian: Луговая Пролейка) is a rural locality (a selo) and the administrative center of Lugovoproleyskoye Rural Settlement, Bykovsky District, Volgograd Oblast, Russia. The population was 1,004 as of 2010. There are 13 streets.

== Geography ==
Lugovaya Proleyka is located in Zavolzhye, on the left bank of the Volga River, 57 km south of Bykovo (the district's administrative centre) by road. Gornaya Proleyka is the nearest rural locality.
