= Zelyony, Bykovsky District, Volgograd Oblast =

Zelyony Зелёный
- Settlement
- Location within Volgograd Oblast Location within Russia
- Coordinates: 49°36′N 45°20′E
- Country: Russia
- Region: Volgograd Oblast
- District: Bykovsky District
- Time zone: UTC+4:00

Zelyony (Russian: Зелёный) is a rural locality (a settlement) and the administrative center of Zelyonovskoye Rural Settlement, Bykovsky District, Volgograd Oblast, Russia. The population was 609 as of 2010. There are 10 streets.

== Geography ==
Zelyony is located on the left bank of the Volgograd Reservoir, 21 km south of Bykovo (the district's administrative centre) by road. Molodyozhny is the nearest rural locality.
