= Batpakty (Karaganda Region) =

Coordinates: 50°27′42″N 72°41′29″E

Batpakty Батпақты
- Village
- Batpaqty
- Interactive map of Batpakty
- Country: Kazakhstan
- Region: Karaganda Region
- District: Sarybel District

Population (2009)
  - Total: 1,000
- Postal code: 101003
- Area code: +7 72149

Batpakty (Kazakh: Батпақты) is a village in the Sarybel District of the Karaganda Region of Kazakhstan. It is the administrative center of the Batpakty Rural District. The CATO code is 355633100.

== Geography ==
It is located approximately 14 km southeast of the district center, the village of Osakarovka. The M-36 highway passes through the village.

== Population ==
In 1999, the village population was 1,399 people (691 men and 708 women). According to the 2009 census, the village had a population of 1,000 people (479 men and 521 women).

== History ==
The village was founded in 1905 by German settlers from the Volga Region under the name Kronidovskoye.
