= Sadovoye, Volgograd Oblast =

Sadovoye Садовое
- Selo
- Location within Volgograd Oblast Location within Russia
- Coordinates: 49°40′N 45°55′E
- Country: Russia
- Region: Volgograd Oblast
- District: Bykovsky District
- Time zone: UTC+4:00

Sadovoye (Russian: Садовое) is a rural locality (a selo) and the administrative center of Sadovskoye Rural Settlement, Bykovsky District, Volgograd Oblast, Russia. The population was 466 as of 2010. There are 8 streets.

== Geography ==
Sadovoye is located in Zavolzhye, 44 km east of Bykovo (the district's administrative centre) by road. Krasnoselets is the nearest rural locality.
