= Molodyozhny =

Molodyozhny (masculine), Molodyozhnaya (feminine), or Molodyozhnoye (neuter) may refer to:

- Molodyozhny (inhabited locality) (Molodyozhnaya, Molodyozhnoye), name of several inhabited localities in Russia
- Molodyozhnaya (Minsk Metro), a station of the Minsk Metro, Minsk, Belarus
- Molodyozhnaya (Moscow Metro), a station of the Moscow Metro, Moscow, Russia
- Molodyozhnaya Station (Antarctica), a former Soviet research station in Antarctica
- Molodezhny (Karaganda Region), Kazakhstan
