= Molodezhny, Karaganda Region =

Molodezhny Молодежный
- Location in Kazakhstan
- Coordinates: 50°43′18″N 73°31′48″E
- Country: Kazakhstan
- Region: Karaganda Region
- District: Osakarov District
- Settled: 1962

Population (2009)
  - Total: 6,139
- Time zone: UTC+6
- Postcode: 101012

Molodezhny (Kazakh: Молодежный; Russian: Молодёжный) is a village in the Karaganda Region, Kazakhstan. It is part of the Molodezhny rural district (KATO code - 355657100). Molodezhny was established in 1962 during the construction of the Irtysh–Karaganda Canal. There is a coal mine in the town. Population: 6,139 (2009 census results); 6,817 (1999 census results).

== Geography ==
Molodezhny is located by the western bank of the Irtysh–Karaganda Canal. Shybyndy lake lies 15 kilometers (9.3 mi) to the SSE of the town and Osakarovka, the district center, 70 kilometers (43 mi) to the WSW. The Karaganda — Pavlodar highway passes through Molodezhny.
