= Cryptospora =

Cryptospora may refer to:

- Cryptospora (plant), a genus of flowering plants in the family Brassicaceae
- Cryptospora (fungus), a genus of fungi in the family Gnomoniaceae
