= Zavolzhsky, Bykovsky District, Volgograd Oblast =

Zavolzhsky Заволжский
- Settlement
- Location within Volgograd Oblast Location within Russia
- Coordinates: 49°54′N 45°28′E
- Country: Russia
- Region: Volgograd Oblast
- District: Bykovsky District
- Time zone: UTC+4:00

Zavolzhsky (Russian: Заволжский) is a rural locality (a settlement) in Kislovskoye Rural Settlement, Bykovsky District, Volgograd Oblast, Russia. The population was 98 as of 2010.

== Geography ==
Zavolzhsky is located in Zavolzhye, 19 km north of Bykovo (the district's administrative centre) by road. Peschany is the nearest rural locality.
