= Oshagandy (Karaganda Region) =

Oshagandy Ошағанды
- Selo
- Oşağandy
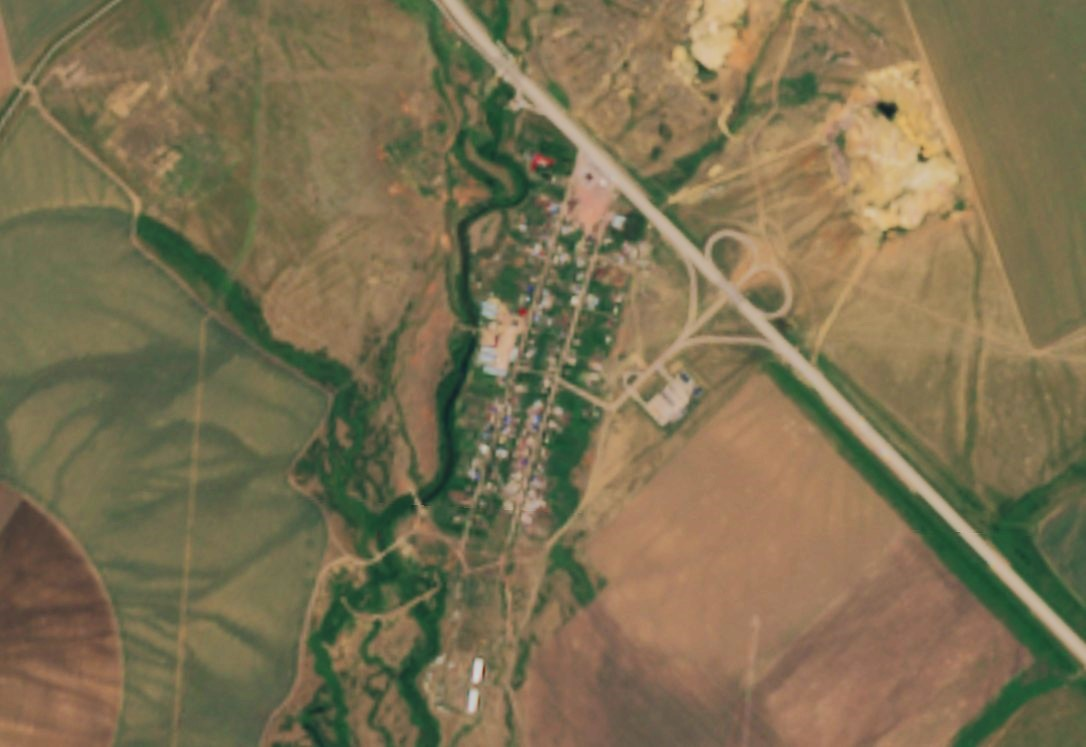
- A satellite image of the selo (Sentinel-2 L1C data, modified)

- Location in Kazakhstan
- Coordinates: 50°18′45″N 72°43′57″E
- Country: Kazakhstan
- Region: Karaganda Region
- District: Sarybel District

Population (2009)
  - Total: 394
- Area code: +7 72149

Oshagandy (Kazakh: Ошағанды) is a selo in the Sarybel District of the Karaganda Region in Kazakhstan. It is a part of the Batpakty Rural District. Code CATO - 355633300.

== Population ==
In the year 1999, the population of the selo was 493 people (232 men and 261 women). According to the 2009 census of Kazakhstan, there were 394 people (180 and 214 women).

== History ==
Founded in the year 1908 by German settlers under the name Krasny Kut (Named after Krasny Kut in Russia).
