= Molodyozhny, Volgograd Oblast =

Molodyozhny Молодёжный
- Settlement
- Location within Volgograd Oblast Location within Russia
- Coordinates: 49°37′N 45°19′E
- Country: Russia
- Region: Volgograd Oblast
- District: Bykovsky District
- Time zone: UTC+4:00

Molodyozhny (Russian: Молодёжный) is a rural locality (a settlement) in Zelyonovskoye Rural Settlement, Bykovsky District, Volgograd Oblast, Russia. The population was 117 as of 2010. There are 5 streets.

== Geography ==
Molodyozhny is located on the left bank of the Volga River, in Zavolzhye, 20 km south of Bykovo (the district's administrative centre) by road. Zelyony is the nearest rural locality.
