= Auliekol (disambiguation) =

Auliekol may refer to:

- Auliekol, a village in Kostanay Region
- Auliekol District, Kostanay Region
- Auliekol (lake), a lake in Pavlodar Region
- Auliekol, another name for Lake Burabay, Akmola Region
