= Pavel Demidov =

Pavel Demidov may refer to:

- Pavel Nikolaievich Demidov (1798–1840), Russian nobleman
- Pavel Grigoryevich Demidov (1738–1828), Russian traveller and patron of scientific education
- Pavel Pavlovich Demidov, 2nd Prince of San Donato (1839–1885), Russian industrialist, jurist, philanthropist and nobleman
- Pavel Evgenjevič Demidov (1971–2020), Russian caver and speleologist
