= Buiratau National Park =

National park in Kazakhstan

Buiratau State National Nature Park
- «Бұйратау» мемлекеттік ұлттық табиғи паркі (Kazakh); Государственный национальный природный парк «Буйратау» (Russian)
- IUCN category II (national park)
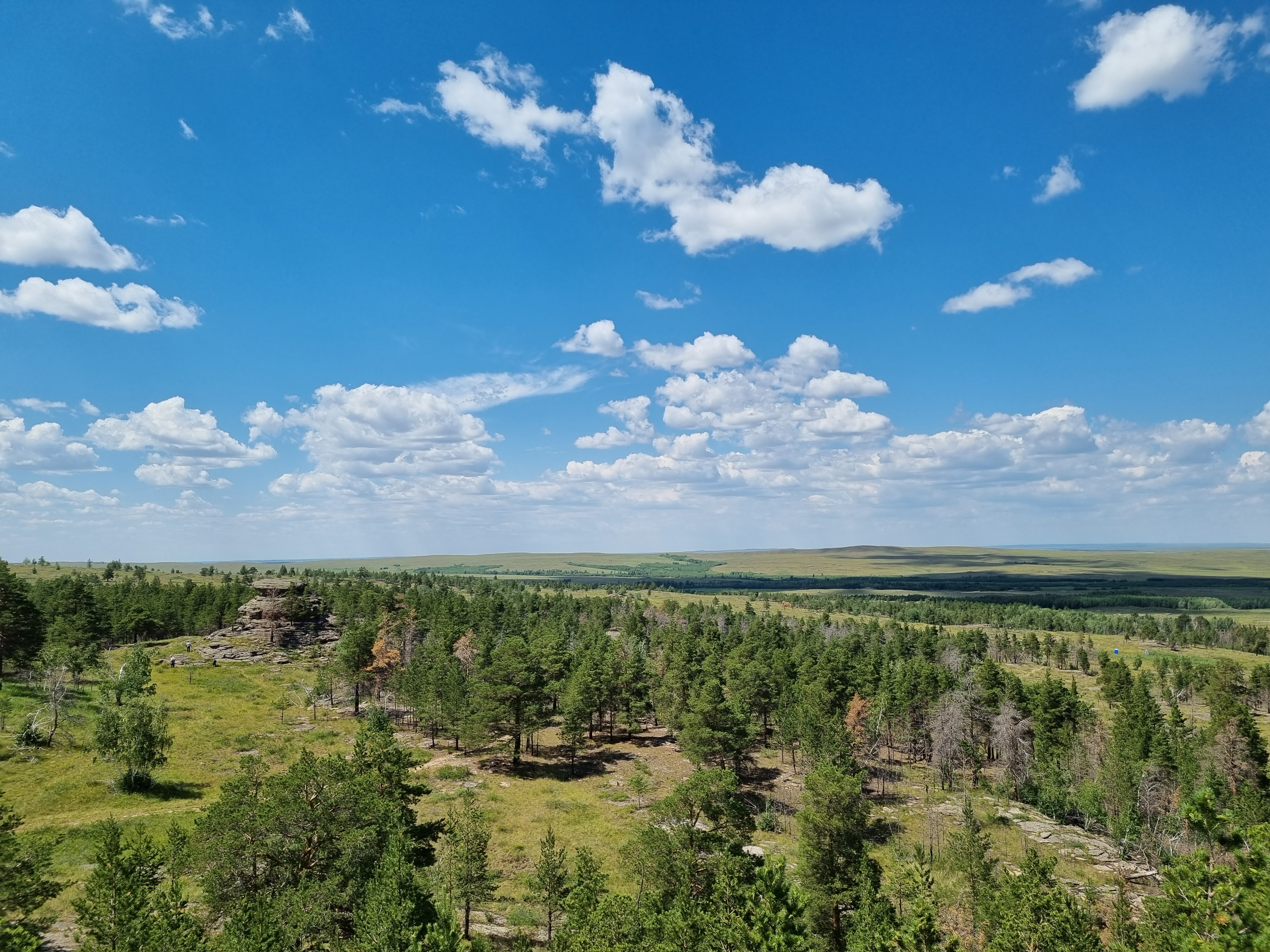

- Location within Kazakhstan
- Location: Yereymentau Mountains; Akmola Region, Karaganda Region
- Nearest city: Astana
- Coordinates: 51°20′N 73°20′E
- Area: 88,968 hectares (219,845 acres; 890 km^{2}; 344 sq mi)
- Established: 11 March 2011; 15 years ago
- Governing body: Committee of Forestry and Fauna of the Ministry of Agriculture, Kazakhstan
- Website: http://gnpp-buiratau.kz/en

The Buiratau State National Nature Park (Kazakh: «Бұйратау» мемлекеттік ұлттық табиғи паркі, romanized: «Būiratau» memlekettık ūlttyq tabiği parkı; Kazakh: Государственный национальный природный парк «Буйратау», romanized: Gosudarstvennyy natsional'nyy prirodnyy park «Buyratau») is a national park in Kazakhstan that was created in 2011 to preserve a unique transitional zone between dry steppe and semi-arid forest ecosystems of the Kazakh Uplands of central Kazakhstan. The park is located in the Yereymentau Mountains, straddling the border of Yereymentau District of Akmola Region (60,815 hectares (150,277 acres; 608 km^{2}; 235 sq mi)), and Sarybel District of Karaganda Region (28,154 hectares (69,570 acres; 282 km^{2}; 109 sq mi)), and is about 60 km east of the capital city of Astana.

== Topography ==
The area is dry steppe in the north, with more forest in the hills to the south and stands of alder and birch along the streams. The relief is low ridges and hills of the Yereymentau Mountains, with inter-mountain plains. There are many closed basins with very shallow (less than 1 meter) salt lakes; fresh groundwater can be found at depths of 1 – 17 meters. The largest lakes are Bozaigyr (Бозайгыр) and Azhybai (Ажыбай).

The park was formed by combining the original core reserve with the former Belodymov Zoological Park and the former Yereymentau Nature Reserve.

== Climate ==
The climate is "Cold Semi-Arid Climate" (Köppen Classification BSk: warm, dry summers with cold winters. 280 mm of precipitation per year (maximum in summer). Average temperature ranges from −16 °C (3 °F) in January to 20 °C (68 °F) in July.

== Plants and animals ==
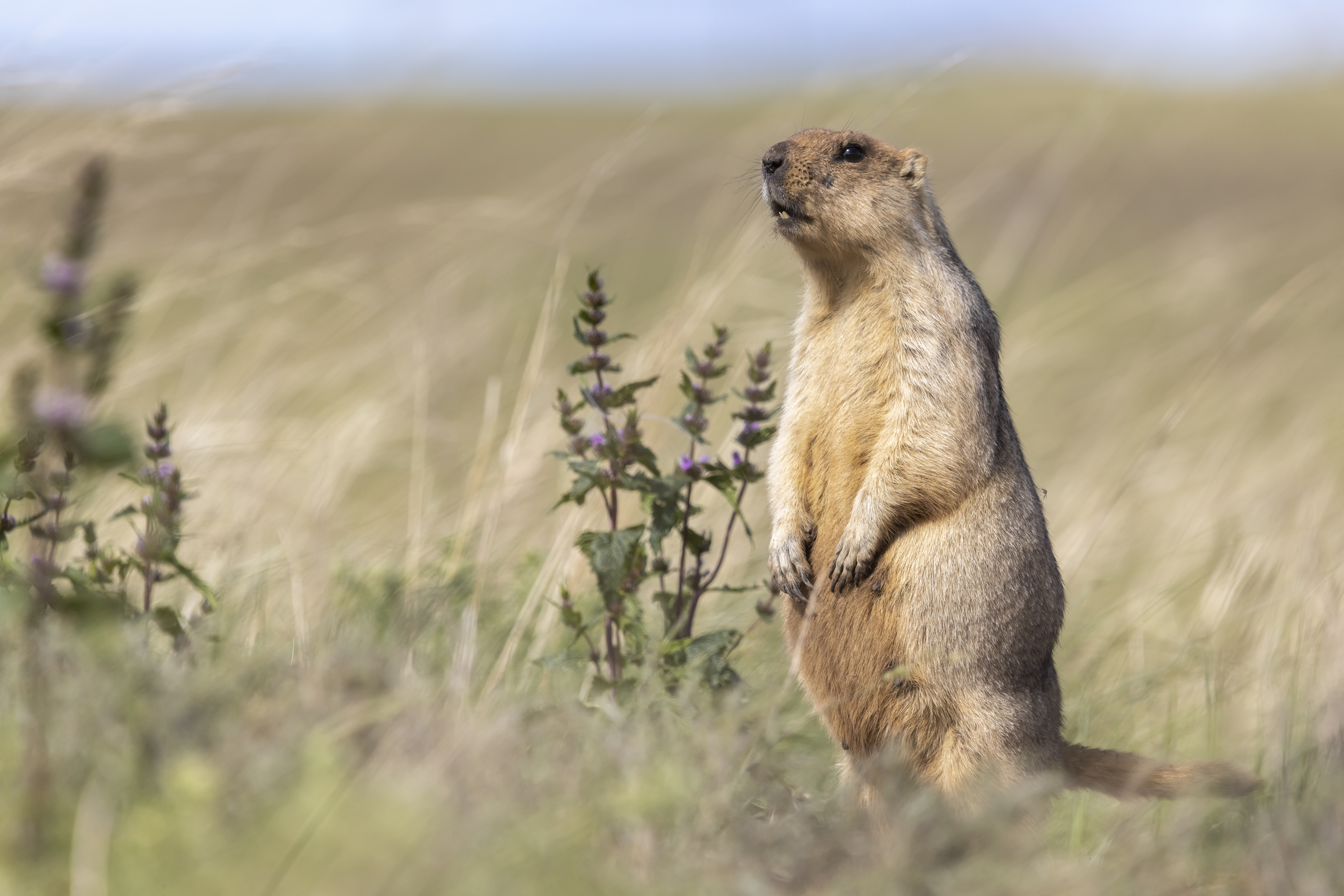
A bobak marmot in the park.

In addition to the relic forests, common plants of the area include scrub Siberian pea-tree (Caragana arborescens) and feather grass (Stipa). Scientists have recorded over 450 species of vascular plants in the park, representing 20% of the species of the Central Kazakh Uplands.

The area is also known for Yereimantau Wild Sheep, supporting approximately 200 individuals. 45 species of mammals have been recorded in the area, and 227 species of birds.

== Tourism ==
There are four tourist routes in the park; individual and group tours are offered in the summer. A small admission fee is charged at the entrance.
