= Demidov (surname) =

Demidov (Russian: Демидов) or Demidova (feminine; Демидова) is a Russian surname. Notable people with the surname include:

- The Demidovs, a family of Russian entrepreneurs in the 18th–19th centuries, including:
  - Elim Demidov, 3rd prince of San Donato
- Alla Demidova (born 1936), Soviet/Russian actress
- Anna Demidova (1878–1918), Russian chambermaid
- Anna Demidova (dancer) (born 1988), Russian-American dancer, actress and model
- Georgy Demidov (1908–1987), Russian writer and political prisoner
- Igor Demidov (1873–1946), Russian politician
- Ivan Demidov (poker player) (born 1981), Russian poker player
- Ivan Demidov (born 2005), Russian ice hockey player
- Nikolay Ivanovich Demidov (1773–1833), Russian general and politician
- Pavel Evgenjevič Demidov (1971–2020), Russian caver and speleologist
- Vadim Demidov (born 1986), Norwegian footballer
- Vladimir Demidov (born 1964), Soviet and Russian footballer

== Fictional characters ==
- Leo Demidov, the main protagonist in the novel Child 44 by British writer Tom Rob Smith
