= Mambet Shotbayev =

- Шотбаев Мәмбет Шотбайұлы
- Born: 1892; Pavlodar uyezd
- Died: 1978 (aged 85–86); Yereymentau District, Akmola Region
- Citizenship: Russian Empire → Alash autonomy → USSR
- Years active: 1923—1978
- Known for: Deputy of Yereymentau district in 1953
- Political party: AUCP
- Spouse: Shotbayeva (Shashkina) Umsyngan
- Children: 14
- Father: Shotbay
- Awards: |

Mambet Shotbayev (kaz.Мәмбет Шотбайұлы Шотбаев; 1892 – 1978) was a politician, deputy, and Hero of Socialist Labour.

== Biography ==
Mambet Shotbayev belonged to the Kozgan clan. He was born in 1892 in the Pavlodar Uyezd (present-day Bayanaul District). During the severe famine of 1932, he led an agricultural brigade and made a significant contribution to improving the living conditions of the local population. In 1953, he served as a deputy of the Soviet from Yereymentau District. He also worked as the head of the Yereymentau horse farm. He died in 1978 in Akmola Region, Yereymentau District.

== Family ==
- Wife — Umsyngan Zhunisbekkyzy (1900–1976), elder sister of poet Zein Shashkin;
- They had 14 children;
- Father in law of Edil Ergozhin;
- Older brother — Teubek, father of Kairzhan Shotbayev.

== Awards ==
- Hero of Socialist Labour;
- Order of Lenin.
