= Demidov, Volgograd Oblast =

Demidov Демидов
- Khutor
- Location within Volgograd Oblast Location within Russia
- Coordinates: 49°13′N 45°21′E
- Country: Russia
- Region: Volgograd Oblast
- District: Bykovsky District
- Time zone: UTC+4:00

Demidov (Russian: Демидов) is a rural locality (a selo) and the administrative center of Demidovskoye Rural Settlement, Bykovsky District, Volgograd Oblast, Russia. The population was 599 as of 2010. There are 14 streets.

== Geography ==
Demidov is located 87 km south of Bykovo (the district's administrative centre) by road. Stolyarov is the nearest rural locality.
