= Zavolzhsky =

Zavolzhsky (masculine), Zavolzhskaya (feminine), or Zavolzhskoye (neuter) may refer to:

- Zavolzhsky District, several districts and city districts in Russia
- Zavolzhskoye Urban Settlement, a municipal formation which the town of Zavolzhsk in Zavolzhsky District of Ivanovo Oblast, Russia is incorporated as
- Zavolzhsky (rural locality) (Zavolzhskaya, Zavolzhskoye), several rural localities in Russia
