= Demidov (inhabited locality) =

Demidov (Russian: Деми́дов) is the name of several inhabited localities in Russia.

Urban localities

- Demidov, Smolensk Oblast, a town under the administrative jurisdiction of Demidovskoye Urban Settlement in Demidovsky District of Smolensk Oblast

Rural localities

- Demidov, Volgograd Oblast, a khutor in Demidovsky Selsoviet of Bykovsky District of Volgograd Oblast
