= Veryovkina Cave =

Cave in Abkhazia, Georgia

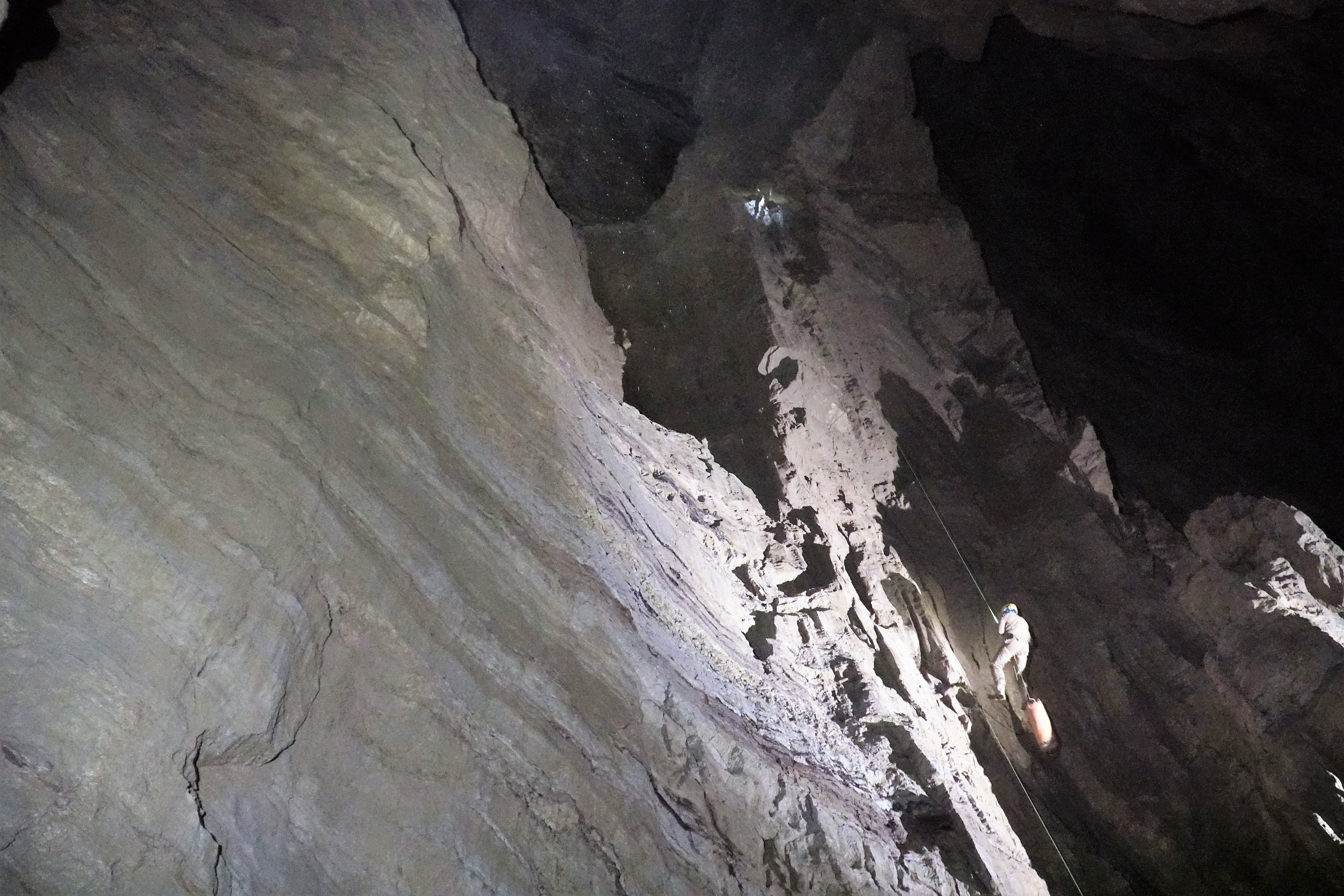
- 155 m [508 ft] deep Babatunda pit at −400 m [1312 ft], the largest shaft in the cave
- Interactive map of Veryovkina Cave
- Location: Abkhazia, Georgia
- Coordinates: 43°24′56″N 40°21′23″E
- Depth: 2,209 meters (7,247 ft)
- Length: 17,500 meters (57,400 ft)
- Discovery: 1968
- Geology: Limestone

Veryovkina Cave (also spelled Verëvkina Cave, Georgian: ვერიოვკინის მღვიმე, romanized: veriovk'inis mghvime; Abkhaz: Вериовкин иҳаԥы) is a cave in Abkhazia, Georgia. With a known depth of 2,209 meters (7,247 ft) as of 2025, it is the second deepest-known cave on Earth after Krubera Cave. Veryovkina is in the Arabika Massif, in the Gagra mountain range of the Western Caucasus, on the pass between the Krepost and Zont mountains, close to the slopes of Mount Krepost. Its entrance is 2,285 meters (7,497 ft) above sea level. The entrance of the cave has a cross section of 3 m × 4 m (9.8 ft × 13.1 ft), and the depth of the entrance shaft is 32 m (105 ft). The confirmed depth of the cave is 2,209 m (7,247 ft) (including 26 m (85 ft) in the lower siphon). Veryovkina is one of the two known caves deeper than 2,000 metres, the other being Krubera Cave in the same mountain range.

== Naming ==
In 1968, the cave was assigned the name S-115, which was later replaced by P1-7, and in 1986 it was renamed after caver and cave diver Aleksandr Veryovkin. Veryovkin died in 1983 while exploring a siphon in the cave Su-Akan, located in the Sary-Tala massif, now Kabardino-Balkaria, Russia.

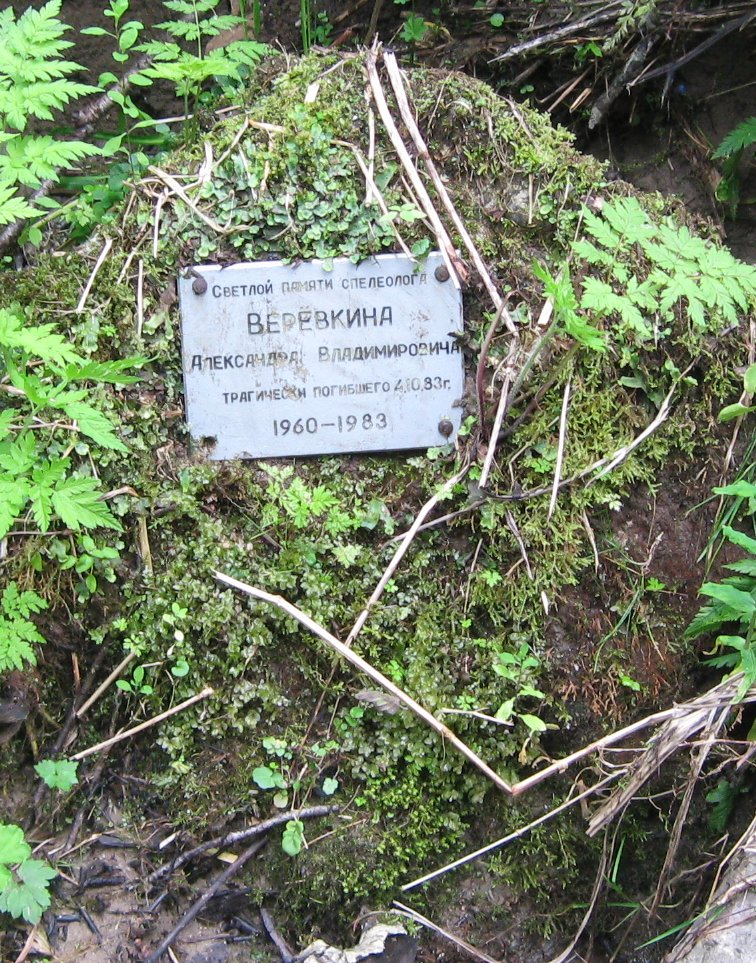
Memorial plaque at the Suu-Akan cave where Alexander Veryovkin died in 1983

== History ==
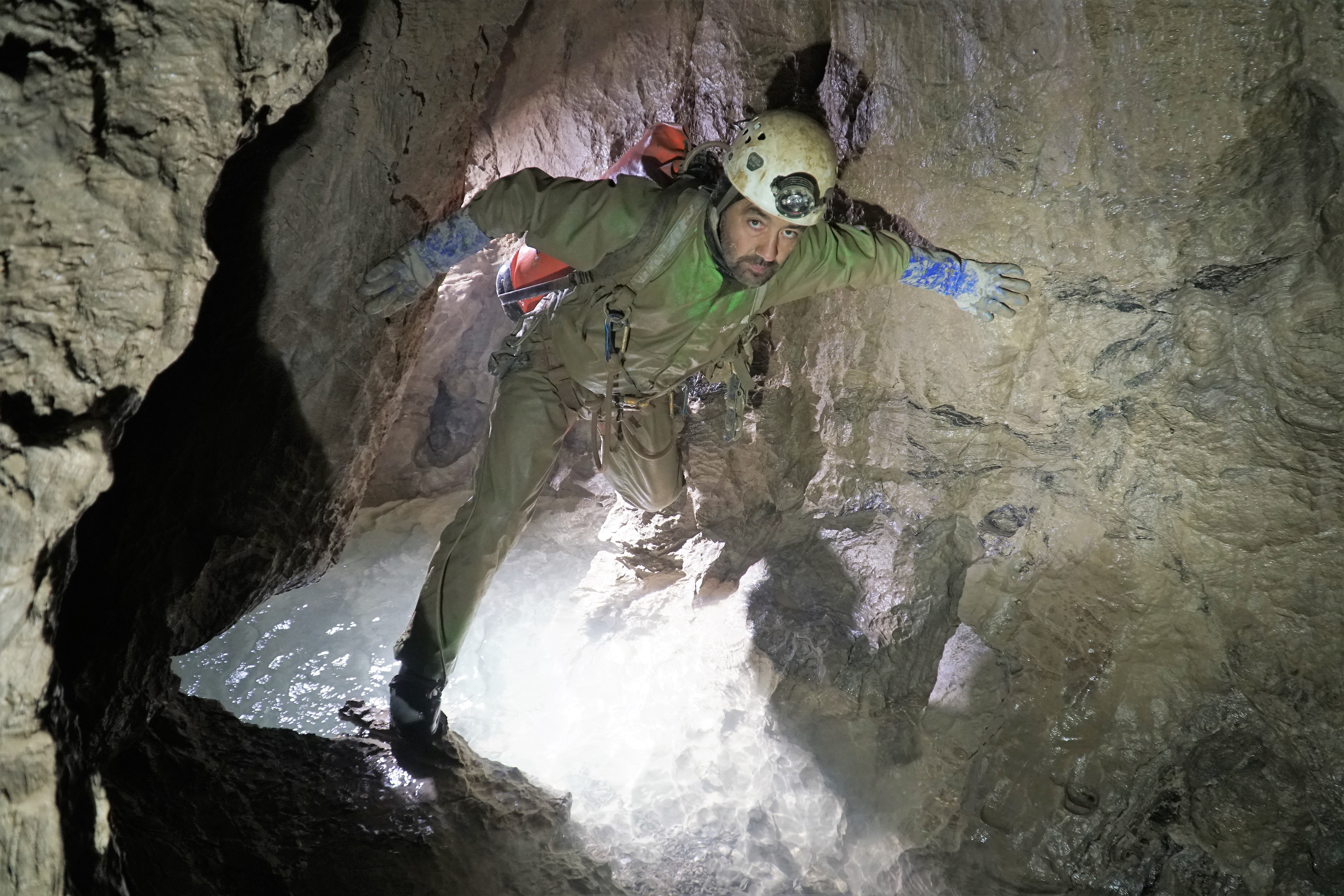
Member of the Perovo-Speleo team passing the flooded passage at the depth of −1,400 m (−4,600 ft), in 2018

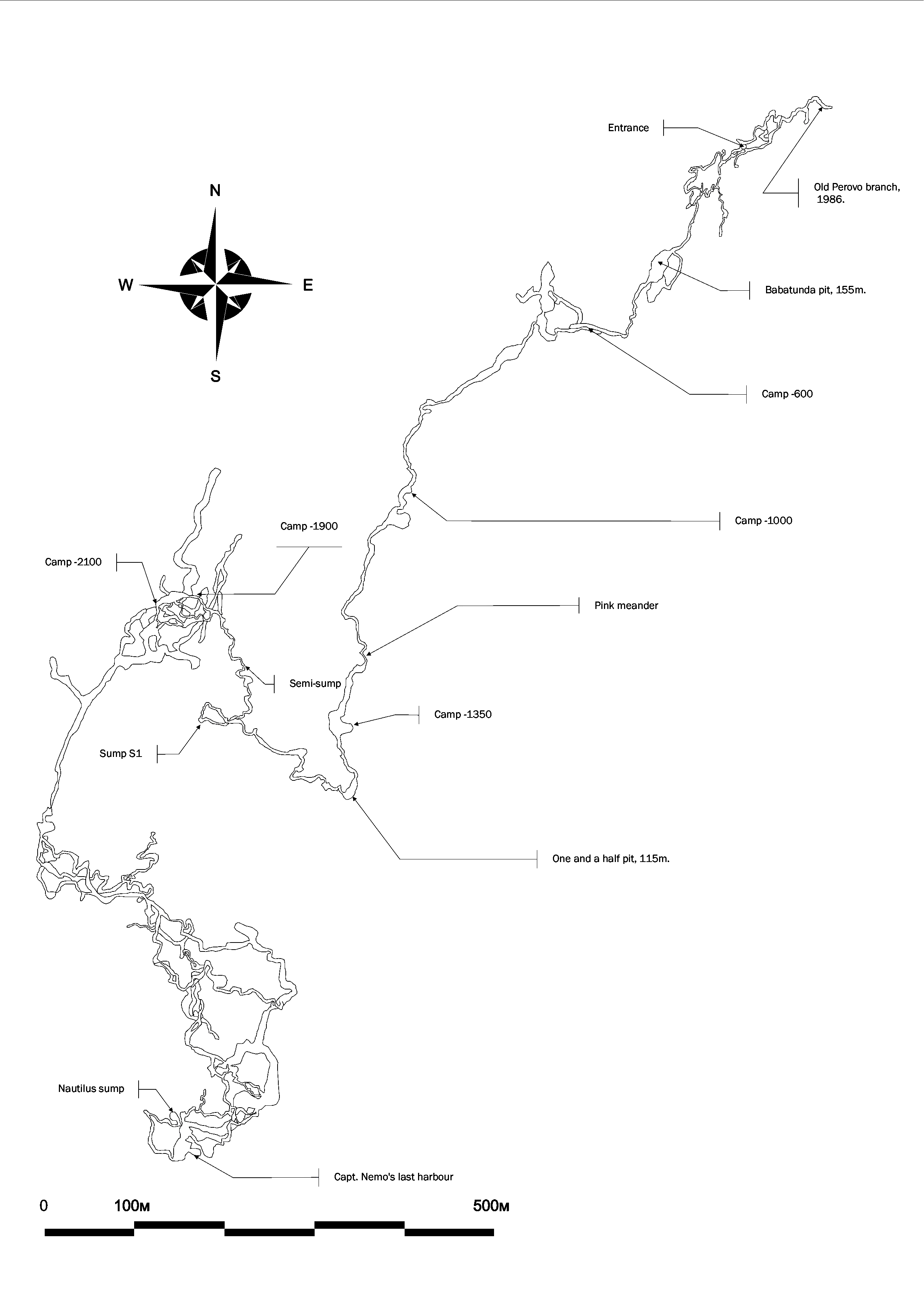
Two profiles of the cave
- 1968: the cave was discovered by cavers from Krasnoyarsk. They reached a depth of 115 m (377 ft) and marked it on the map as S-115.
- 1982: the cave was discovered for the second time by the expedition of the "Perovo" speleoclub (PSC) from Moscow. It was marked as P1-7.
- 1983–1986: cavers from the same team continued exploration and reached the depth of 440 m (1,440 ft).
- 1986–2000: work in the cave did not take place.
- From 2000 to 2015 – the PSC and its "Perovo-speleo" team (PST) researched the cave bottom. Despite the effort, the deepest known cave depth remained at 440 m (1,440 ft).
- August 2015 – cavers from the PSC discovered a new shaft, but could not explore it because they did not have rope. This discovery opened the way to a series of later discoveries.
- June 2016 – the expedition of the PST took place. The team started from the same point. They surveyed a pit that was about 30 m deep and a small system of passages below. The next day Evgenyj Kuzmin climbed over the wall of boulders and found the head of the Babatunda pit. Its depth was later determined to be 156 m (512 ft). That expedition managed to reach a depth of 630 m (2,070 ft).
- August 2016 – a joint expedition of the PST and the PSC reached a depth of 1,010 m (3,310 ft).
- October 2016 – the expedition of the PST reached a depth of 1,350 m (4,430 ft).
- February 2017 – the expedition of the PST reached a depth of 1,832 m (6,010 ft). The cave advanced to the second deepest in the world, after Krubera (Voronya) cave.
- Early August 2017 – the PSC explored the cave to a depth of 2,151 m (7,057 ft). An ancient collector of the karst aquifer system with extensive horizontal tunnels, not typical for the Arabika Massif, was discovered. Veryovkina became the second super deep cave (over 2 km (1.2 mi)) and the deepest accessible without diving equipment.
- Late August 2017 – the PST reached a depth of 2,204 m (7,231 ft), thus setting a new world depth record. A huge system of more than 6,000 m (20,000 ft) of subhorizontal passages below −2,100 m (−6,900 ft) was discovered and surveyed.
- March 2018 – another expedition by the same team added more than a kilometer of tunnels to the cave map. They also measured the depth of the Captain Nemo’s Last Stand terminal siphon at 8.5 m (28 ft), increasing the total cave depth reached to 2,212 m (7,257 ft).
- September 2018 – a photo trip of the PST to the bottom of the cave took place, led by Pavel Demidov, with the English cave photographer Robbie Shone. The team narrowly escaped the flood caused by a rain storm, which filled the lower level of the cave.
- August 2019 – the cave depth was increased to 2,212 meters (7,257 ft) during the survey by members of the PSC.
- August 2022 - tracing of underground water flows to known surface lakes, precision measurement of entrance
- August 2023 – the cave depth was increased to 2,223 meters (7,293 ft) through a survey of the Captain Nemo's Last Stand siphon by an underwater drone, again during an expedition of the PSC.
- August 2024 – during another expedition of the PSC the cave depth was decreased to 2,209 meters (7,247 ft). The previously established connection between the stream at the bottom of the cave and the Blue Lake (Голубое озеро (Абхазия)) on the surface enabled the precise measurement of the cave depth by taking into account the difference in heights between the entrance and the bottom siphon using a high-precision GNSS receiver EFT M3.

During an expedition in 2021, PST found the body of a caver, who died exploring on his own, at −1,100 meters (−3,600 ft). He was later identified as Sergei Kozeev, who left his home in Sochi (Russia) on 1 November 2020 and began descent into Veryovkina, where he spent around a week at a −600 meters (−2,000 ft) permanent camp. Then he continued his descent down to technically challenging parts at −1,100 meters (−3,600 ft) where he got stuck, and died of hypothermia. He did not bring stirrups necessary to climb out of the lower, perpetually wet, regions of the cave. The body was eventually recovered after a complex retrieval operation on 17 August 2021.

== See also ==
- List of caves
- List of deepest caves
- Speleology
