= Shybyndy =

Lake in Kazakhstan

- Шыбынды
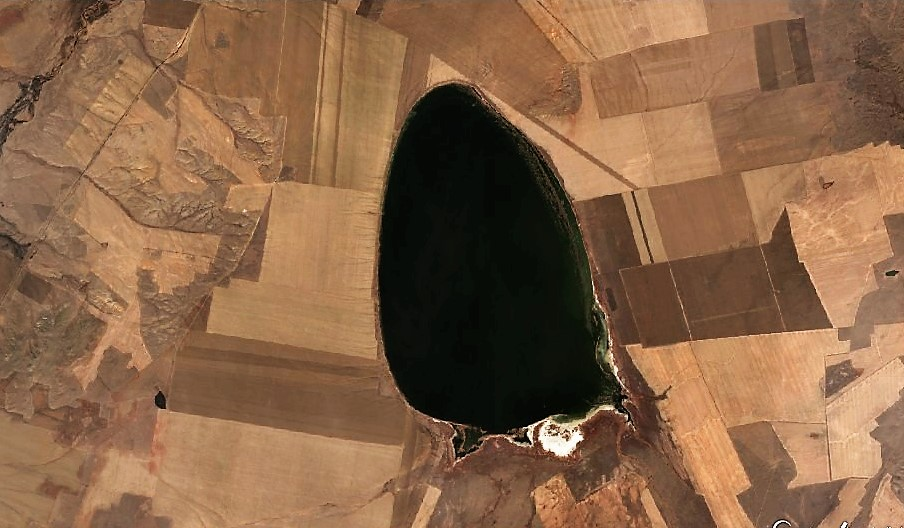
- Sentinel-2 image of the lake

- Location within Kazakhstan
- Location: Kazakh Uplands
- Coordinates: 50°34′N 73°41′E
- Type: endorheic
- Catchment area: 617 square kilometers (238 sq mi)
- Basin countries: Kazakhstan
- Max. length: 8.6 kilometers (5.3 mi)
- Max. width: 5.3 kilometers (3.3 mi)
- Surface area: 36 square kilometers (14 sq mi)
- Residence time: UTC+6
- Surface elevation: 473 meters (1,552 ft)

Shybyndy (Kazakh: Шыбынды; Russian: Шыбынды), is a salt lake in Sarybel District, Karaganda Region, Kazakhstan.

The lake is located 15 kilometers (9.3 mi) to the SSE of Molodezhny town. The nearest inhabited pace is Shiderti village, 5 kilometers (3.1 mi) to the NNW of the northern tip of the lake.

== Geography ==
Shybyndy is an endorheic lake in the central Kazakh Uplands, 10 kilometers (6.2 mi) to the east of the Irtysh–Karaganda Canal. It lies in a basin surrounded by smooth hills. Its shape is ovoid and its shores are even, with no indentations. There are no islands on the lake

A small intermittent river flows into Shybyndy from the southeast. There is agricultural land near the lake, mainly on the western side.

== Flora and fauna ==
Reeds and sedges grow by the shoreline. Many birds, mostly waterfowl, are found in the lake during their breeding season.

== See also ==
- List of lakes of Kazakhstan
