= Zavolzhsky District =

Zavolzhsky District is the name of several administrative and municipal districts in Russia. The name literally means "Transvolgan".

== Districts of the federal subjects ==
Location of Ivanovo Oblast in Russia

- Zavolzhsky District, Ivanovo Oblast, an administrative and municipal district of Ivanovo Oblast

== City divisions ==
- Zavolzhsky City District, Kostroma, a city district of Kostroma, the administrative center of Kostroma Oblast
- Zavolzhsky City District, Tver, a city district of Tver, the administrative center of Tver Oblast
- Zavolzhsky City District, Ulyanovsk, a city district of Ulyanovsk, the administrative center of Ulyanovsk Oblast
- Zavolzhsky City District, Yaroslavl, a city district of Yaroslavl, the administrative center of Yaroslavl Oblast
Cities in Russia with a city division called "Zavolzhsky"

== See also ==
- Zavolzhsky (disambiguation)
- Zavolzhsk
