= Sarma Cave =

Karst cave in the Georgia

- Location within Abkhazia Location within Georgia
- Location: Abkhazia, (Note: The political status of Abkhazia is disputed. Having unilaterally declared independence from Georgia in 1992, Abkhazia is formally recognised as an independent state by 5 UN member states (two other states previously recognised it but then withdrew their recognition), while the remainder of the international community recognizes it as de jure Georgian territory. Georgia continues to claim the area as its own territory, designating it as Russian-occupied territory.) Georgia
- Coordinates: 43°23′38.3″N 40°22′21.0″E
- Depth: 1,830 m (6,000 ft)
- Geology: Limestone

Sarma Cave (Georgian: სარმის მღვიმე), located in the Gagra District of Abkhazia, a breakaway region of Georgia, is the third-deepest recorded cave in the world. Its depth (1830 m) was measured in 2012 by a team led by Pavel Rudko.

The cave was discovered in 1990 by caver Sergey Shipitsin during a research expedition of the Arabika caving club from Irkutsk, led by Alexander Osintsev.

== Fauna ==
Two species of stygobiont amphipods have been found: Zenkevitchia sandroruffoi, living at depths of no more than -350 m and found in other caves of eastern Arabika Massif, in Troika Cave (at -30 m) and in Eagle's Nest Cave (-75 m); and Adaugammarus pilosus, inhabiting aquatic biotopes in the deep part of the cave (elevations -1270 m and -1700 m).

== See also ==
- List of caves
- Speleology
- List of deepest caves
