= Auliekol (lake) =

Lake in Kazakhstan

- Әулиекөл
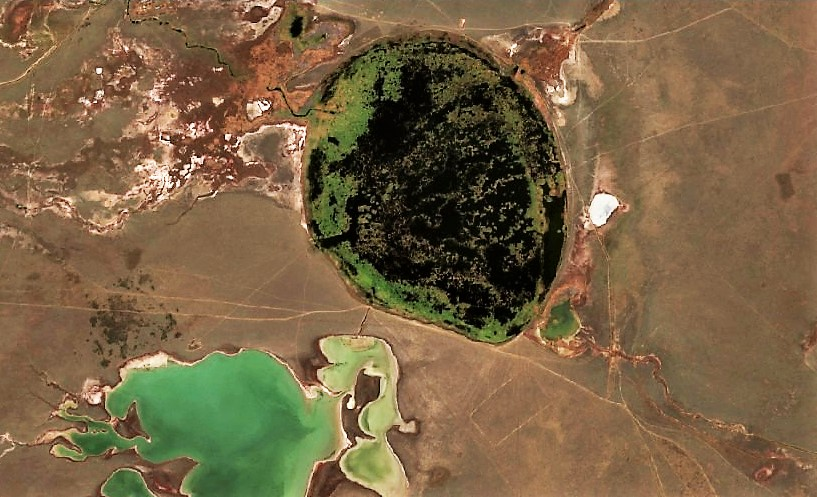
- Sentinel-2 picture of the lake in October

- Location within Kazakhstan
- Location: Ekibastuz City Administration
- Coordinates: 52°11′01″N 74°45′58″E
- Type: endorheic lake
- Primary inflows: Olenti
- Basin countries: Kazakhstan
- Max. length: 3.7 kilometers (2.3 mi)
- Max. width: 2.9 kilometers (1.8 mi)
- Surface area: 7.5 square kilometers (2.9 sq mi)
- Residence time: UTC+6:00
- Shore length^{1}: 11.9 kilometers (7.4 mi)
- Surface elevation: 126 meters (413 ft)
- ^{1} Shore length is not a well-defined measure.

Auliekol (Kazakh: Әулиекөл) is a lake in the Ekibastuz City Administration, Pavlodar Region, Kazakhstan. It lies 2 kilometers (1.2 mi) to the southeast of Karazhar village, 50 kilometers (31 mi) northwest of Ekibastuz and 120 kilometers (75 mi) to the west of Pavlodar. The name "Auliekol" means holy lake in Kazakh.

Auliekol lakeshore includes one of the important archaeological sites of the region. There are the ruins of an ancient settlement with the remains of a hillfort close to the Olenti river mouth by the western shore of the lake.

== Geography ==
Auliekol is an endorheic lake belonging to the Irtysh basin. It lies near the northern end of the Kazakh Uplands at an elevation of 126 meters (413 ft). The Irtysh flows 110 kilometers (68 mi) to the east of the eastern shores of the lake.

The Olenti river flows into the western lakeshore. There are a number of smaller lakes in the vicinity of Auliekol. Issensor (Есенсор), a salt flat, lies close to the southwestern shore of Auliekol. The area surrounding the lake is mostly flat steppe used for local livestock grazing.

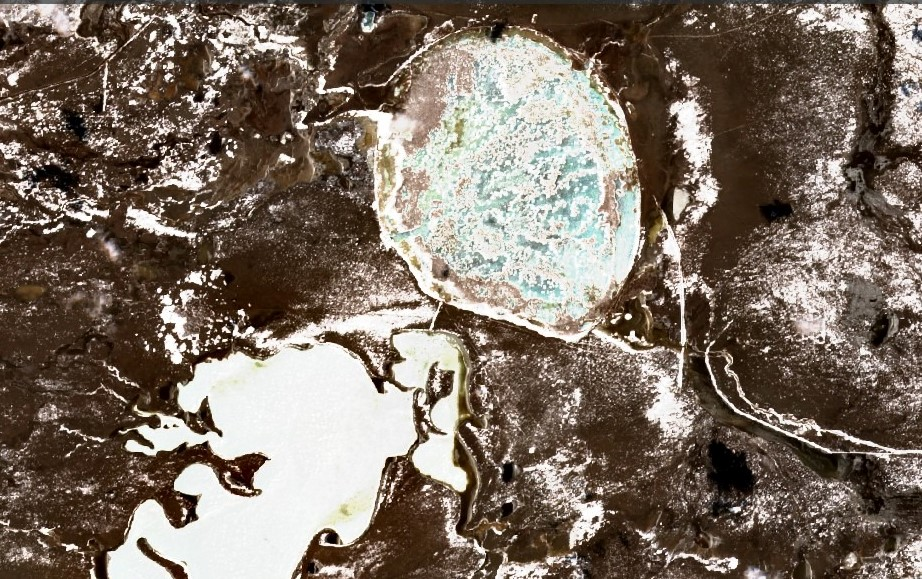
Auliekol and Issensor before the thaw.

== Flora ==
The vegetation of the lakeshore zone includes spear grass, wormwood, wiregrass, akshityr and sedges.

== See also ==
- Sor (geomorphology)
