= Demidov Island =

Island in Antarctica

- Location within Antarctica

Geography
- Location: Antarctica
- Coordinates: 67°29′S 48°21′E

Administration
- Administered under the Antarctic Treaty System

Demographics
- Population: 0 (uninhabited)

Demidov Island is a small island 9.3 kilometres (5 nmi) north of the mouth of Rayner Glacier and 17 kilometres (9 nmi) southwest of the Hydrographer Islands along the coast of Enderby Land. It appears that the island was mapped by both the Australian National Antarctic Research Expeditions and the Soviet expedition in 1957. It was named by the Soviet expedition for Lieutenant Dimitri Demidov of the Russian expedition of 1819–21 under Fabian Gottlieb von Bellingshausen.

== See also ==
- List of Antarctic and sub-Antarctic islands
