= Molodyozhny, Vozhegodsky District, Vologda Oblast =

Molodyozhny Молодёжный
- Settlement
- Location within Vologda Oblast Location within Russia
- Coordinates: 60°32′N 40°13′E
- Country: Russia
- Region: Vologda Oblast
- District: Vozhegodsky District
- Time zone: UTC+3:00

Molodyozhny (Russian: Молодёжный) is a rural locality (a settlement) in Yavengskoye Rural Settlement, Vozhegodsky District, Vologda Oblast, Russia. The population was 165 as of 2002.

== Geography ==
Molodyozhny is located 10 km north of Vozhega (the district's administrative centre) by road. Syamba is the nearest rural locality.
