= Arabika Massif =

Mountain outcrop in the Gagra Range, Abkhazia

Coordinates: 43.41°N 40.34°E

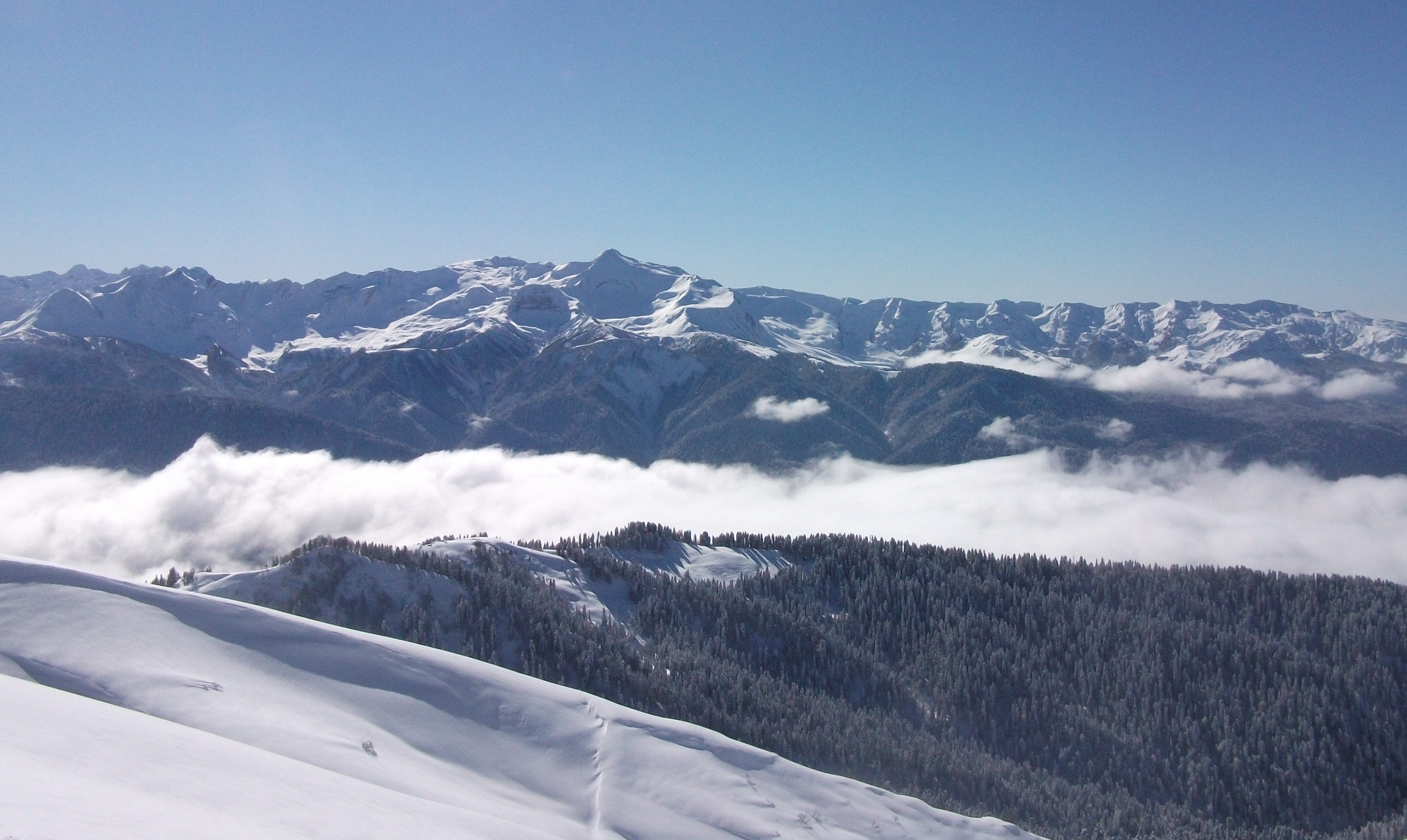
Arabika Massif from Aibga

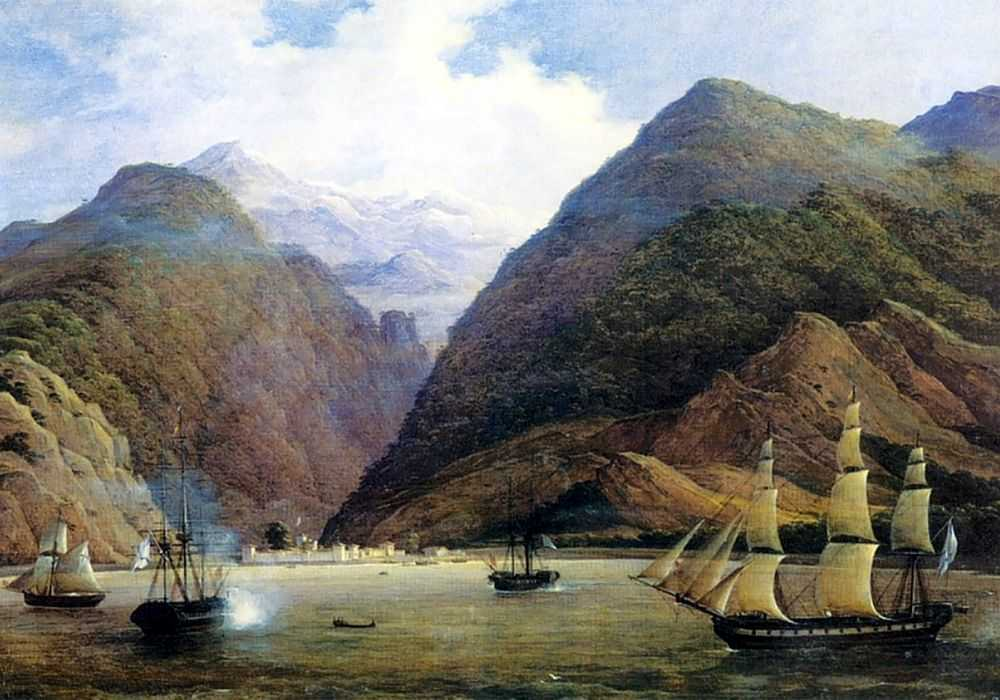
View from the Black Sea in the mid-19th century

Arabika Massif is a glacially eroded karst outcropping of the Gagra mountain range in a region controlled by the breakaway Republic of Abkhazia (Note: The political status of Abkhazia is disputed. Having unilaterally declared independence from Georgia in 1992, Abkhazia is formally recognised as an independent state by 4 UN member states (three other states previously recognised it but then withdrew their recognition), while the remainder of the international community recognizes it as de jure Georgian territory. Georgia continues to claim the area as its own territory, designating it as Russian-occupied territory.) but claimed by Georgia in the West Caucasus, by the city of Gagra. It is home to the three deepest caves in the world.

== Description ==
The massif is bounded on the northwest, north, northeast and east by the canyons of the Sandripsh, Kuturusha, Gega, and Bzyb rivers. To the west is the Psou River. It is bounded on the south by the Black Sea.

There are no "surface waters or erosion landforms," only "weakly expressed dry ravines."

The Arabika contains several hundred caves, including the three deepest-measured caves in the world: Krubera Cave (2,224 m, 7,297 ft), also known as Veronja Cave; Veryovkina Cave (2,209 m, 7,247 ft); and Sarma Cave (1,830 m, 6,000 ft).

The highest mountains in the massif are Akhagi at 2,732 metres (8,963 ft), the Peak of Speleologists at 2,705 metres (8,875 ft) and Arabiki at 2,656 metres (8,714 ft).

== Geology ==
The 13-kilometre (8.1 mi)-long massif is composed of Lower Cretaceous and Upper Jurassic limestones that dip continuously southwest to the Black Sea and plunge below sea level.

Large-scale dye tracing experiments conducted in the area in 1984 and 1985 detected the "deepest karst hydrologic system in the world," with a vertical range of at least 2,500 metres (8,200 ft), possibly even 2,700 metres (8,900 ft). It has been speculated that the early karsts were created by the Messinian salinity crisis, which occurred between 5.96 to 5.33 million years ago, which may have temporarily desiccated the Black Sea. Certainly, it took "unique geological and paleogeographic preconditions" to create the deepest cave in the world.

According to Rebecca Felix, the Arabica's "towering heights of limestone suggest the possibility of amazingly deep caves, boring the length of the massif and into the earth below its base".
