= Yereymentau Mountains =

Yereymentau
- Ерейментау
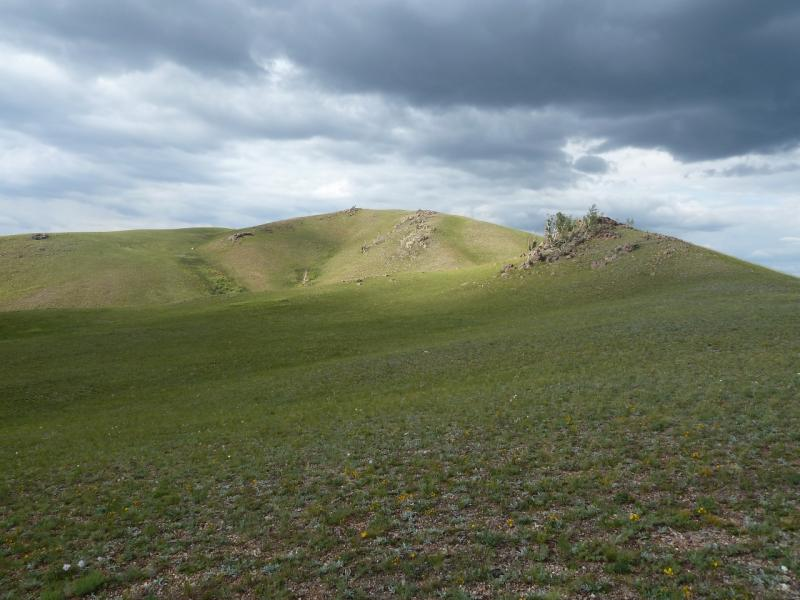
- Landscape of the range

Highest point
- Peak: Akdym
- Elevation: 901 m (2,956 ft)

Dimensions
- Length: 80 km (50 mi) N / S
- Width: 20 km (12 mi) E / W

Geography
- Location within Kazakhstan
- Location: Kazakhstan
- Range coordinates: 51°20′N 73°15′E
- Parent range: Kazakh Uplands

Geology
- Orogeny: Alpine orogeny
- Rock age: Carboniferous
- Rock type: Granite

Climbing
- Easiest route: from Yereymentau

Yereymentau (Kazakh: Ерейментау) is a range of mountains in Akmola and Karaganda regions, Kazakhstan.

Yereymentau city lies at the northern end of the range and the village of Beloyarka at the southern. The Buiratau National Park is located in the Yereymentau Mountains, which are also part of a 364,580 hectares (900,900 acres) Important Bird Area.

== Geography ==
Yereymentau is one of the subranges of the Kazakh Upland system. It is composed by a number of ridges roughly aligned from north to south in the northern section of the range, and from southwest to northeast in the southern. The highest point is the 901 meters (2,956 ft) high Akdym, located in the southern sector. Some of the main ridges of the Yereymentau are Altyntau —highest point 750 metres (2,460 ft)— in the north, Zhartas —highest point 524 metres (1,719 ft)— in the west, Karatau —highest point 661 metres (2,169 ft)— in the east, as well as Bozachikirtau —highest point 658 metres (2,159 ft).

The mountains are of moderate height and have smooth slopes, as well as some rocky outcrops and cliffs in places. River Olenti flows at the feet of the eastern flank of the range. Some right tributaries of the Sileti originate on the western slopes of the Yereymentau and the Moiyldy, a tributary of the Ishim, has its sources at the southern end.

== See also ==
- Geography of Kazakhstan
