= Hydrographer Islands =

Island group in Antarctica

- Location within Antarctica

Geography
- Location: Antarctica
- Coordinates: 67°23′S 48°50′E

Administration
- Administered under the Antarctic Treaty System

Demographics
- Population: Uninhabited

The Hydrographer Islands are a prominent group of small islands in the bay just south of Sakellari Peninsula, Enderby Land, Antarctica. They were photographed by the Soviet Antarctic Expedition (Lena) in March 1957, and by the Australian National Antarctic Research Expeditions in December 1957. They were named "Ostrova Gidrografov" (Islands of the Hydrographers) by the Soviet expedition.

== See also ==
- List of Antarctic and sub-Antarctic islands
