= Igor Demidov =

Russian politician

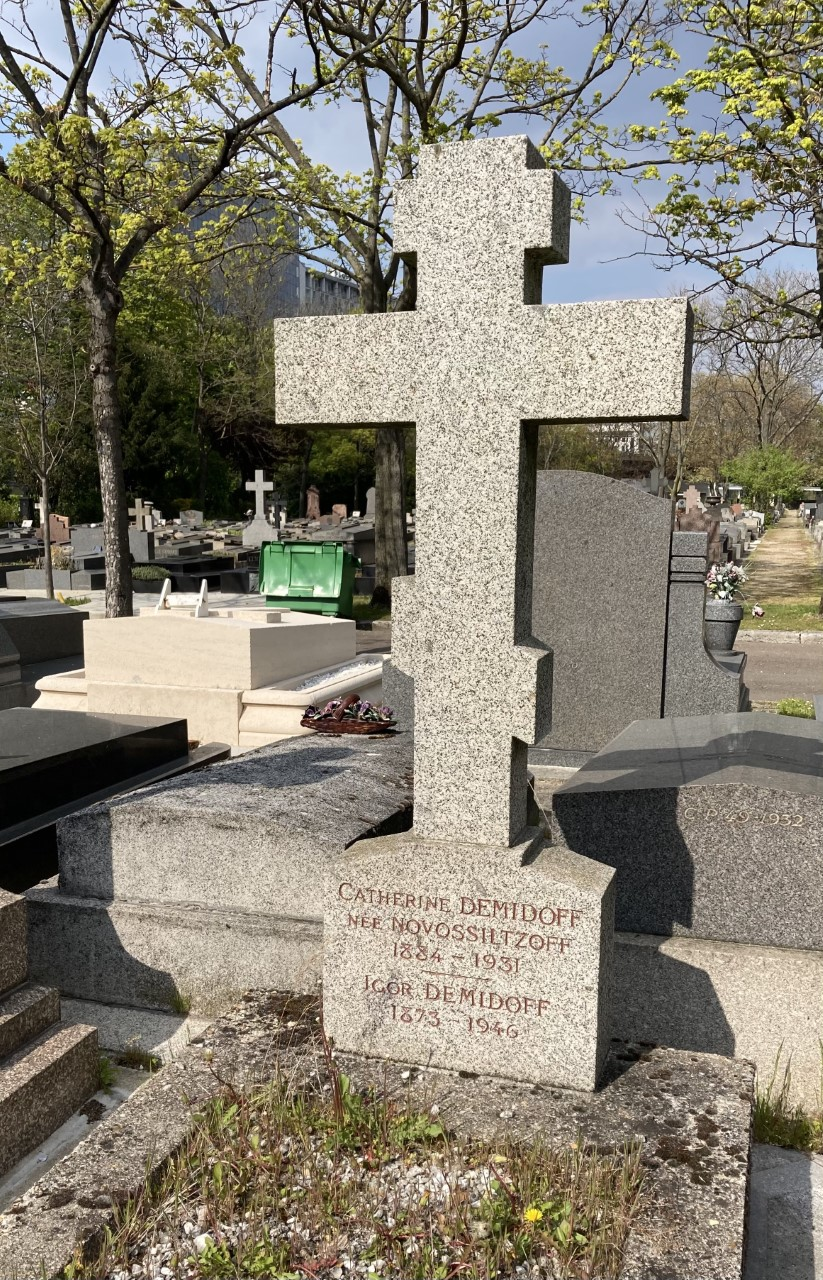
Demidov's grave in Batignolles Cemetery (Paris).

Igor Platonovich Demidov (Russian: Игорь Платонович Демидов; 5 June 1873 – October 20, 1946) was a Russian politician.

A cadet then a member of the State Duma, he went into exile in Paris after the Bolshevik Revolution. He was a member of the editorial staff of the newspaper "Последние новости" ("News"), then its assistant chief editor, and in the early 1920s was also a member of the parish council of St Alexander Nevsky in Paris.

== Sources ==
- (in Russian) State Duma of the Russian Empire, 1906-1917: The Encyclopedia. Moscow: Russian Political Encyclopedia, 2008. С. 158–159. ISBN 978-5-8243-1031-3 . S. 158–159. ISBN 978-5-8243-1031-3.
