= Zavolzhsky, Nikolayevsky District, Volgograd Oblast =

Zavolzhsky Заволжский
- Settlement
- Location within Volgograd Oblast Location within Russia
- Coordinates: 50°13′N 46°01′E
- Country: Russia
- Region: Volgograd Oblast
- District: Nikolayevsky District
- Time zone: UTC+4:00

Zavolzhsky (Russian: Заволжский) is a rural locality (a settlement) in Berezhnovskoye Rural Settlement, Nikolayevsky District, Volgograd Oblast, Russia. The population was 105 as of 2010.

== Geography ==
Zavolzhsky is located 55 km northeast of Nikolayevsk (the district's administrative centre) by road. Berezhnovka is the nearest rural locality.
