= Olenti (Auliekol) =

River in Kazakhstan

Olenti Өлеңті
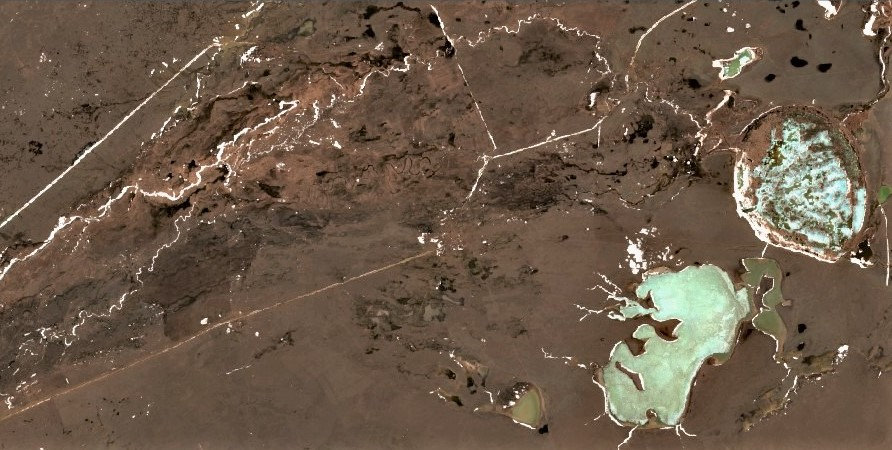
- Final stretch of the Olenti and its mouth in the Auliekol western lakeshore Sentinel-2 image

- Mouth location in Kazakhstan

Location
- Countries: Kazakhstan

Physical characteristics
- Source: Yereymentau; Kazakh Uplands
  - coordinates: 50°54′52″N 72°57′05″E
  - elevation: ca 530 m (1,740 ft)
- Mouth: Auliekol
  - coordinates: 52°11′00″N 74°46′04″E
  - elevation: 126 m (413 ft)
- Length: 273 km (170 mi)
- Basin size: 4,320 km^{2} (1,670 sq mi)
- Discharge
  - average: 0.6 cubic metres per second (21 cu ft/s) at its mouth

The Olenti (Kazakh: Өлеңті; Russian: Оленти) is a river in the Akmola, Karaganda and Pavlodar regions, Kazakhstan. It is 273 kilometres (170 mi) long and has a catchment area of 4,320 square kilometres (1,670 sq mi).

The Olenti belongs to the Irtysh basin. The name of the river originated in the Kazakh word for sedge. There are petroglyphs on the right bank of the lower course of the river, 10 km (6.2 mi) south-west of Tai village, part of the Ekibastuz City Administration.

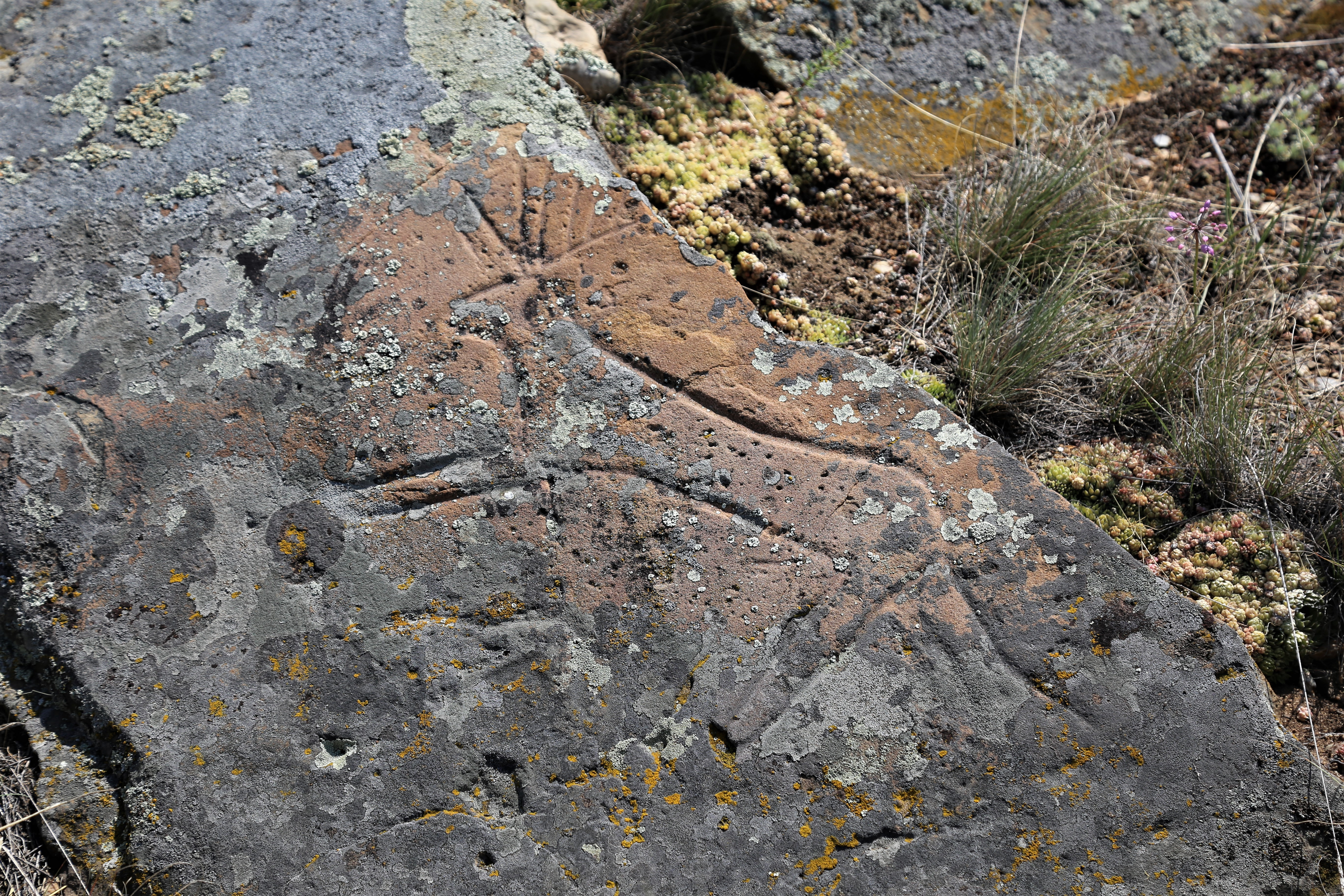
Sample of the Olenti Petroglyphs.

== Course ==
The Olenti has its sources on the eastern slopes of the Yereymentau Mountains of the Kazakh Uplands. It heads roughly northeastwards, skirting the feet of the eastern slopes of the range and bending northwards after a stretch. It bends again northeastwards to the east of lake Teniz and continues in that direction for a long stretch. Shortly before reaching its mouth, the Olenti bends southeastwards and finally it reaches lake Auliekol, entering it from the western shore.

The Olenti flows within a narrow gorge, its width not surpassing 120 m (390 ft), as it heads roughly northwards beneath the mountainous area. After descending into the floodplain, the valley widens reaching 1 km (0.62 mi) to 1.5 km (0.93 mi). The river is fed mainly by snow and groundwater. Its water is fresh and is used for domestic purposes and agricultural field irrigation of the settlements near its banks.

== Fauna ==
The main fish species in the Olenti include pike, crucian carp, perch, roach and tench.

== See also ==
- List of rivers of Kazakhstan
