= Molodyozhny, Zabaykalsky Krai =

Molodyozhny Молодёжный
- Selo
- Location within Zabaykalsky Krai Location within Russia
- Coordinates: 50°17′N 118°59′E
- Country: Russia
- Region: Zabaykalsky Krai
- District: Priargunsky District
- Time zone: UTC+9:00

Molodyozhny (Russian: Молодёжный) is a rural locality (a selo) in Priargunsky District, Zabaykalsky Krai, Russia. Population: 1,103 (2021 census); 1,361 (2010 census); 1,787 (2002 census); There are 19 streets in this selo.

== Geography ==
This rural locality is located 12 km from Priargunsk (the district's administrative centre), 436 km from Chita (capital of Zabaykalsky Krai) and 5,814 km from Moscow. Priargunsk is the nearest rural locality.
