= Zavolzhsky, Pallasovsky District, Volgograd Oblast =

Zavolzhsky Заволжский
- Settlement
- Location within Volgograd Oblast Location within Russia
- Coordinates: 50°03′N 46°53′E
- Country: Russia
- Region: Volgograd Oblast
- District: Pallasovsky District
- Time zone: UTC+4:00

Zavolzhsky (Russian: Заволжский) is a rural locality (a settlement) and the administrative center of Zavolzhskoye Rural Settlement, Pallasovsky District, Volgograd Oblast, Russia. The population was 1,828 as of 2010. There are 17 streets.

== Geography ==
Zavolzhsky is located 2 km north of Pallasovka (the district's administrative centre) by road. Pallasovka is the nearest rural locality.
