= Molodyozhny, Nikolsky District, Vologda Oblast =

Molodyozhny Молодёжный
- Settlement
- Location within Vologda Oblast Location within Russia
- Coordinates: 59°32′N 45°07′E
- Country: Russia
- Region: Vologda Oblast
- District: Nikolsky District
- Time zone: UTC+3:00

Molodyozhny (Russian: Молодёжный) is a rural locality (a settlement) in Krasnopolyanskoye Rural Settlement, Nikolsky District, Vologda Oblast, Russia. The population was 161 as of 2010.

== Geography ==
Molodyozhny is located 22 km west of Nikolsk (the district's administrative centre) by road. Krasnoye Zvedeniye is the nearest rural locality.
