= Maysor =

Lake in Kazakhstan

- Майсор
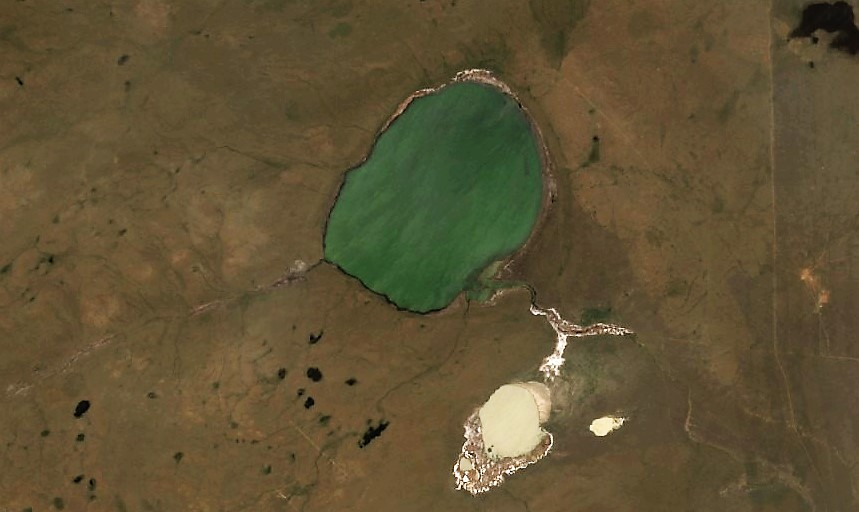
- Sentinel-2 image of the lake

- Location within Kazakhstan
- Location: Bayanaul District
- Coordinates: 51°54′27″N 74°25′56″E
- Type: endorheic
- Basin countries: Kazakhstan
- Max. length: 2.7 kilometers (1.7 mi)
- Max. width: 2.1 kilometers (1.3 mi)
- Surface area: 4.8 square kilometers (1.9 sq mi)
- Residence time: UTC+6
- Shore length^{1}: 8.6 kilometers (5.3 mi)
- Surface elevation: 194 meters (636 ft)
- ^{1} Shore length is not a well-defined measure.

Maysor (Kazakh and Russian: Майсор) is a salt lake in Bayanaul District, Pavlodar Region, Kazakhstan.

There are important ancient burial grounds near the lake. Close to the southwest there is an open-air extraction site of sulphide ore and a sulphide plant. Maysor is located 85 kilometers (53 mi) to the west of Ekibastuz city. Bozshakol village lies 8 kilometers (5.0 mi) to the southwest.

== Geography ==
Maysor is an endorheic lake in the basin of the Shiderti river. The shore is overgrown with reeds. The surrounding area is used as pasture for local cattle. In summers of drought the lake dries and becomes a salt swamp.

Maysor is located in a slight depression of the Kazakh steppe. Lake Teniz lies 53 kilometers (33 mi) to the WSW. There are also other lakes nearby, all of them smaller.

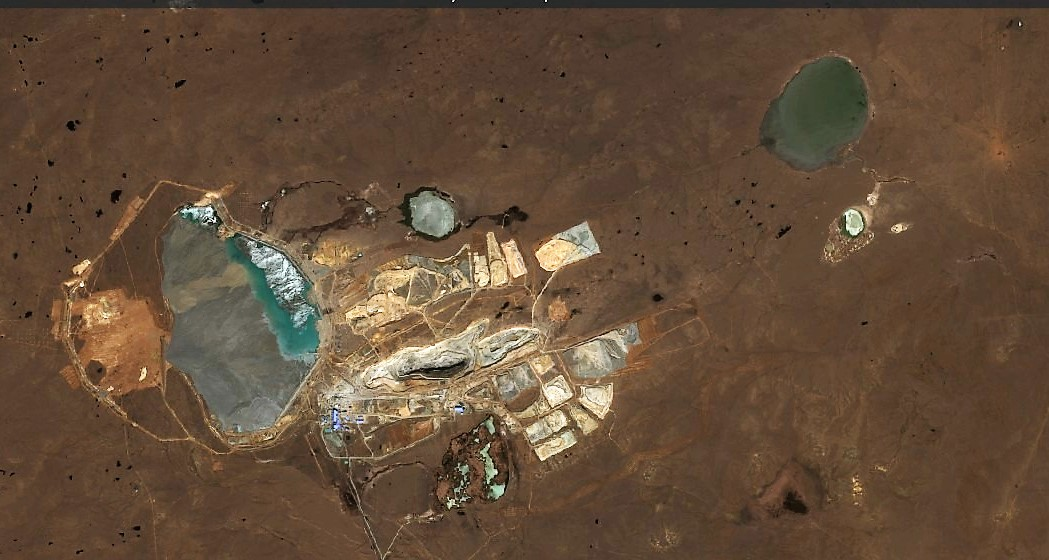
Sentinel-2 image of the lake and nearby mining and processing terrain.

== See also ==
- List of lakes of Kazakhstan
- Sor (geomorphology)
