= Yereymentau District =

Coordinates: 51.619°N 73.096°E

Yereymentau Ерейментау ауданы
- District
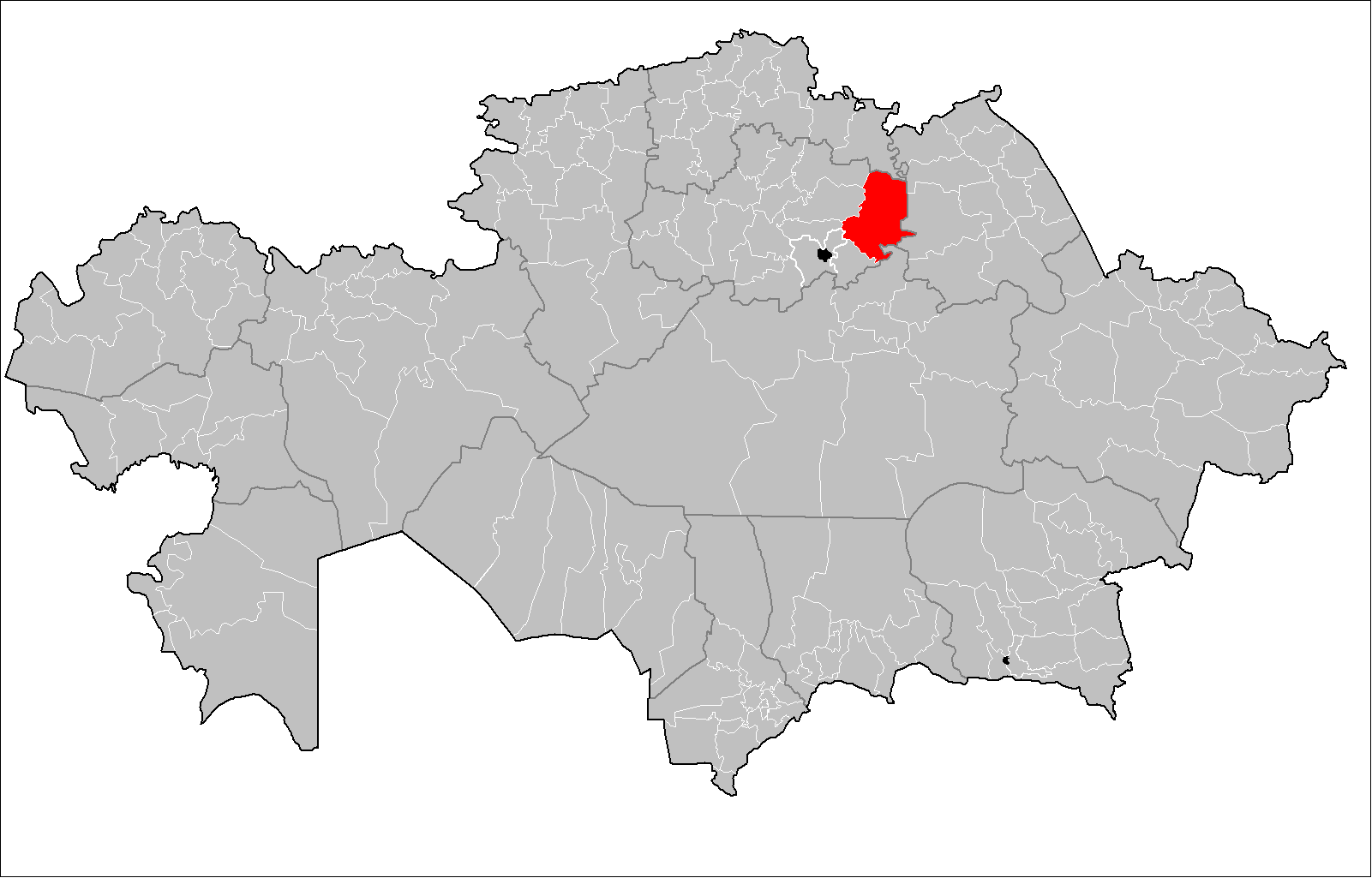
- Country: Kazakhstan
- Region: Akmola Region
- Administrative center: Yereymentau
- Founded: 1928

Government
  - Akim: Nurlan Mukatov

Population (2013)
  - Total: 30,413
- Time zone: UTC+6 (East)

Yereymentau District (Kazakh: Ерейментау ауданы) is a district of Akmola Region in northern Kazakhstan. The administrative center of the district is the town of Yereymentau. Population: 32,236 (2009 census results); 42,246 (1999 census results).

== Geography ==
Teniz and Kobeituz lakes are located in the district, not far from the Yereymentau Mountains. Lake Zhaksytuz lies at the northern end.
