= Pavel Yevgenyevich Demidov =

Russian speleologist (1971–2020)

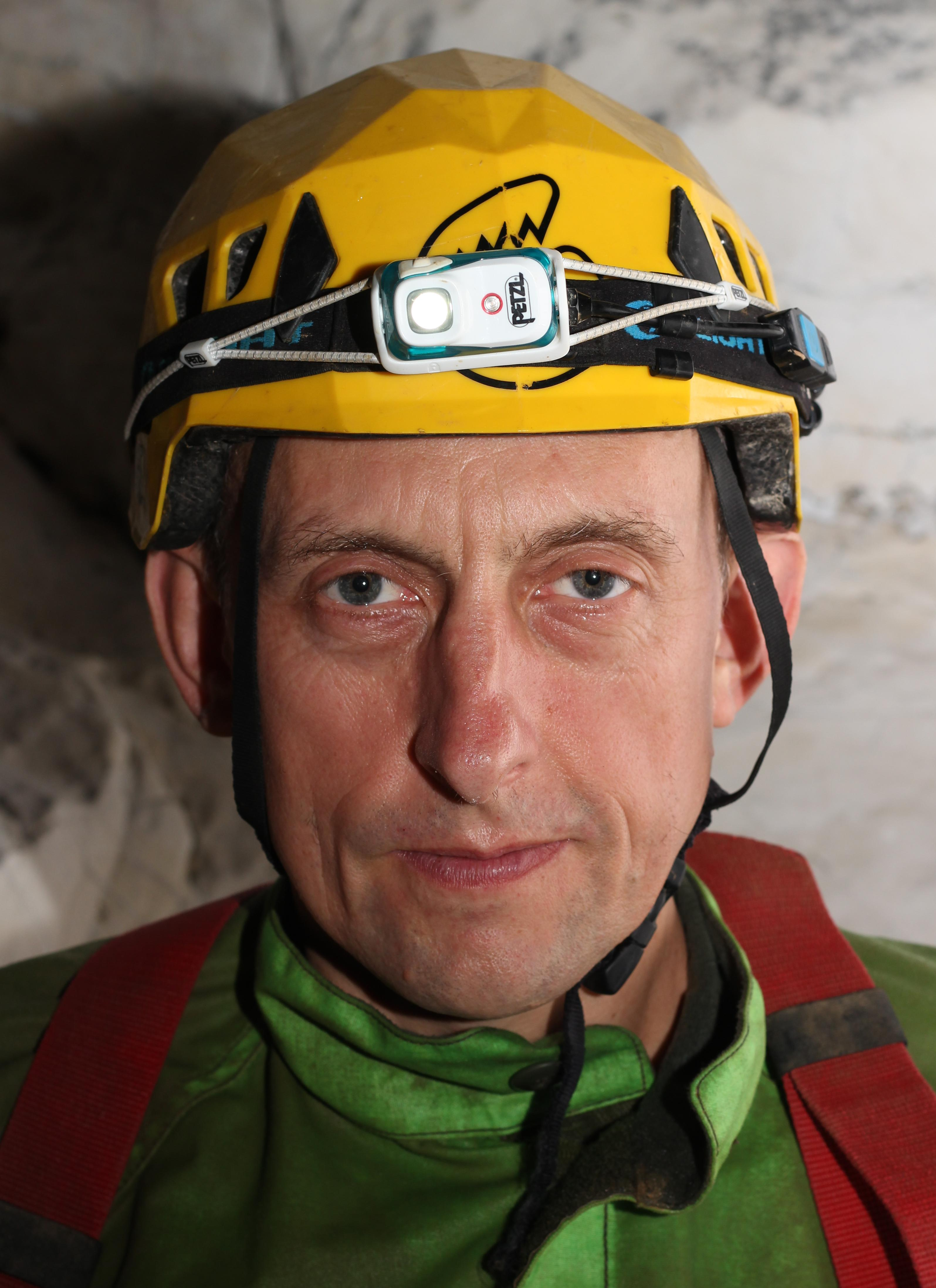
- Demidov in 2019
- Born: 13 August 1971; Moscow, Russian SFSR, Soviet Union
- Died: 23 August 2020 (aged 49); Arabika massif, Abkhazia
- Education: Odesa Maritime Academy
- Years active: 1994–2020
- Known for: Speleology, deep cave projects
- Spouse: Elena Demidova (m. 1994; div. 2013)

Pavel Yevgenyevich Demidov (Russian: Павел Евгеньевич Демидов; 13 August 1971 – 23 August 2020) was a Russian speleologist, most known for his work in extreme cave exploration, especially as the leader of the Perovo-speleo team expeditions to Veryovkina Cave on Arabika massif in Abkhazia, from 2017 the deepest cave in the world.

== Early life, education and career ==
Demidov was born in Moscow to Yevgeny Pavlovich Demidov, a land improvement engineer, and to Elvira Ivanovna Mazeina, an electric assembly technician in missile production. After studying at the School No. 668 (1978–1988) in Moscow, he graduated in navigation at Odesa Maritime Academy (1988–1994). The study included a year and a half at sea, sailing the Black Sea and the Mediterranean Sea on school's training and trading vessels. As there was no suitable job in the Russian merchant fleet for him at the time, he returned to Moscow in 1994. After different jobs, including a 7-month stint aboard a Russian fishing boat in Fiji in 2004 as a representative of ship owner, Tuna Fishing Company, he settled in industrial rope access.

== Speleology ==
During school excursions to the mountains of Crimea, Western Caucasus and during yearly trips to the village Verkhnyaya (Upper) Sysert in the southern Ural Mountains, where his grandmother lived, Demidov developed an interest in nature and in mountain climbing. To get better acquainted with rope climbing he enlisted in the caving school of the Perovo caving club in Moscow in 2000. Peshchera Zabludshikh (Cave of the Lost) of Alek mountain range above Sochi, close to the Black Sea was the first cave he visited, in February 2000. The cave, discovered in 1966, was often visited by caving schools as it is difficult enough and deep enough, to the terminal siphon at −420 m. Demidov and 3 other caving school participants: Pyotr Lyubimov (Petya), Konstantin Zverev (Kostya) and Roman Zverev managed to bypass the siphon and discovered a new branch of the cave on the other side. They made 5 more expeditions in 2000, 3 to the same cave, one to a cave in the Skalisty Range, North Caucasus – and one to Veryovkina cave which was discovered in 1968, rediscovered in 1982 and in 1986 explored to −440 m. The expedition in 2000 was the first to this cave after the 1992/93 war in Abkhazia, and also the first expedition using the single-rope technique. As there are no suitable caves in central Russia caving excursions are always in form of expeditions which usually last from three weeks to one month.

In 2002 Demidov, Lyubimov and both Zverevs founded the Perovo-speleo team and the first cave where the team made a major contribution was Only Stones cave in August 2002, on Arabika massif, in the Dzou area. The cave, discovered by Italians, is close to a lake, at 2,000 m above sea level, and has a tall entrance. At the time it was 200 m deep and they managed to deepen it to 360 m. During an expedition in August 2004 they discovered Vyatskaya cave, in the same area. Only Stones ended with a large collapse while Vyatskaya continued, so they made several further expeditions into it, after several years it was 453 m deep. After 2001 Demidov and the team were also developing several caves on the Bzyb massif, adjacent to Arabika, such as Khabyu cave in 2001, Napra cave in 2001–2003, and Pantyukhinskaya cave in 2008. They also participated in expeditions to caves of other caving clubs, to Krubera-Voronya on Arabika in 2005, to Snezhnaya cave on Bzyb in 2016.

Veryovkina – profile with surface – north-south from the west

== Veryovkina Cave ==
When the team started to work in Veryovkina in 2000 it was 440 m deep with a narrow and long meander at the bottom. It was necessary to carry the excavated material very far. In November 2002 there was one more trip to the bottom: Demidov, Kostya, Petya, Grigory Sanevich (Grisha), also with Danila and Filip Cherednichenko from St. Petersburg. They decided to search for some other continuation on the way from the bottom to the entrance. At the depth of 120 m they discovered a narrow meander, where Demidov managed to pass through, to the top of a shaft. It continued. Every year until 2010 the team advanced, on 6 expeditions, following the draft in windows above the blind shaft bottoms. In 2010 they came to a meander at the depth of 320 to 340 m where they stopped and abandoned further exploration of the cave.

In February 2007 Perovo-speleo started to continue the development of Moskovskaya cave. It is also situated in the Dzou area, it was explored in the eighties to a depth of 980 m; the entrance is at 2,307 m above sea level. Yevgeny Starodubov, the only one left of the team who initially explored the cave, left the cave to Perovo-speleo to develop it further. They made 5 expeditions into it. On the second expedition they dug through a narrow meander, bypassed the siphon and reached the depth of 1,000 m. Further expeditions brought the depth of 1,250 m where an underground creek flows into a siphon. For the work in Moskovskaya cave the team, led by Demidov, was awarded the A. Morozov medal for 2011, the highest Russian award for achievements in speleology. Further expeditions, the last in 2015, discovered several side branches of the cave but none past the terminal siphon. As the team returned to Abkhazian coast in August 2015, to Gagra, they met Aleksey Barashkov, the new president of Perovo caving club, where the team's caving career began. They were also exploring Veryovkina and in 2009 while they traveled to the cave from Gagra, on a track high in the mountain the jeep, a GAZ-66 capsized and two explorers were injured, one badly. So Perovo speleoclub discontinued explorations in Veryovkina, until 2012. In 2013 they broke through a narrow passage at the new bottom (where Perovo-speleo stopped in 2010), at −340 m, and reached a junction of two meanders. One had a strong draft, the other had flowing water (Narnia branch). They followed the water and lost two years in that branch, it was all very narrow. In 2015 they decided to try the meander with draft and with little digging they reached another shaft, at an estimated depth of 360 m, where they stopped because of lack of rope and time. As the cave was developed by both clubs Perovo-speleo, led by Demidov, decided to proceed at that point. In the winter 2015/2016 the access was too difficult so the next, very small expedition took place in June 2016. At the bottom of the last, 30 m shaft, Yevgeny Kuzmin discovered a continuation, Babatunda, the biggest hall in the cave, 155 m deep. They reached the depth of 630 m.

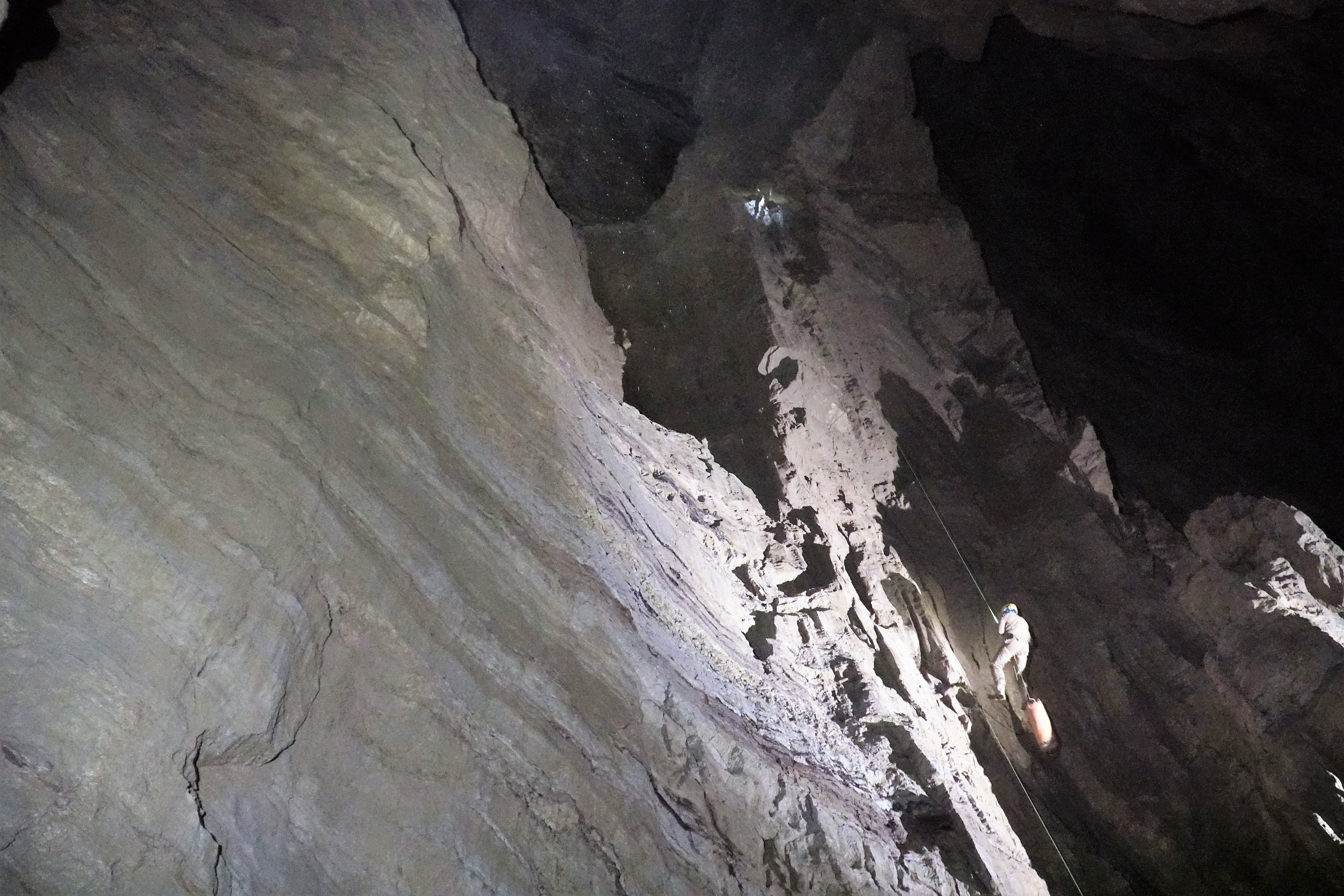
Demidov ascendings the Babatunda pit in Veryovkina cave, photographed by Pyotr Lyubimov

In August 2016 a joint expedition of both teams followed and reached the depth of −1000 m, with an open continuation. During the October/November 2016 expedition of the two teams the cave was deepened to 1350 m, but snow surprised the cavers on exit, roads were impassable, all-road truck could not come and they walked 3 days in the snow to reach the valley. Next expedition in February 2017 used a helicopter to get to the entrance and reached the depth of 1832 m, Veryovkina cave became the second deepest in the world, after Krubera-Voronya. The achievement brought Perovo-speleo team, represented by Demidov, UIS Prize for 2017 in the category The most significant discovery/exploration. In early August 2017 cavers of Perovo speleo club descended to −2155 m, where they found a siphon and returned. In mid-August Perovo-speleo team, with Czech caver Zdeněk Dvořák, mapped 7 km of new horizontal passages, reached an underground river with a flowrate of 500 liters per second and two terminal siphons at the depth of 2204 m. Veryovkina became the deepest cave in the world. In February 2018 a small expedition of 4, led by Demidov, reached 2212 m, final depth of the cave, at the bottom of the Captain Nemo siphon. Several expeditions followed, including a photo trip to the bottom of the cave in September 2018 with the English cave photographer Robbie Shone, during which the team was surprised by a rain storm that flooded the lower level of the cave. Final cave length, 17.5 km, was surveyed in August 2019.

Demidov also helped to promote scientific research in the cave, where it is possible to access an extensive net of passages below −2000 m without diving, from temperature and water pressure measurements to search for new fauna species. Veryovkina cave exploration was presented at several international events, found a wide reaching echo, and Demidov's experience was called for during the cave-related events of general interest.

== Other pursuits ==
In October 2006 Demidov participated in an international expedition to Ghar Parau cave in Iran, in July 2007 he joined the CAVEX team to Sima GESM cave in Sierra de las Nieves mountain range in Spain, in September and October 2007 and in September 2010 he took part in the Sino-Anglo-Russian expedition to deep caves of Tianxing, China. In November 2012 Demidov visited Gran Caverna de Santo Tomás in Viñales, Cuba, in August 2013 caves in Northern Macedonia and in August 2014 he participated in another CAVEX team expedition to Spain, to Sima de las Puertas Illamina (BU56). In January 2017 he attended the International Caving Meeting FinalMenteSpeleo2017 in Italy and in November 2017 he took part in cave rescue training in caves of Chatyr-Dag mountains in Crimea.

In 2004 he worked on a boat at the Fiji islands, where many Russian expatriates also settled, and he returned to Fiji several times later. From November 2008 to March 2009 he crossed the main island, Viti Levu on foot, while the crossing of the second island, Vanua Levu, in 2012 failed halfway because of the wasp bite which required hospitalisation. From January to May 2019 he made a trek over the Viti Levu mountains. The caves of Fiji were not of interest to him.

== Death ==
Because of the COVID-19 pandemic caving expeditions to deep caves on Arabika massif in the summer 2020 were cancelled, yet when the border with Abkhazia reopened on 1 August, a few expeditions nevertheless took place. Demidov joined a CAVEX team expedition to the Integral cave, situated north of Veryovkina, 2,345 m above sea level, and the depth of 200 m. On 23 August, he and Stanislav Khomyakov came to the meander, which was the last explored point of the cave, at a depth of 305 m. The meander begins with a narrow passage among stones and boulders at the bottom of a collapse hall. Both cavers easily overcame this obstacle and, after passing a short meander, came to a small ledge. Demidov went back to fetch a rope, and Khomyakov remained to clear the ledge of loose stones. After a while Khomyakov, worried about Demidov's long absence, climbed back. He saw a new collapse of clay and stones with Demidov in the center of it, without any signs of life.

A large rescue operation followed and on 1 September Demidov's body was lifted to the surface. The following day, 2 September, it was airlifted to Moscow.
