= Zavolzhskoye =

Zavolzhskoye Заволжское
- Selo
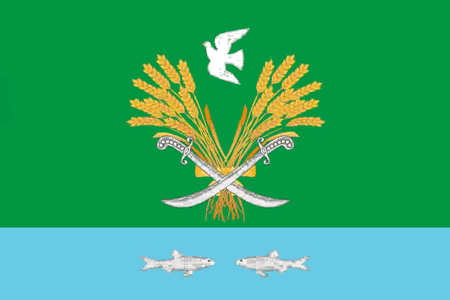
- Flag
- Interactive map of Zavolzhskoye
- Location within Astrakhan Oblast Location within Russia
- Coordinates: 46°58′N 47°36′E
- Country: Russia
- Region: Astrakhan Oblast
- District: Kharabalinsky District
- Time zone: UTC+4:00

Zavolzhskoye (Russian: Заволжское) is a rural locality (a selo) and the administrative center of Zavolzhsky Selsoviet, Kharabalinsky District, Astrakhan Oblast, Russia. The population was 1,467 as of 2010. There are 27 streets.

== Geography ==
Zavolzhskoye is located 65 km southeast of Kharabali (the district's administrative centre) by road. Rechnoye is the nearest rural locality.
