= Molodyozhny, Voronezh Oblast =

Molodyozhny Молодёжный
- Settlement
- Location within Voronezh Oblast Location within Russia
- Coordinates: 50°12′N 39°37′E
- Country: Russia
- Region: Voronezh Oblast
- District: Rossoshansky District
- Time zone: UTC+3:00

Molodyozhny (Russian: Молодёжный) is a rural locality (a settlement) in Novopostoyalovskoye Rural Settlement, Rossoshansky District, Voronezh Oblast, Russia. The population was 289 as of 2010. There are 5 streets.

== Geography ==
Molodyozhny is located 6 km northeast of Rossosh (the district's administrative centre) by road. Khersonsky is the nearest rural locality.
