= Osakarovka =

Osakarovka Осакаровка
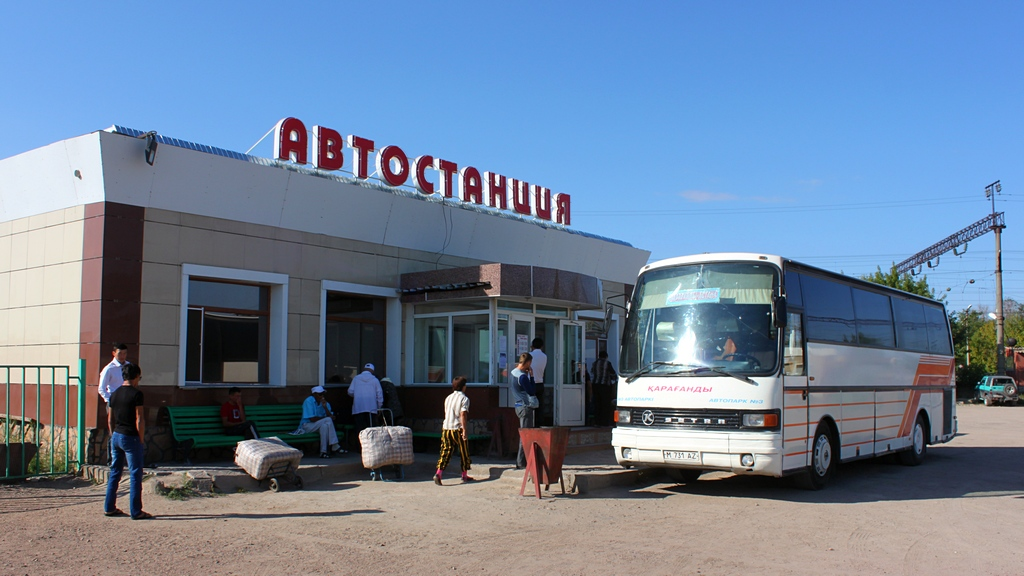
- Osakarovka bus terminal

- Location in Kazakhstan
- Coordinates: 50°33′43″N 72°34′05″E
- Country: Kazakhstan
- Region: Karaganda Region
- District: Sarybel District
- Settled: 1908

Population (2009)
  - Total: 8,046
- Time zone: UTC+6
- Postcode: 101000

Osakarovka (Kazakh: Осакаровка) is a settlement in Sarybel District, Karaganda Region, Kazakhstan. It is the only populated center of the Osakarovka rural district (KATO code - 355630100). Osakarovka was established in 1908 by Ukrainian peasants. Population: 8,046 (2009 census results); 8,080 (1999 census results).

== Geography ==
Osakarovka is located 80 kilometers (50 mi) to the NNW of Karaganda city, west of the Irtysh–Karaganda Canal. The Astana — Karaganda highway passes through Osakarovka. There is also a railway station of the Astana - Karaganda line in the town.
