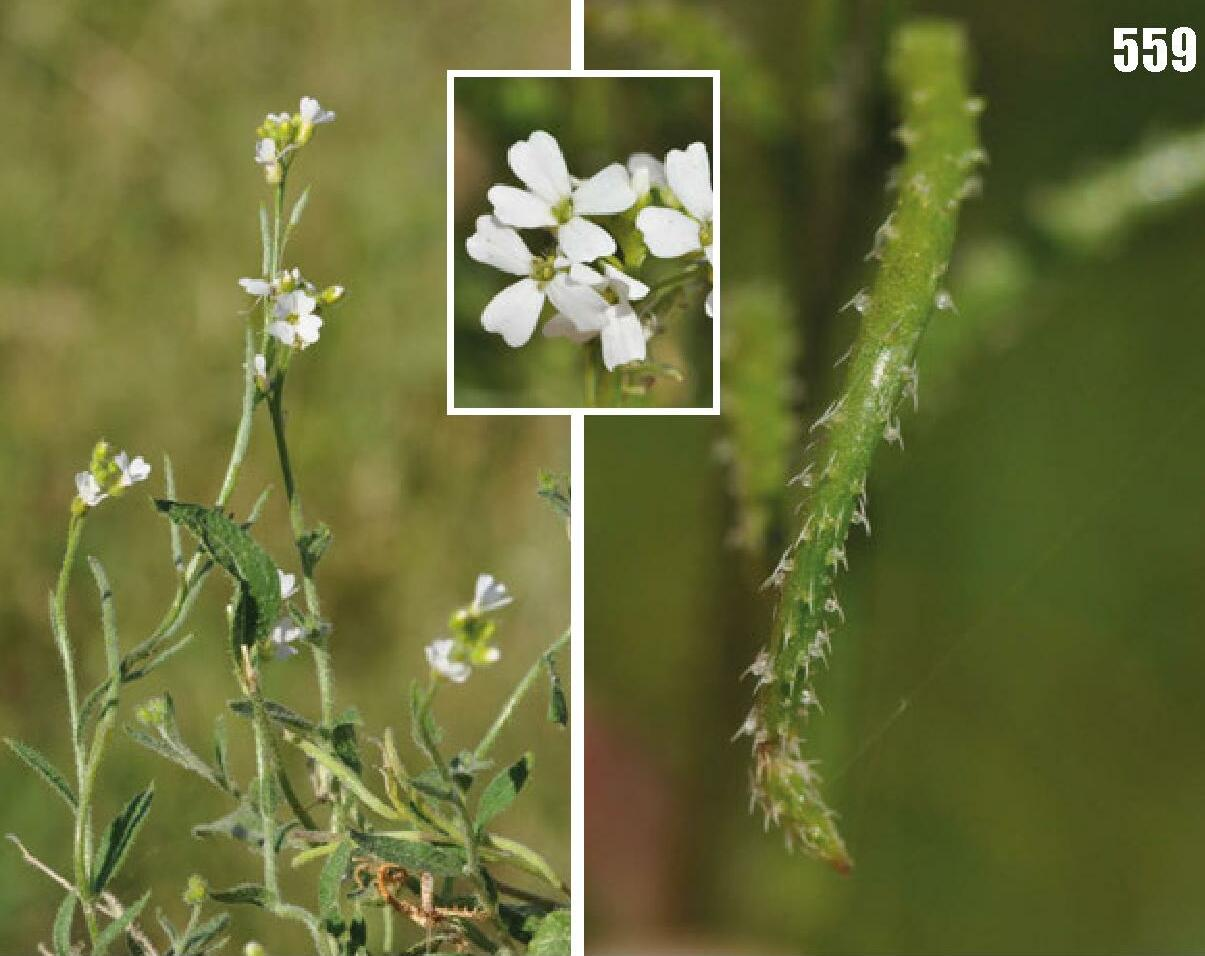
- Cryptospora falcata

Scientific classification
- Kingdom: Plantae
- Clade: Tracheophytes
- Clade: Angiosperms
- Clade: Eudicots
- Clade: Rosids
- Order: Brassicales
- Family: Brassicaceae
- Genus: Cryptospora; Kar. & Kir.

= Cryptospora (plant) =

Genus of flowering plants

Cryptospora is a genus of flowering plants belonging to the family Brassicaceae.

Its native range is Western and Central Asia to Northwestern China.

Species:

- Cryptospora falcata Kar. & Kir.
- Cryptospora inconspicua (Kom.) O.E.Schulz
- Cryptospora trichocarpa Botsch.
