= Yereymentau =

Yereymentau Ерейментау Жаңаныкөл
- Town
- Nickname: New-Nikol
- Location within Kazakhstan
- Coordinates: 51°37′N 73°06′E
- Country: Kazakhstan
- Region: Aqmola Region
- District: Yereymentau District

Population (2009)
  - Total: 12,518
- Time zone: UTC+5 (UTC + 5)

Yereymentau (Kazakh: Ерейментау, Ereimentau; Russian: Ерейментау) is a town in northern-central Kazakhstan. It is the seat of Yereymentau District in Akmola Region. Population: 12,518 (2009 census results); 15,087 (1999 census results).

== History ==
The town was founded in 1948 during the building of the Akmola–Pavlodar railway. In 1951, it was transformed into an urban-type settlement, and in 1965 Yereymentau received the status of a city with district significance.

== Climate ==
Ereymentau has a humid continental climate (Köppen: Dfb), characterized by very cold winters and warm summers.

Climate data for Ereymentau (1991–2020)
Month	Jan	Feb	Mar	Apr	May	Jun	Jul	Aug	Sep	Oct	Nov	Dec	Year
Mean daily maximum °C (°F)	−10.6 (12.9)	−9.3 (15.3)	−1.9 (28.6)	11.5 (52.7)	19.7 (67.5)	24.6 (76.3)	25.5 (77.9)	24.3 (75.7)	17.7 (63.9)	9.6 (49.3)	−2.2 (28.0)	−8.4 (16.9)	8.4 (47.1)
Daily mean °C (°F)	−14.7 (5.5)	−13.7 (7.3)	−6.4 (20.5)	5.5 (41.9)	13.1 (55.6)	18.4 (65.1)	19.6 (67.3)	18.1 (64.6)	11.7 (53.1)	4.4 (39.9)	−6.0 (21.2)	−12.2 (10.0)	3.2 (37.8)
Mean daily minimum °C (°F)	−18.7 (−1.7)	−17.9 (−0.2)	−10.7 (12.7)	0.1 (32.2)	6.7 (44.1)	12.1 (53.8)	14.0 (57.2)	12.2 (54.0)	6.2 (43.2)	-0.0 (32.0)	−9.5 (14.9)	−16.1 (3.0)	−1.8 (28.8)
Average precipitation mm (inches)	21.5 (0.85)	19.0 (0.75)	19.2 (0.76)	23.0 (0.91)	38.3 (1.51)	50.0 (1.97)	69.5 (2.74)	41.1 (1.62)	30.1 (1.19)	30.1 (1.19)	23.9 (0.94)	23.4 (0.92)	389.0 (15.31)
Average precipitation days (≥ 1.0 mm)	6.2	4.7	4.9	5.5	6.9	7.3	8.8	6.2	5.4	6.4	6.1	6.6	75.0
Source: NOAA
