= Sarybel District =

Sarybel
- District
- Сарыбел ауданы
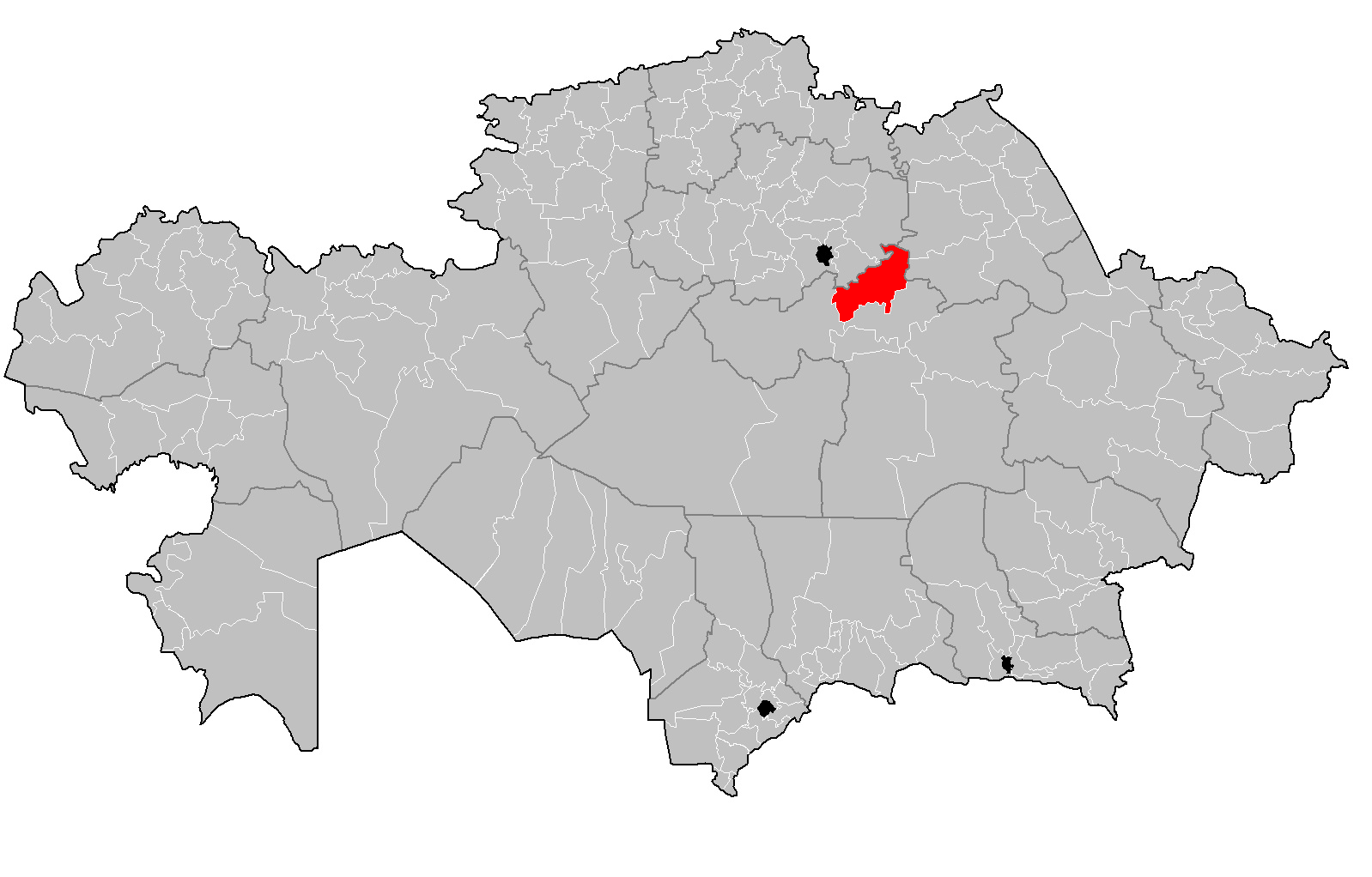
- Coordinates: 50°34′12″N 72°34′48″E
- Country: Kazakhstan
- Region: Karaganda Region
- District: Sarybel District

Government
  - Akim: Ruslan Yesenbekovich Nurmukhanbetov

Population (2019)
  - Total: 31,243
- Time zone: UTC+5

Sarybel District (Kazakh: Сарыбел ауданы), formerly "Osakarov District", is a district of the Karaganda Region in central Kazakhstan. The administrative center of the district is the settlement of Osakarovka. The district had a population of 31,243 as of 2019.

== Geography ==
Nura District lies to the west. River Ulken Kundyzdy and lake Shybyndy are located in the district.

== History ==
During the industrialization of the Soviet Union in the 1930s, the central regions of the Kazakh SSR developed large coal and metallurgic industries, as well as large collective farms. On December 28, 1940, the Supreme Soviet of the Kazakh SSR passed a decree creating the Osakarov District. At the time of the decree, the newly formed district comprised nearly 40 collective farms and a handful of villages. These farms largely grew various cereals, but were also home to cattle, sheep, horses, pigs, and poultry farming. Upon the outbreak of World War II, over 6,000 people in the district went to fight on the Eastern Front, 7 female Komsomol brigades took up work in their absence, and the district's furniture and record factories were converted into producing various equipment parts and linens for the front line effort. As part of the Virgin Lands campaign, a number of new farms were formed in the district during the 1950s and 1960s.

In 1993, 2002, and 2004, a number of villages in the district had their names changed from Russian-derived names to Kazakh-derived names.

== Demographics ==
The district reported 31,243 inhabitants as of 2019. Previously, the district's reported populations were 33,343 (2013 estimate); 35,221 (2009 census results); and 44,317 (1999 census results).

Ethnic Groups of Sarybel District
Ethnic Group	Population (2019)	Percent of Total
Russians	13,935	44.60%
Kazakhs	10,402	33.29%
Germans	1,941	6.21%
Ukrainians	1,617	5.18%
Tatars	737	2.36%
Belarusians	584	1.87%
Chechens	482	1.54%
Greeks	337	1.08%
Moldovans	186	0.60%
Bashkirs	141	0.45%
Mordvins	101	0.32%
Azeris	97	0.31%
Lithuanians	81	0.26%
Poles	80	0.26%
Chuvash	71	0.23%
Koreans	53	0.17%
Uzbeks	19	0.06%
Others	379	1.21%
Total	31,243	100.00%
