= Bykovo, Volgograd Oblast =

Bykovo Быково
- Work settlement
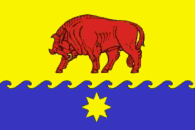
- Flag
- Interactive map of Bykovo
- Location of Bykovo Bykovo (Volgograd Oblast)
- Coordinates: 49°45′52″N 45°23′29″E
- Country: Russia
- Federal subject: Volgograd Oblast
- Administrative district: Bykovsky District
- Founded: 1784

Population (2010 Census)
  - Total: 7,719
  - Estimate (2021): 7,142 (−7.5%)

Administrative status
  - Capital of: Bykovsky District
- Time zone: UTC+3 (MSK)
- Postal code: 404060
- OKTMO ID: 18604151051

Bykovo (Russian: Быково) is an urban locality (a work settlement) and the administrative center of Bykovsky District in Volgograd Oblast, Russia, located on the Volgograd Reservoir. Population: 7,719 (2010 census); 8,250 (2002 census); 7,827 (1989 Soviet census).
