= Bykovsky District =

Bykovsky District Быковский район (Russian)
- District
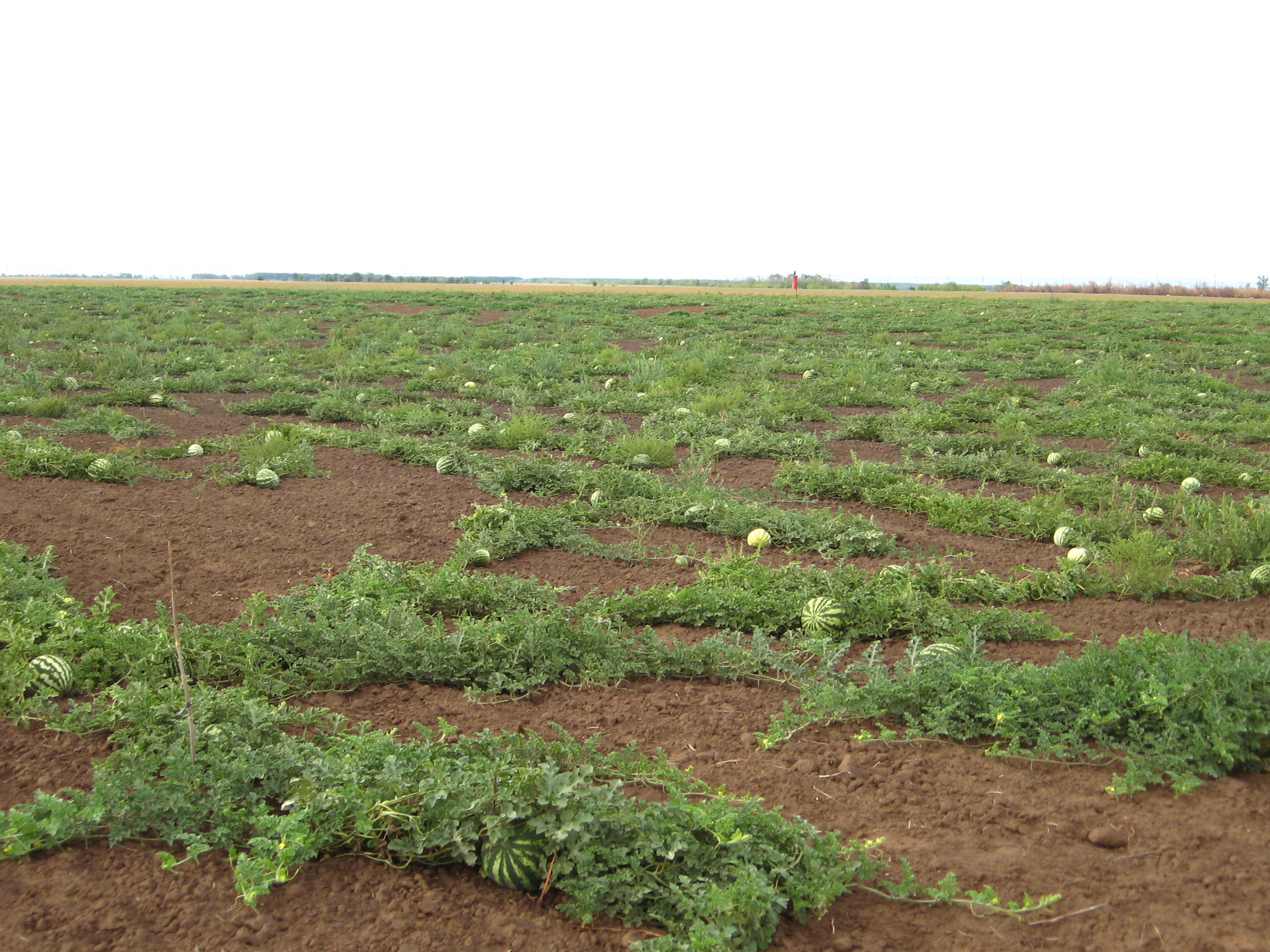
- A water melon field in Bykovsky District

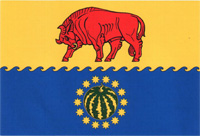
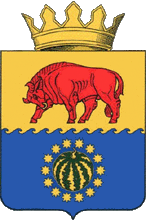
- Flag Coat of arms
- Location of Bykovsky District in Volgograd Oblast
- Coordinates: 49°45′N 45°23′E
- Country: Russia
- Federal subject: Volgograd Oblast
- Established: 1935
- Administrative center: Bykovo

Area
  - Total: 3,410 km^{2} (1,320 sq mi)

Population (2010 Census)
  - Total: 27,055
  - Density: 7.93/km^{2} (20.5/sq mi)
  - Urban: 28.5%
  - Rural: 71.5%

Administrative structure
  - Administrative divisions: 1 Urban-type settlements, 13 Selsoviets
  - Inhabited localities: 1 urban-type settlements, 27 rural localities

Municipal structure
  - Municipally incorporated as: Bykovsky Municipal District
  - Municipal divisions: 1 urban settlements, 13 rural settlements
- Time zone: UTC+3 (MSK)
- OKTMO ID: 18604000
- Website: http://bykovsky.volganet.ru/

Bykovsky District (Russian: Бы́ковский райо́н) is an administrative district (raion), one of the thirty-three in Volgograd Oblast, Russia. As a municipal division, it is incorporated as Bykovsky Municipal District. It is located in the east of the oblast. The area of the district is 3,410 square kilometers (1,320 sq mi). Its administrative center is the urban locality (a work settlement) of Bykovo. Population: 27,055 (2010 census); 28,572 (2002 Census); 27,151 (1989 Soviet census). The population of Bykovo accounts for 28.5% of the district's total population.
