= Schönberg Cave System =

World's 14th longest cave (155.6 km) located in Switzerland

Schönberg-Höhlensystem
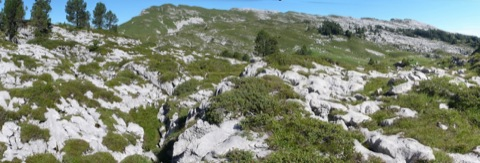
- Lapiaz (eroded calcareous rock) still partially covered by vegetation on the Sieben Hengste massif.

- Location within Austria
- Location: Totes Gebirge, Austria
- Coordinates: 47.7177604°N 13.7874445°E
- Depth: 1,061 m (3,481 ft)
- Length: 156.9 km (97.5 mi) 155.637 m
- Height variation: 1061 m
- Discovery: AD 1966
- Geology: Limestone
- Entrances: 42
- Website: www.hoehlenforschung.at

The Schönberg cave system in the Dead Mountains is with a currently known length of over 155.018 m the longest cave in Austria. It got its name after the connection of the approximately 33 km long Feuertal-Höhlensystem with the approximately 86 km long Raucherkarhöhle was discovered. The overlying Schönberg-Höhlensystem (2093 m) gave the system its name.

The widely branched cave with 35 entrances is located at Bad Ischl in the border area between Upper Austria and Styria. The area around the Schönberg cave system is researched, measured and mapped by the Landesverein für Höhlenkunde Oberösterreich. The Schönberg cave system is located at place 14 on the list of the longest caves in the world. Within Europe there are longer systems on the territory of Ukraine (Optymistychna Cave), Switzerland (Hölloch, Siebenhengste-Hohgant-Höhle) and Spain's (Sistema del Alto). It is the 14th longest cave system in the world.

== Geology ==
The Schönberg cave system is located in a large block of the Dachstein Formation of the Northern Limestone Alps. These were shifted north in the rocks of the European continental edge shifting in several tectonic partial ceilings in several tectonic partial ceilings. The rocks were heavily stressed, partly folded and srugged. Along this ventilation, rainwater penetrated into the rock and led to the formation of caves as typical karst phenomena. The preferred orientation of the ventilation in the rock runs from southwest to northeast, so that the resulting cave systems also have this orientation.

== Sources ==
- Harald Zeitlhofer; Gerald Knobloch (2008). "The Raucherkarhöhle (1626/55) as part of the Schönberg cave system" (PDF). Journal of Karst and Speleology. 59. Wien: Association of Austrian Speleologists: 73–82.
- Wolfgang Jansky; Clemens Tenreiter; Ludwig Pürmayr (2008). "The Feuertal cave system as part of the Schönberg cave system (1626/300)" (PDF). Journal for Karst and Speleology. 59. Wien: Association of Austrian Caves: 83–95.

== See also ==
- List of deepest caves
- List of longest caves
