= Ojo Guareña =

Cave and archaeological site in Spain

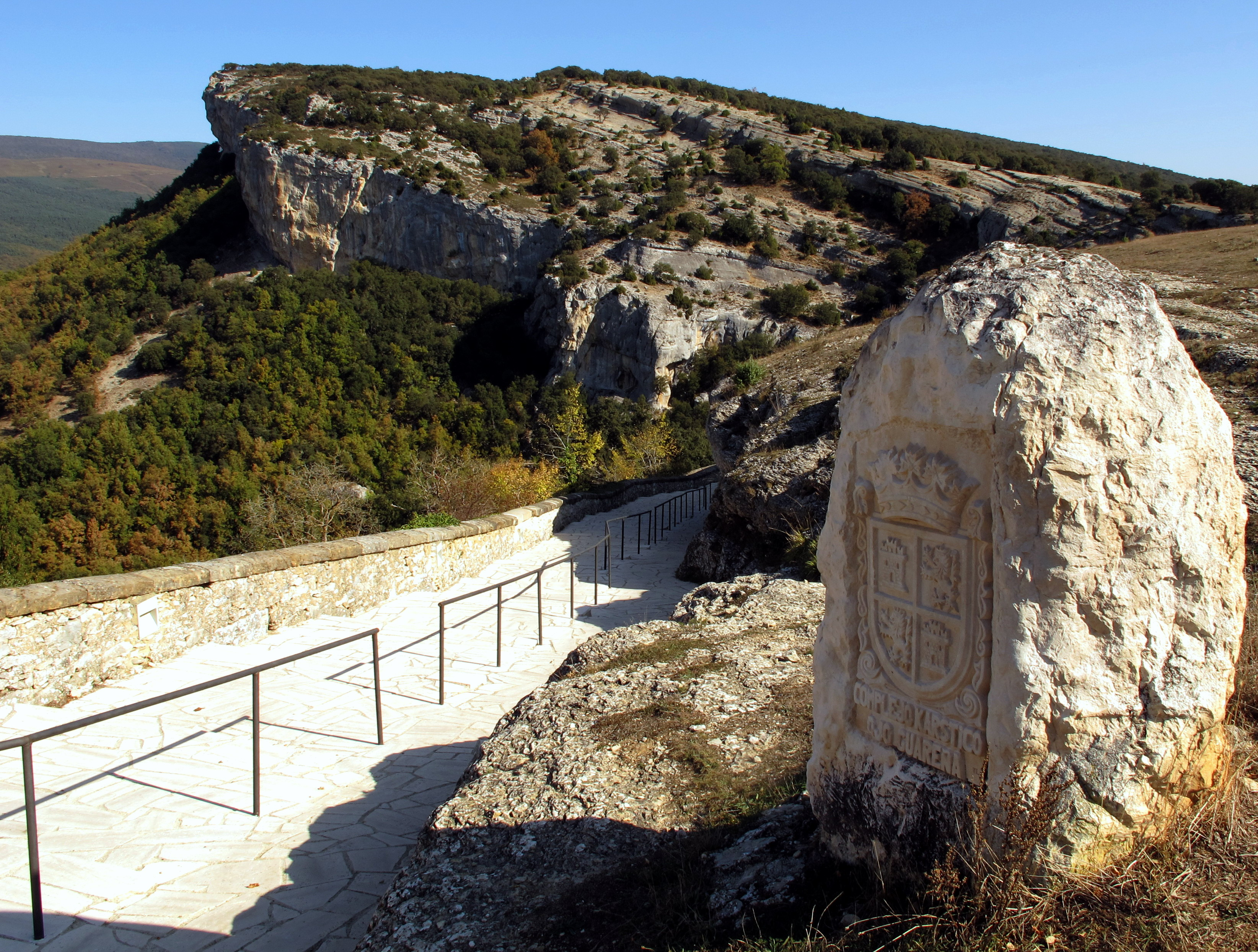
- Site of the natural monument of Ojo Guareña

- Location within Spain
- Location: Province of Burgos, Spain
- Coordinates: 43°02′00″N 3°39′00″W
- Geology: Coniacian limestone
- Entrances: 10

Ojo Guareña is a karst complex located in the Cantabrian Mountains of Castile and Leon, Spain, declared a natural monument by the government of Castile and Leon in 1996. It is composed of over 90 kilometres (56 mi) of galleries and passages within an area of some 13,850 hectares (34,200 acres). The limestone formation containing the system is approximately 100 metres (330 ft) thick and sits on a massive water-resistant layer of marl. The caves were formed in the limestone by erosion sometime within the Coniacian Age. Ojo Guareña was considered the greatest karst system of the Iberian Peninsula until 2009, when a significant length of new passages was discovered in the Mortillano system. It is also the 24th longest cave system.

Archaeological findings in the area indicate that various caves in the Ojo Guareña system were used by humans as early as the Middle Palaeolithic up until the Middle Ages. Scientific exploration has also discovered the presence of over 180 species of invertebrates in the complex.

Tourist access to the caverns is permitted, and there is a visitor's centre located in Quintanilla del Rebollar.

== Features ==
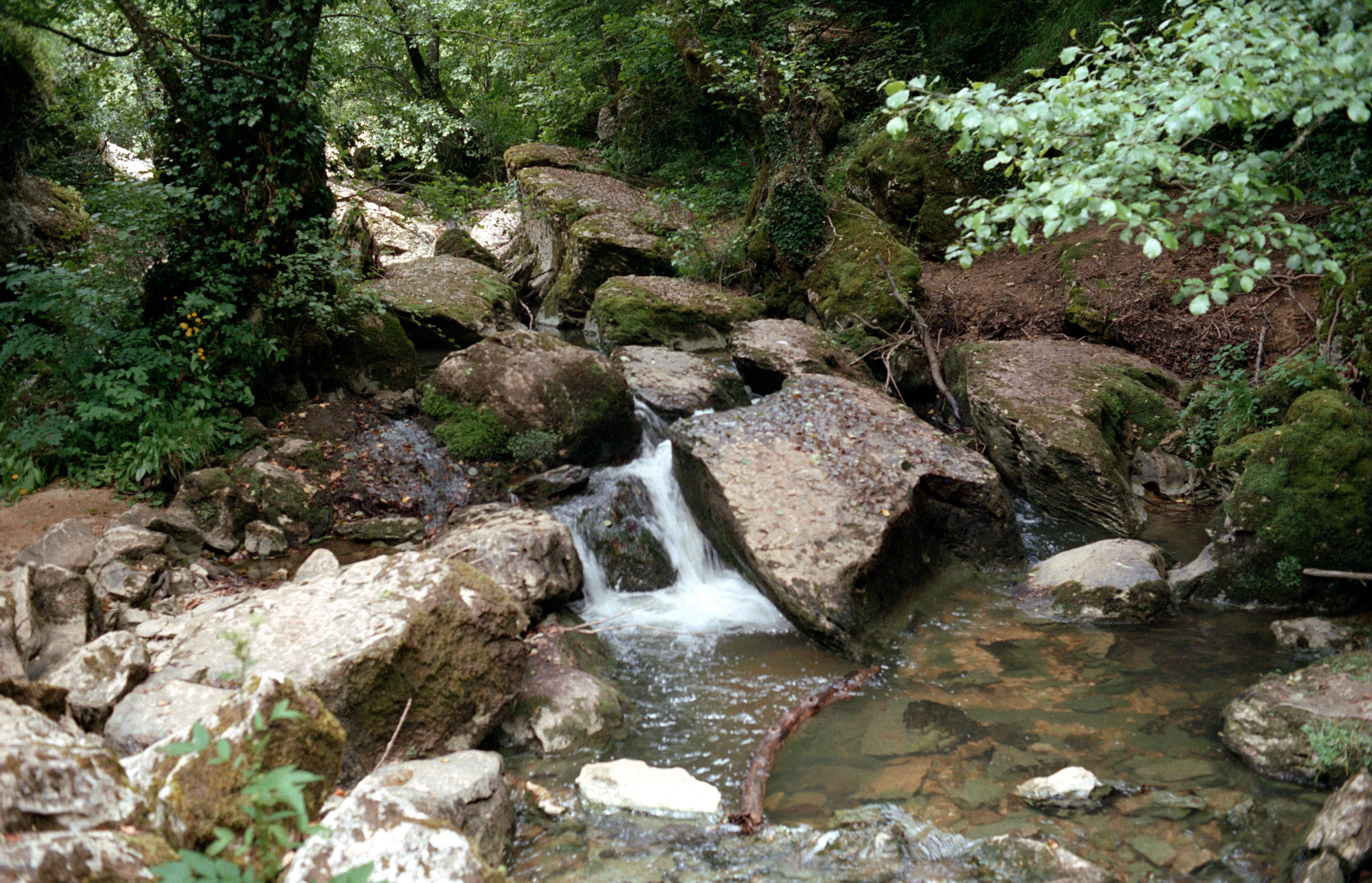
The river Guareña, before flowing into the Ojo Guareña karst complex.

The karst complex of Ojo Guareña consists of a massive network of over galleries and cavities, not all of which are connected, occupying an area of about 13,000 ha. The main network consists of fourteen caves that are connected with each other over six different levels of the system. The most prominent entry point is at Palomera Cave.

Ojo Guareña was formed by the erosive action of the Guareña and Trema rivers, in addition to the Villamartín stream. These bodies of water run through the lower galleries for most of the year, although during flood season it is possible for the water to enter the higher galleries. Eventually, they return to the outside through karst springs at Trema, Torquilla, Torcón and Torcona, located on a lower section of Trema River. The groundwater runs through Ojo Guareña at a speed of 1.5–5 km per day, depending on whether the measurement is made during the drier summer or the flood season. The groundwater feeds an aquifer located in the hinge of the area's syncline fold.

== Flora and fauna ==
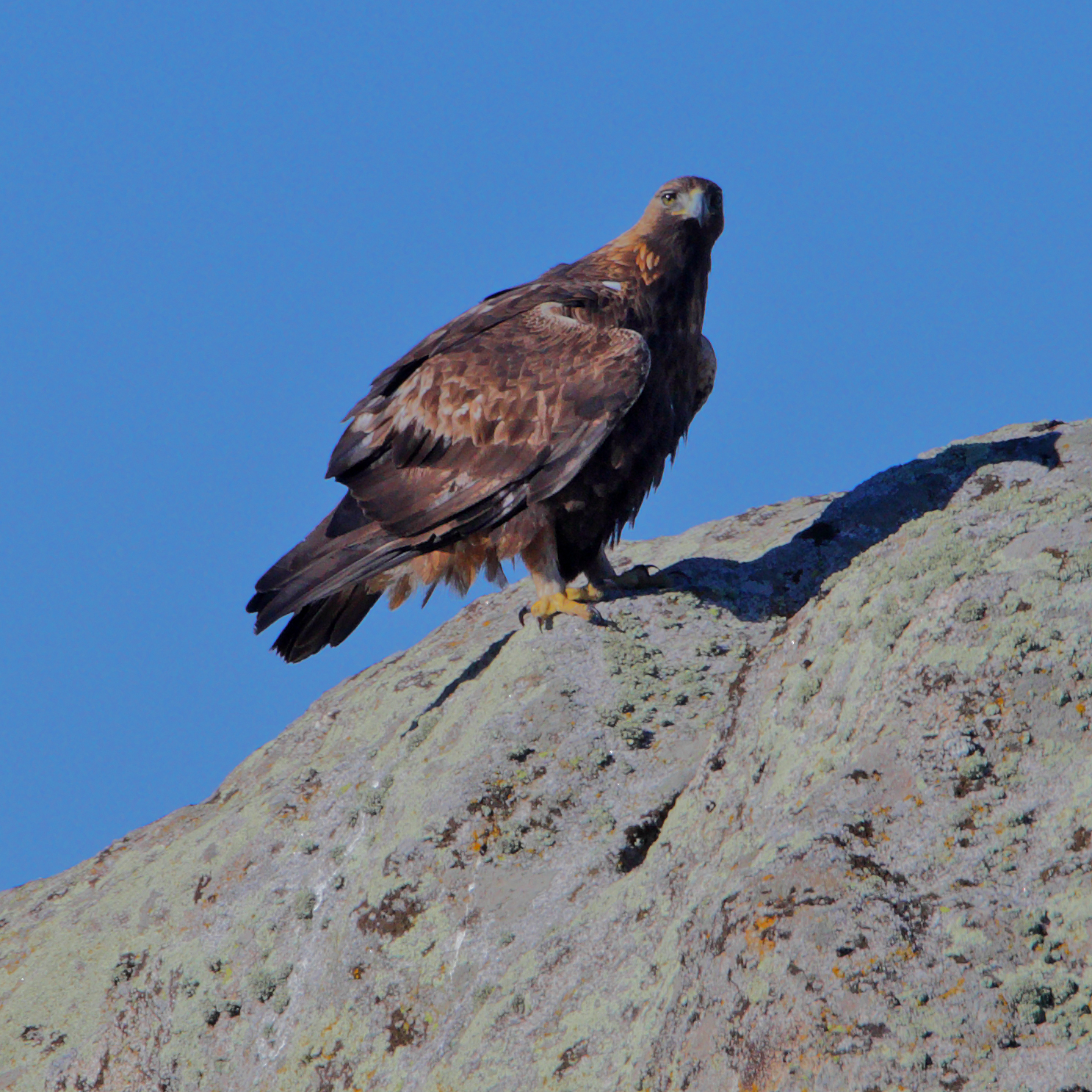
Golden eagles commonly nest in the area of the Ojo Guareña.

A number of birds live in the area surrounding the cave complex, including the golden eagle, short-toed snake eagle, Egyptian vulture, Eurasian sparrowhawk, Eurasian eagle-owl, griffon vulture, tawny owl, and the peregrine falcon. Inside the caves there are several species of bats, such as the cave bat, greater horseshoe bat, lesser horseshoe bat, and Geoffroy's bat. Other mammal species that live in the region include the Pyrenean desman, wildcat, dormouse or the Eurasian otter.

In 2012, a paper was released documenting the presence of 187 invertebrate species in Ojo Guareña, belonging to a variety of phyla. 32 of them were entirely new to science. Of the more than 200 cave-dwelling aquatic invertebrates that are known in Spain, more than a quarter of them were discovered in Ojo Guareña.

The vegetation in the Ojo Guareña area is very diverse due to its location in a transition zone between the Mediterranean and Euro-siberian climate regions. The surface of the natural monument is occupied by meadows, grasslands, heathlands and Iberian forests. A number of types of trees are found in these forested areas, including multiple varieties of oak, beech, hazel, poplar, alder, pine, and aspen.

== Archaeology ==
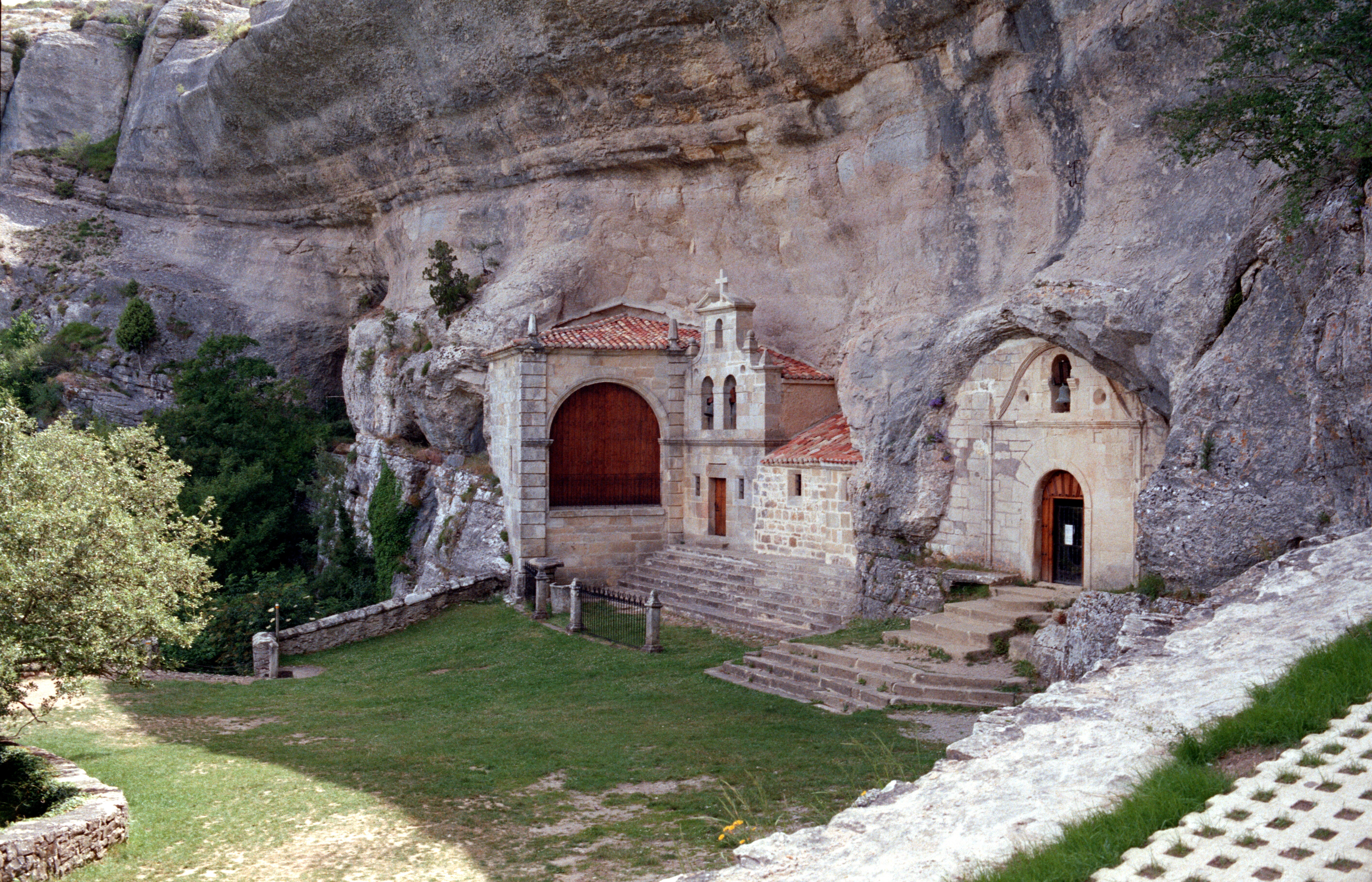
Hermitages carved into the limestone within Ojo Guareña.

Evidence has been found to indicate the presence of human beings in and around the caves of Ojo Guareña from at least as early as the Middle Palaeolithic up until the Middle Ages.

=== Palaeolithic ===
The oldest signs of human presence, including cave paintings and tools, in the complex of Ojo Guareña are in the cave of Prado Vargas. Excavations in 1973 located prehistoric pottery fragments. In 1986, more pottery fragments and stone tools were located, indicating a possible Neanderthal presence. In 2006, some 400 Mousterian pieces were located and the site was classified as an archaeological industry. Impressions of footprints making a round trip, accompanied by torch fragments that have been radiocarbon dated to as old as 15,600 years, indicate that the cave has been in use for millennia.

=== Neolithic and Bronze Age ===
In the Cave of Kaite, paintings have been found that appear to represent deer. On the walls and the vault of the Sala de la Fuente, or Fountain Room, are paintings that depict people, animal forms, and geometric drawings. These images span a period of time between the late Neolithic and the beginning of the Bronze Age.

== Protected status ==
On March 14, 1996, Decrees 60/1996 and 61/1996 were issued, approving the Natural Resource Management Plan for Ojo Guareña (Burgos) and declaring the official status of Ojo Guareña as Natural Monument of Ojo Guareña (Burgos). Decree 174/1998, of September 3, 1998, regulates the composition of the Governing Board of the Ojo Guareña Natural Monument.

== See also ==
- List of longest caves
