= Baisuntau =

Mountain range in southeastern Uzbekistan

Coordinates: 38.696016°N 67.490172°E

The Baisuntau mountain range (Uzbek: Boysuntogʻ; Russian: Байсунтау) is the southwestern continuation of the Gissar Mountains, in southeastern Uzbekistan. This in turn continues in a southwesterly direction with the Kugitangtau chain.

== Geography ==
The Baisuntau extends for a length of approximately 150 km (93 mi) in a northeast/southwest direction. It culminates at an elevation of 4,424 m (14,514 ft). From its northwestern and northern slopes arise several left-hand tributaries of the Kashkadarya River, including the Akdarya. The south-eastern slope of the mountain range is drained by the Surkhandarya river system.

== Geology ==
The mountain range is made up of limestone, sandstone, and clay. The lower slopes are covered by semi-desert type vegetation; higher up there are juniper forests and alpine meadows.

At the southern end of the mountain range is the Teshik-Tash cave, a famous archaeological site. Other caves in the region are:

- Boybuloq (14.2 km long, 1,415 m deep),
- Festivalnaya (16 km long, 625 m deep) and
- the Dark Star cave (9.5 km long, 858 m deep), believed to be the longest cave in Uzbekistan, and possibly the deepest in the whole world.
