= Fisher Ridge Cave System =

Cave system in the United States

- Location within Kentucky
- Location: Hart County, Kentucky, United States
- Coordinates: 37.25°N 86.64°W
- Length: 130.001 miles
- Discovery: January 1981

The Fisher Ridge Cave System is a cave system located in Hart County, Kentucky, United States, near Mammoth Cave National Park. As of November 2019 it had been mapped to a length of 130.001 miles (209.216 km), making it the fifth-longest cave in the United States and the eleventh-longest in the world.

== Discovery ==
The earliest visitors to the Fisher Ridge Cave System were Archaic Native Americans who explored the cave. They scratched a lattice or checkerboard pattern onto a large breakdown boulder. Pieces of charcoal from a cane torch dated to approximately 3000 BCE and footprints were also found in the cave. Prehistoric explorers of the cave likely used a different entrance from the ones that are known now, particularly given that the only known natural entrance to the cave is a low wet crawl, but it is not clear which entrance may have been used and it may no longer exist.

The cave was rediscovered in January 1981 by a group of Michigan cavers. The group had originally intended a trip to Crump Spring Cave, but decided to search for new caves on Fisher Ridge, where cavers had long suspected a large cave might exist. Chip Hopper dug into a sinkhole near the sandstone contact to find the "Historic" entrance. It soon proved to be a substantial discovery, with long and branching passageways that they named the Fisher Ridge Cave System. They subsequently mapped nearly 10 miles in the following year and decided to form the Detroit Urban Grotto of the National Speleological Society as a group dedicated to mapping the new cave system.

== History of exploration ==
The major history of the cave can be broken into several important time periods.

Exploration under Fisher Ridge proceeded from 1981 through 1992 with nearly 50 miles (80 km) explored. A major discovery in 1981 of Fisher Avenue, stretching over two miles, became the backbone of the cave. Remington entrance was dug open which made access to Fisher Avenue easier. A third entrance originated from a connection with a small nearby cave, called "Splash". Active stream levels included Fisher River, Stinky River, Detroit River, and Thunder River. Extensions to the north led to a parallel set of large, older upper level trunk passageways including Larry's Borehole, Grand Ave, and Ice Cave Ave higher in the system than Fisher Ave. In 1983 a flood washed out a new segment of cave that resulted in over 10 miles of discoveries on the southern end, including the South Fisher Extension and the 80 ft tall canyon called the Big One.

Explorers in the 1990s began to push toward Northtown Ridge to the northwest. Chartres Ave was discovered with over a mile of large walking tunnel beyond the 1000 ft crawl. In 1993, beyond Chartres Ave and the Chartres Maze, and through the Penny Lane Crawl, major breakthroughs proceeded under Northtown Ridge. From 1993 to 1996 Fisher Ridge gained an additional 30 miles. This included the multi-mile Northtown Avenue and Doll's Head Trunk, as well the Lost Carbide Trunks, and the large water table level stream passage Park Avenue. These trips required multi-day extended base camps because of the long travel times.

Two flood-trapping events during Northtown Ridge base camps prompted the Detroit Urban Grotto cavers to develop a better access route. Work commenced on a new entrance, the fourth and final for the cave system. It was completed in 1997 and greatly facilitated exploration under Northtown Ridge.

Explorers from the Detroit Urban Grotto had explored 100 miles of Fisher Ridge Cave System by 2001, after 20 years.

The next 20 years saw an additional 30 miles of exploration throughout all parts of the cave. Explorers no longer originate primarily from Michigan and instead travel from all over the country.

== Cave description ==
Fisher Ridge Cave System contains two large segments connected only by a 1,000 feet (300 m) long crawl in between. The Northtown Ridge portion of the cave contains about 80 miles (130 km) including a number of large dry tunnels reminiscent of Mammoth Cave. The Fisher Ridge segment is about 50 miles (80 km), including several active streams and two major mid-level trunk sections. A continuous set of abandoned trunk passages spans 5.5 miles (8.9 km) from one end of the cave to the other, including Fisher Avenue, Hunky Dory, Chartres Ave, Dolls Head, Northtown Ave, and Park Ave. These eventually drain to the Green River (Kentucky), and are only briefly interrupted by collapses or fills.

== Lack of connection ==
The Fisher Ridge Cave System has not yet been found to connect to the nearby Mammoth Cave system, despite a separation of only 600 feet (180 m) between the nearest cave passages. The closest approach between the two caves is located high in the ridges between unrelated passages, which is unfavorable for connection efforts. Additionally, a drainage divide exists between the bulk of the two cave systems. The most likely location of connection, if one exists, is deeper in the active base-level streams of the caves, since erosion of the valleys between ridges tends to separate previously connected cave passages located higher in the caves. Surveyed cave passages run inside the boundary of Mammoth Cave National Park, although in that location there is almost a mile between it and Flint Ridge passageways in Mammoth Cave. Opinions vary on whether the caves will eventually be connected. Early cavers in Fisher Ridge discouraged efforts to identify a connection. However, Fisher Ridge and Mammoth Cave explorers have continued thorough exploration without a connection or promising passageways toward one having been identified.

== See also ==
- List of caves in the United States
- List of longest caves in the United States
- List of longest caves
