= Hirlatzhöhle =

Cave in Austria

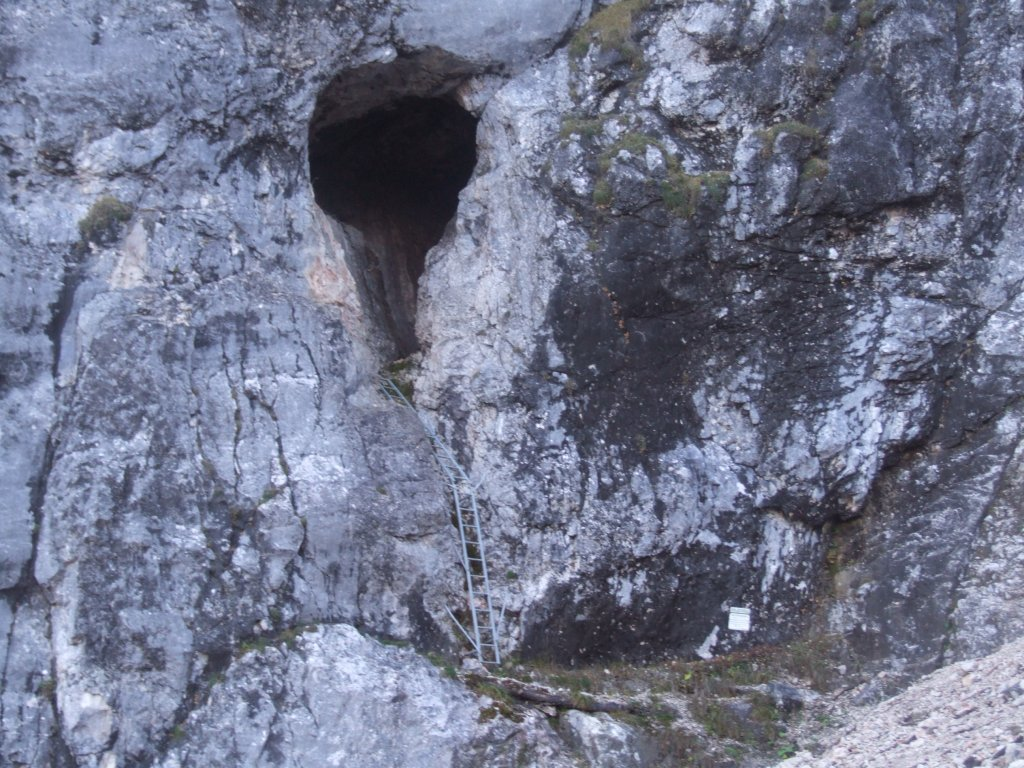
- Interactive map of Hirlatzhöhle
- Location: Österreich
- Coordinates: 47°32′42″N 13°37′51″E
- Depth: 1,559 metres (5,115 ft)
- Length: 118,250 metres (387,960 ft)
- Elevation: 870 m (2,850 ft)
- Discovery: 1949
- Geology: Limestone
- Entrances: 6

The Hirlatzhöhle is a cave in the Dachstein massif in the municipality of Hallstatt in the Upper Austrian part of the Salzkammergut. The total length of the cave known to date is over 115 km. It is therefore the third longest cave in Austria and, at 1559 m deep, the second deepest cave in Austria. The deepest point is at 443 m above sea level and therefore 65 m below the water level of the nearby Hallstättersee. It is the 21st longest cave in the world.

== Geography ==
It extends from Oberfeld in the east to Gamskogel in the west. The east–west extent is 5445 m, the north–south extent is 3662 m. Vertically, the cave extends over 1560 meters, reaching from 2003 m down to 443 m above sea level.

The cave has six entrances. Three of them are only usable for divers, another is in a steep rock face and the fifth only opens up a small part of the cave without diving. Due to these circumstances, there is actually only one usable entrance for efficient exploration, which results in complex expeditions lasting several days for exploration, especially in areas far from daylight.

== Exploration ==
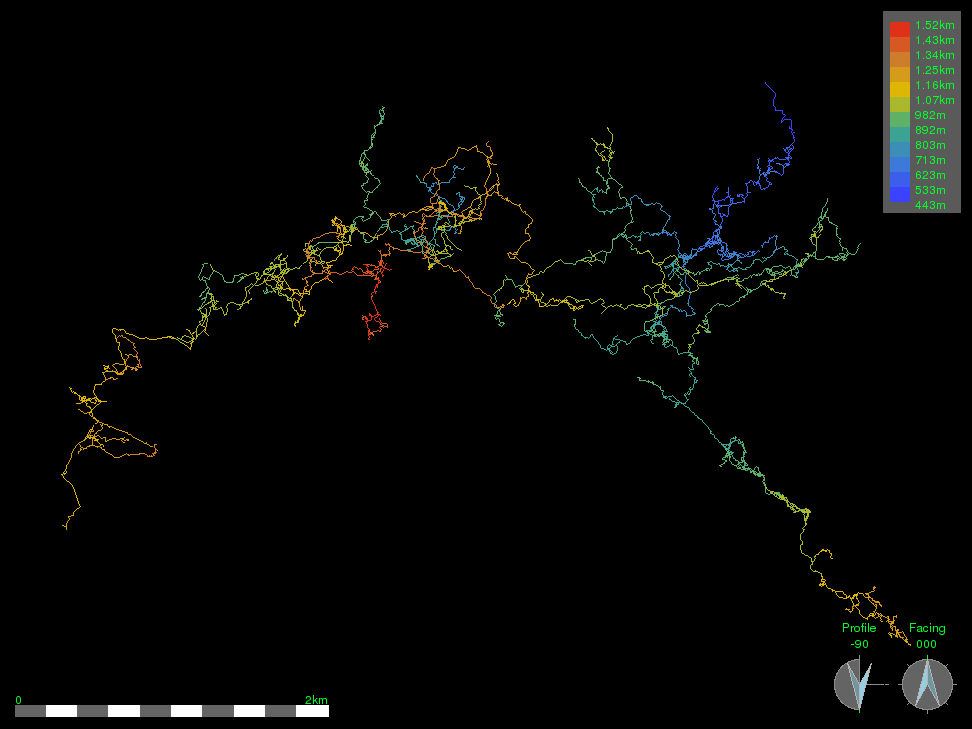
Polygon plan of the cave, blue = low places, red = high places (November 2010)

It is still ongoing in the Hirlatzhöhle. The exploration is coordinated by the Hallstatt-Obertraun Cave Association. The cave is closed all year round. To avoid a collapse, a blast was carried out during an inspection. Step aids, footbridges and ladders make it easier for exploration teams to proceed through the cave. Visits are only possible in the months from January to March, at other times of the year the water level in some parts of the cave can fluctuate rapidly and leads to flooding.

A great success was achieved through the merger with the What u Got Pot (formerly Schmeltwasserhöhle, cave registry no. 1543/173). This shaft cave was explored and documented up to a length of 7,191 m by British explorers between 2007 and 2018. A horizontal system was approached 830 meters below the entrance, from where it was possible to climb through to the Hirlatzhöhle on September 6, 2018. Further exploration can be expected in this area in the future.

A significant increase in length arose from the merger of the Upper Brandgrabenhöhle (cave registry no. 1546/6) with the Hirlatzhöhle on December 28, 2011, by the cave diver Gerhard Wimmer. The length of the Hirlatzhöhle exceeded the 100 km mark for the first time at 100,068 m. The known depth at this time was 1,073 m.

An obstacle to further exploration inside the cave is a huge vent called Dark Star, which has already been explored at a height of more than 270 meters and reaches even further up, but requires climbing up through loose rock. There was hope of finding a connection further up to a still largely unexplored cave area called Wadiland. The Wadiland, in which a large tunnel with an estimated width of at least 80 meters has already been discovered, can otherwise only be reached via a 200 meter long siphon, which cannot be bypassed. Dives, on the other hand, are difficult to organize because the equipment has to be transported into the cave interior over numerous narrow passages, it takes several days.

In January 2005, Ulrich Meyer immersed himself in two siphons in the east of the Hirlatzhöhle. The dive at a distance of 11,500 m from the cave entrance is the world's first.

== Nature conservation ==
In Austria, caves are in principle (ex-lege) under strict nature conservation. This cave also became the Naturdenkmal (nd600 (number in the nature conservation book of the state of Upper Austria), Hallstatt and Obertraun) explained. The area is located in the core zone of the UNESCO World Heritage area Cultural Landscape Hallstatt–Dachstein/Salzkammergut (WHS 806) and in Europe- and Nature reserve Dachstein (Bird sanctuary and FFH area, AT3101000/EU02; N098).

== Incidents ==
On February 28, 2016, 54-year-old cave explorer Stefan D. from Germany, a member of a five-member group of German and Czech researchers, suddenly collapsed in the cave 2 km from the entrance. Two men got out and were able to alert the Hallstatt mountain rescue service at 7:30 a.m. The doctor visited the victim at 1 p.m. and diagnosed him as dead and already experiencing rigor mortis. The body was brought to the surface on the same day by the Austrian cave rescue team.

== See also ==
- List of deepest caves
- List of longest caves

== Literature ==
- ARGE Hirlatzhöhlendocumentation (ed.): The Hirlatzhöhle in the Dachstein. CD-Rom, Henndorf 2001, ISBN 3-9500833-1-6.
- Gottfried Buchegger, Walter Greger (Red.): The Hirlatzhöhle in the Dachstein, ARGE Hirlatzhöhlenbuch, Hallstatt 1998, ISBN 3-9500833-0-8, (pdf).
- Michael Meyberg, Bettina Rinne: Diving in the Hirlatzhöhle. The Hirlatzhöhle in the Dachstein, editors G. Buchegger and W. Greger, PYTHEAS Verlag Budapest, Hallstatt 1998.

Research, chronological

- Peter Seethaler: Research in the "west" of the Hirlatzhöhle from 2007 to 2011. In: Cave knowledge club information of the Hallstatt-Obertraun Cave Science Association, volume 27, Obertraun 2011, pp. 10–14 (pdf, land-oberoesterreich.gv.at). – Cover photo by Jeff Wade: The “Dark Star vent” in the “Sahara”
- Pavel Riha: Through the cauldron into the Hirlatzhöhle. In: Höhlenkundliche Vereinsinformation, volume 26, Obertraun 2006, pp. 7–9 (pdf, land-oberoesterreich.gv.at).
- Anton Achleitner: Micro-hairdryer effects in the Hirlatzhöhle. In: Höhlenkundliche Vereinsinformation, volume 25, Obertraun 2004, pp. 23–27 (pdf, land-oberoesterreich.gv.at).
- Peter Hübner: Foray into Wadiland, Speleological Association Information, volume 22, Hallstatt 2000, pp. 43–47.
