= Boybuloq =

Cave in Uzbekistan

- Boy-Bulok, Boj-Bulok
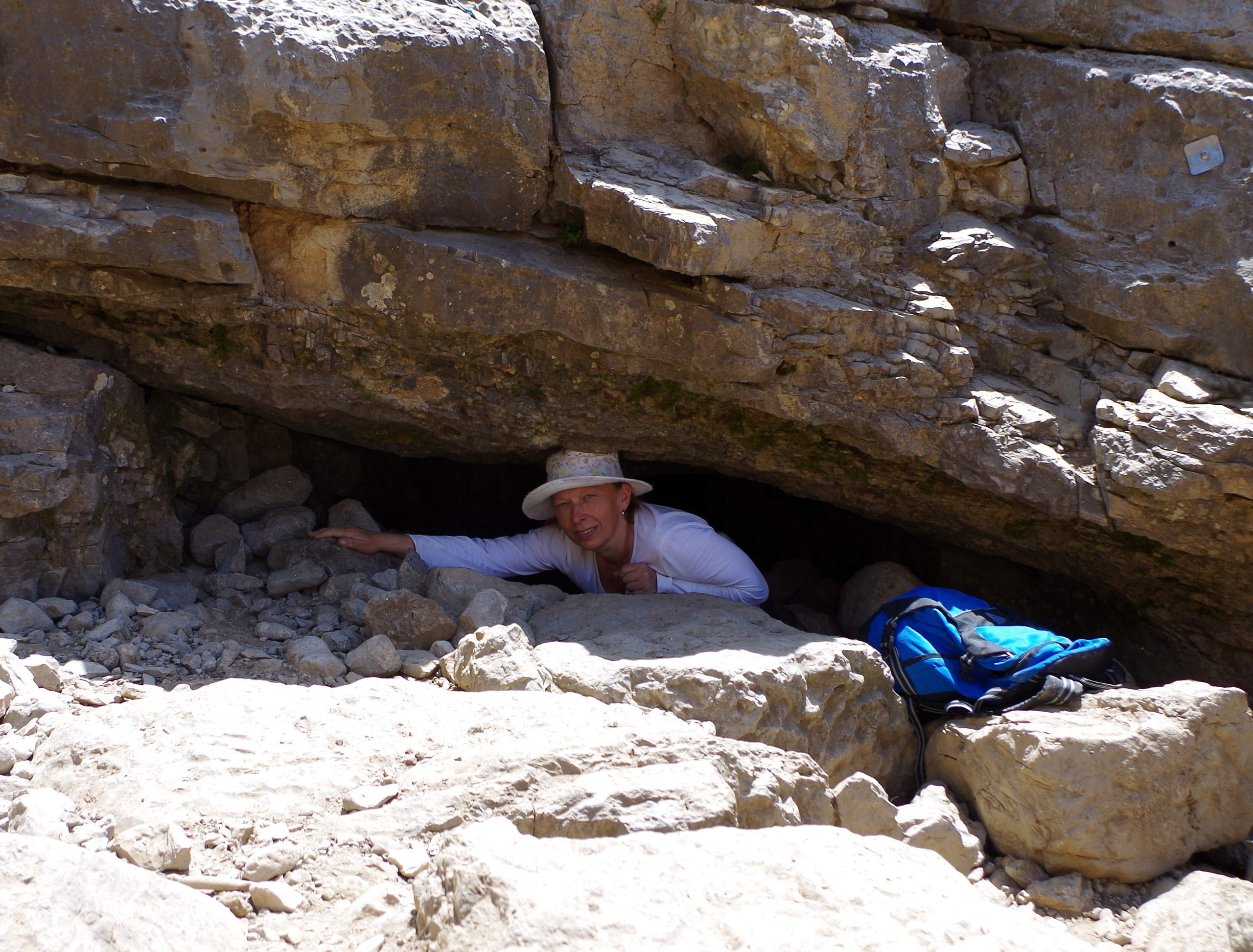
- Cave entrance

- Location within Uzbekistan
- Location: Dehibolo, Uzbekistan
- Coordinates: 38.384470°N 67.501690°E
- Depth: 1,523 metres (4,997 ft)
- Length: 19,900 metres (65,300 ft)
- Elevation: 2,647 metres (8,684 ft)
- Geology: Jurassic limestone
- Entrances: 2

Boybuloq (also known as Boy-Bulok and Boj-Bulok, (Note: For greater accuracy Cyrillic names in this article are romanized according to Scientific transliteration of Cyrillic.) Uzbek: Boybuloq, Russian: Бой-Булок) is a limestone cave in Uzbekistan, the deepest cave in Central Asia and all Asia except its western part. The cave is 1,523 metres (4,997 ft) deep and 19,900 metres (65,300 ft) long with the main entrance at an elevation of 2,647 metres (8,684 ft) above sea level. It is situated at the edge of Baisuntau mountain ridge, the southern spur of the Gissar Range, in the southeast of the country. The nearest village is Dehibolo (Дюйбало in Russian), to the northeast of Boysun.

The cave developed in the covered karst of Upper and Middle Jurassic limestones, in monoclinal strata, in the preserved wing of an anticline. The thickness of limestone strata is 200–350 meters. Contrary to most limestone caves, it was not formed by water precipitation penetrating from the surface, but, as the soluble rock is covered by insoluble strata, by condensation. Hence the cave consists mainly of very narrow passages which descend along the incident angle of strata, from time to time interrupted by vertical shafts, no deeper than 30 metres (98 ft), and ends with an impassable siphon.

It was explored by Russian cavers since 1984, in the framework of Ekaterinburg Speleo Club (SGS) and the Assoсiation of Speleologists of the Urals (ASU), with the participation of cavers from Italy, Great Britain, Slovakia, France, and Switzerland (in chronological order).

== Naming ==
After a period of rain—a rarity in an otherwise very arid mountain climate—a small stream began flowing from the cave's entrance. This phenomenon was referred to as boybuloq, a fusion of the words boy and buloq, meaning "rich spring" in the Uzbek and Tajik languages.

== Early history ==
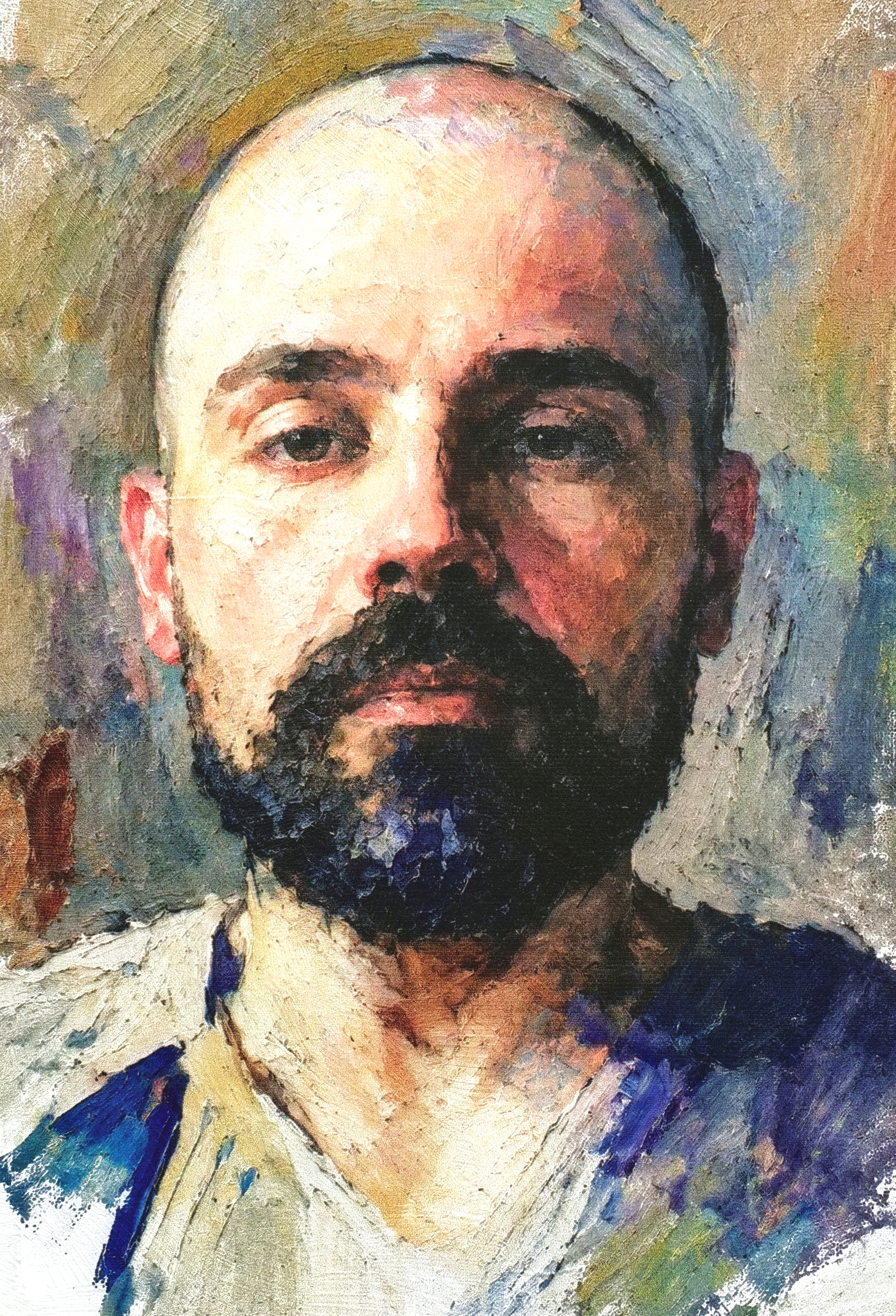
The first explorer

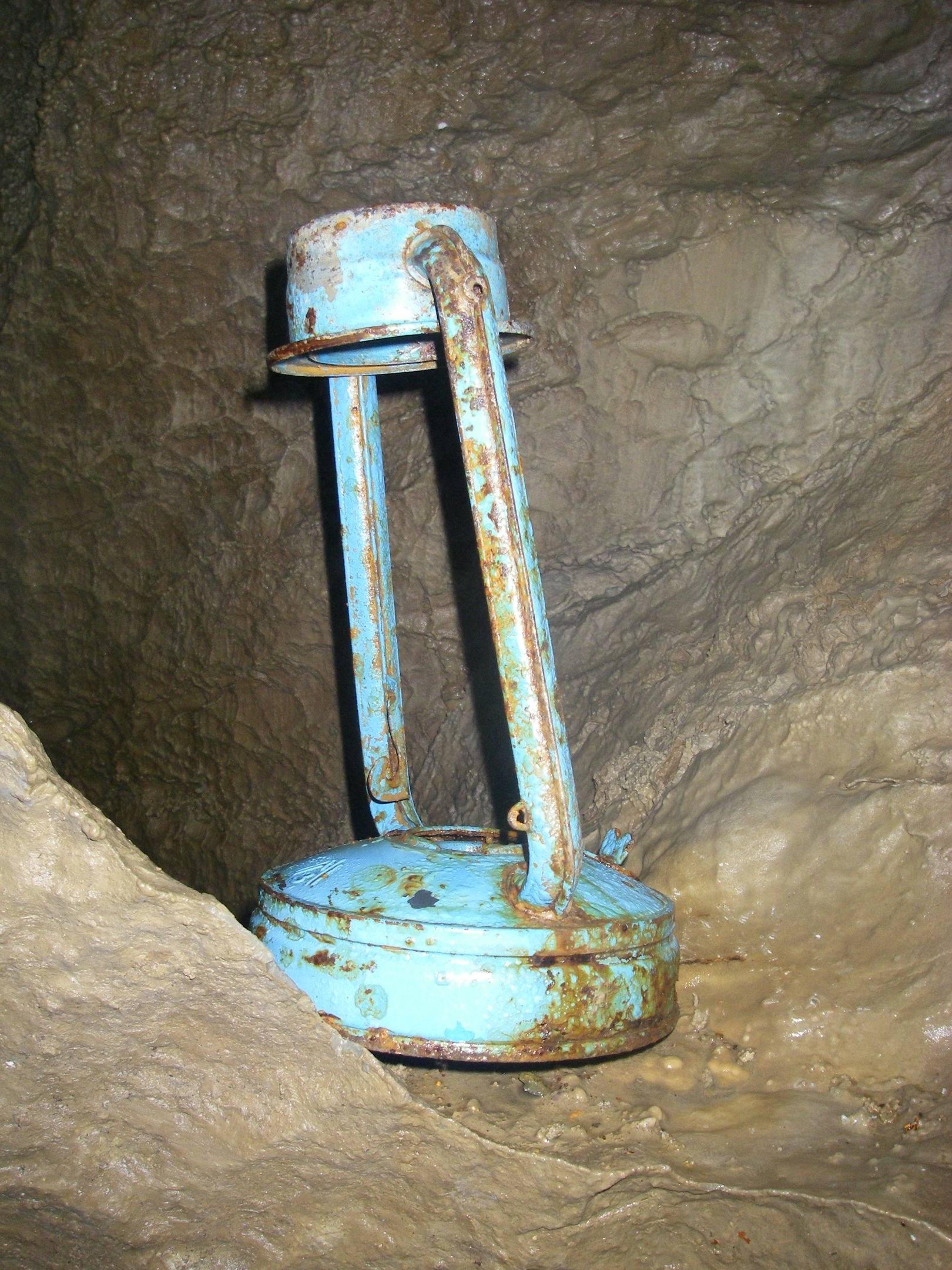
The lamp of Mustafo

The cave was known to local people since ancient times, because from its entrance a stream of water flows down the slope of the otherwise-very-arid mountain landscape. In the winter, the village Dehibolo, at an elevation of 1,750 metres (5,740 ft) (whose name translates to "the highest village"), is cut off by the snow; later in the summer the few springs, which provide water to residents, can dry up. In May 1970 Mustafo Zokirovič Holmominov (born 1917), a farmer from Dehibolo, departed on a 4-hour trek to the cave (8 km) with his son Hudojberdi (born 1955) on three donkeys. The cave was known to him; he had visited it several times before. The two reached the cave and Mustafo went into the cave to pray. After a crawl of about one hour, he reached a point close to the first shaft, where his kerosene lamp went out. In the darkness he missed the direction towards the entrance, and fell to his death into the abyss. Hudojberdi waited at the entrance for two days until the villagers from Dehibolo came and returned him home by force.

Young men from Dehibolo tried to find Mustafo in the cave on several occasions that summer and in the following years but to no avail. His remains were not discovered until 1985, during the first speleological exploration of the cave.

== Exploration ==
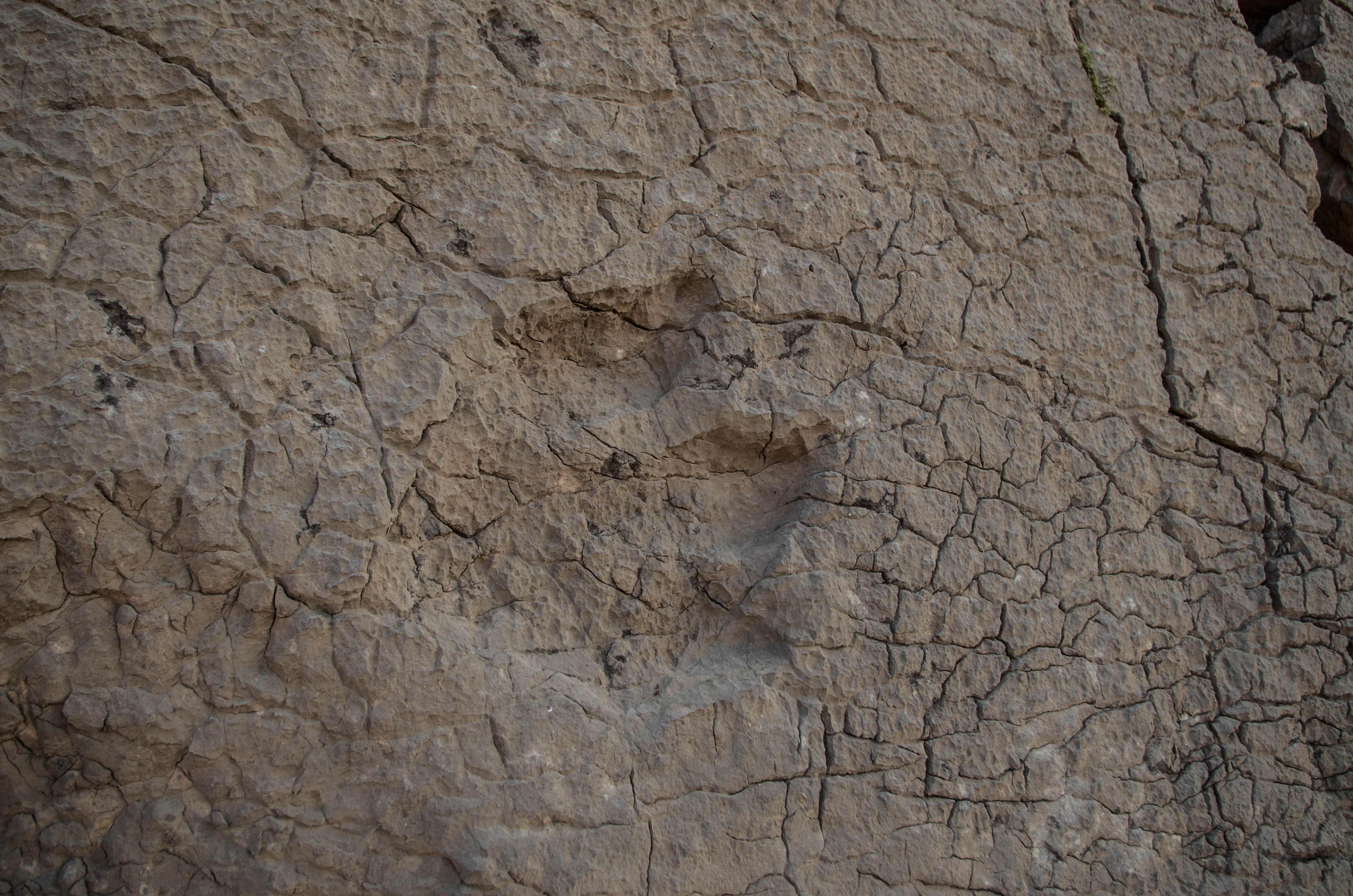
40×40 cm fossilized dinosaur footprint in the canyon which leads to Boybuloq

After the discovery of Kiev Cave on the Kirk Tau plateau in Uzbekistan in 1972, 2340 m a. s. l., which was in the subsequent years explored to the depth of 990 m and was in the years 1977–1978 the deepest-known cave in the USSR, Russian speleologists from Yekaterinburg (SGS) in the late 1970s and early 1980s started to search for new deep caves in the wider area of the country. In May 1981 they discovered the Zindan cave (later renamed to Urals-Zenkov cave), 3100 m a. s. l., in the Ketmen'-Čapta ridge. Its spring at the elevation of 1300 m indicated the possibility of a very deep cave. In January 1983, the final depth of 565 m was reached, in a siphon too narrow to dive. Several expeditions in the summer 1983 were fruitless, while in 1984 a token SGS expedition to Hodja-Gur-Gur-Ata massif discovered a number of promising entrances.

During a larger expedition in 1985, a group of five expedition members was sent to Surkhan-Tau ridge to scout its surface for new caves. On the way, in the village Kurgancha, 1455 m a. s. l., they were told of a cave higher in the mountain, called Boybuloq, into which a villager from the highest settlement in Uzbekistan, the village Dehibolo, went in 1970 and never returned. They followed the stream bed and discovered the low cave entrance, at an elevation of 2647 m. The cave began with 7 meters of a crawl in liquid mud, with scattered stone supports, after which it was possible to stand up. A high-but-narrow meander followed, it slowly ascended for 600 meters in straight direction, to a height of 90 meters, where it turned down. Soon a 27-meter pit was reached and they discovered human bones at its bottom. They belonged to Mustafo Zokirovič Holmominov.

Boybuloq and most other caves in the area are a long sequence of tight passages which are difficult to pass, and where possibilities for help or rescue operations are very limited, as described by Sergej Kuklev, a member of the SGS team:

I asked Ilija, trying to speak as calmly as possible, how, in his opinion, would it be more convenient to get through the tight meander, top or bottom? After some thinking he responded that the bottom choice would undoubtedly be more convenient. And so, I, flattened like a flounder, climbed in a hole under the rocks, barely wide enough for my head. And got stuck, of course. The caving suit, torn in all possible places, didn't let go, so I had to stop to take a breath ... Only God or his/her own might can help a person which got stuck in Boybuloq – two people together just do not fit in a tight corridor. On one of previous expeditions it happened that a caver fell off a rope in a pit and, flying 17 meters, broke both legs. All we could do was to have painkillers ready at all times. It took him two days to crawl out of the cave on his own ...

Boybuloq cave profile with surface NW-SE, as seen from the SW

In the following years further expeditions took place: in 1986 the cave was deepened to −400 m, in 1987 to −500 m and the remains of Zokirov were returned to his family, in 1988 a siphon at −600 m was free-dived and also the barrier on the other side lowered so that the lake could be waded through, and a new branch of the cave was discovered – it continued to −900 m. In 1989 a combined Soviet-Italian team reached the terminal siphon at −1158 m, and managed to climb upwards to the point at an elevation of +156 m which gave the total cave depth of 1310 m. In 1990 a Soviet-British team managed to extend the New branch in the cave upwards to +222 m (total depth 1376 m). As can be seen from the above map, this international participation in discoveries was reflected in the naming of three substantial cave sections: the Italian, English, and Russian tunnels.

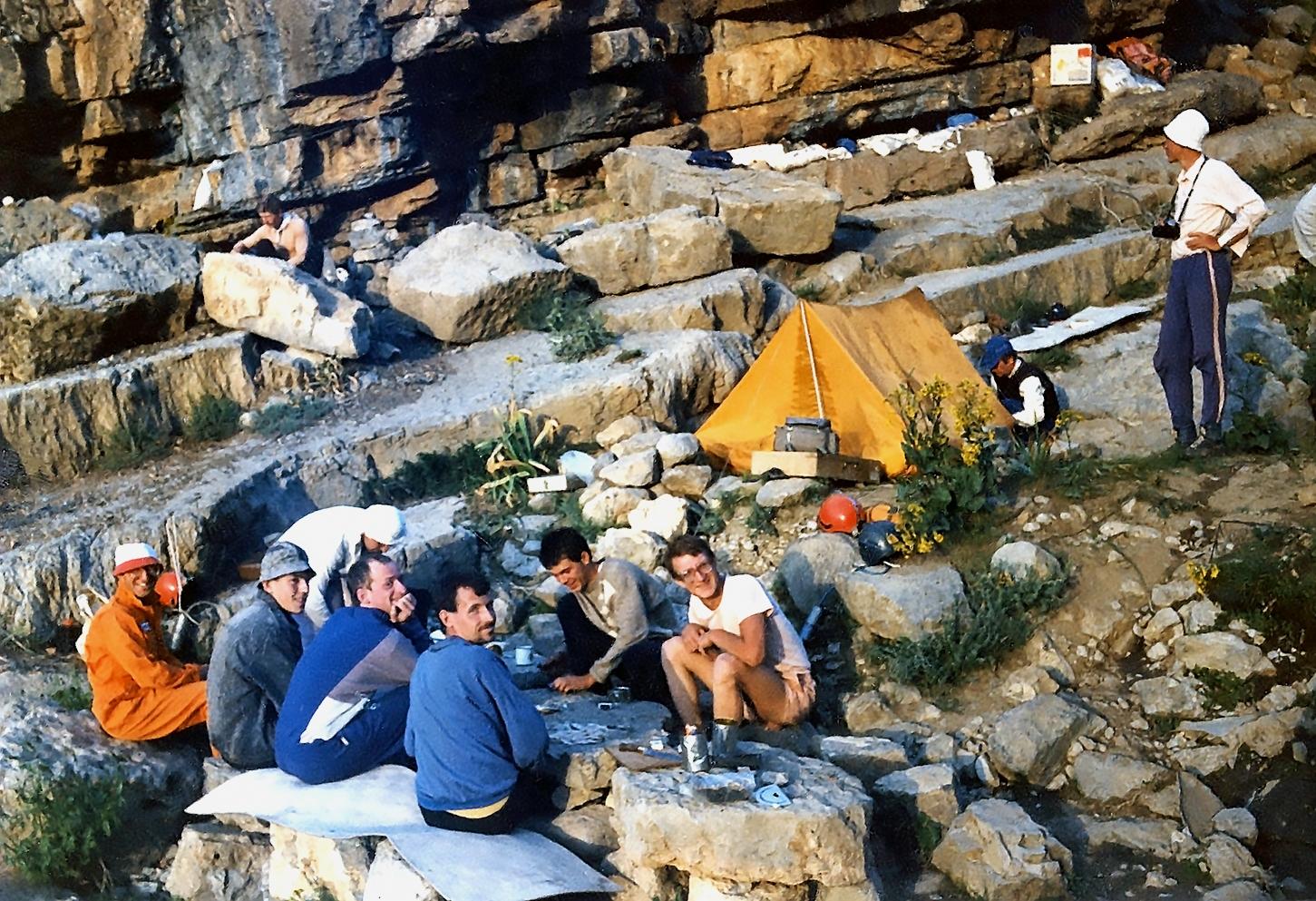
1992 Boybuloq expedition camp

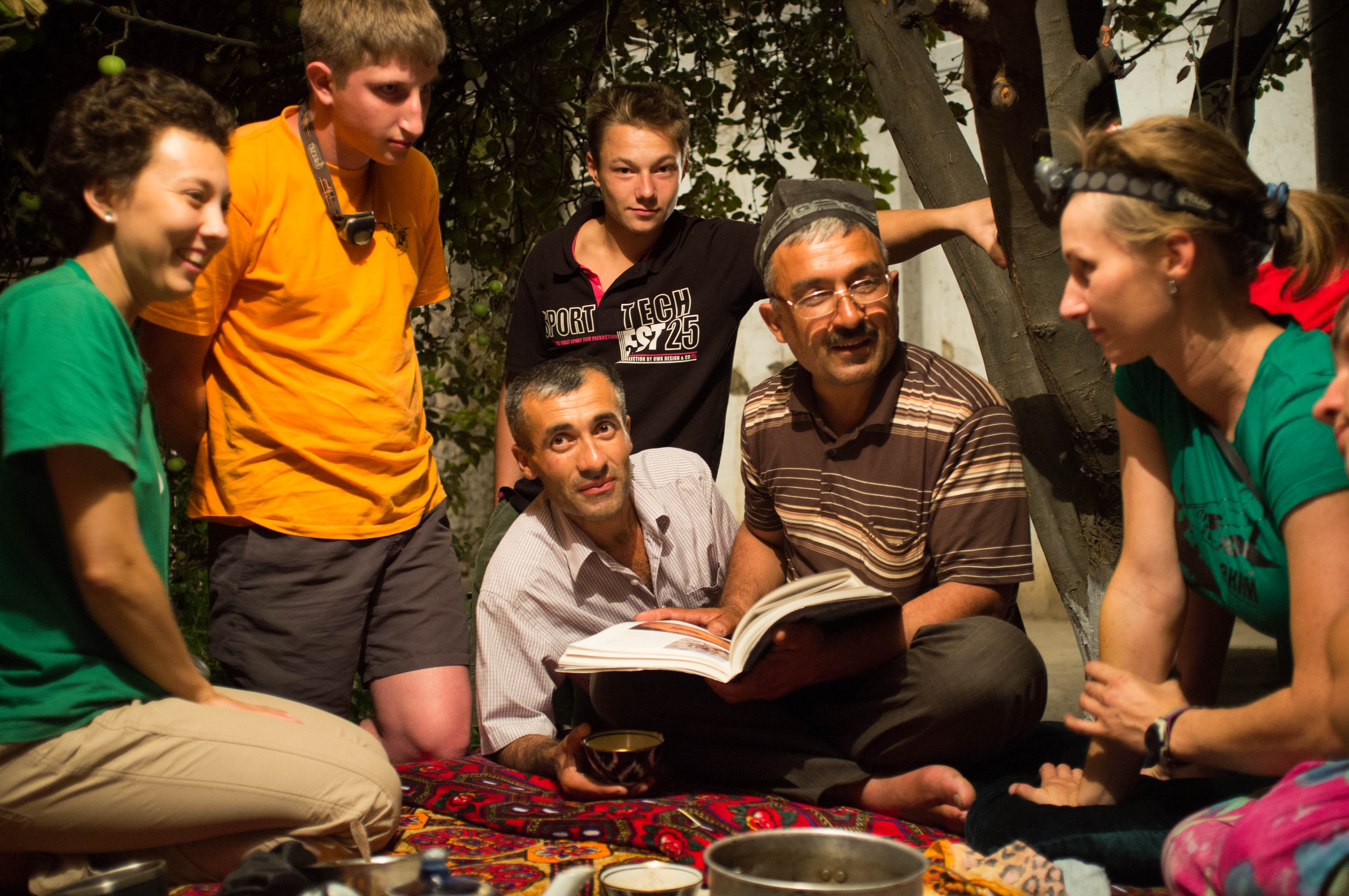
Expedition members around Sadyk Džuraev from Dehibolo, 2013

In 1991 lower levels of the New branch were discovered, and in 1992 an additional chimney upwards was climbed to +257 m, which gave the final cave depth of 1415 m. In 1995 a major collapse in the cave was dug through, in 1998 the diving of the siphon at −560 m was unsuccessful, and the spring Holtan-Čašma, where the water from the terminal cave siphon comes to light, was also dived. The spring is situated 130 m below the terminal cave siphon while the horizontal distance is 7 km, so the connecting passages are most likely submerged. In the next years the turmoil which followed the dissolution of the Soviet Union was unfavorable for caving expeditions and SGS cavers returned to Uzbekistan only in 2007, to Boybuloq, and expeditions followed almost every year. New passages in Boybuloq were discovered and explored, yet the cave depth remained the same. Diving in the Holtan-Čašma spring was resumed in 2014, 2015 and 2016, when, at a horizontal distance of 170 m and depth of 18 m, a lenticular grotto was reached with narrow, downward-extending slots, too narrow to pass.

During the 2021 SGS and ASU expedition, a survey team mapped the upwards-extending tunnels in the New branch of the cave, explored in 2016. Survey data showed that the highest point achieved, where the tunnel narrows into an as-yet impassable hole with very strong air current, is situated 272 m above the cave entrance. Boybuloq's amplitude changed from 1415 m, achieved in 1992, to 1430 m, and its length increased to 15,212 m.

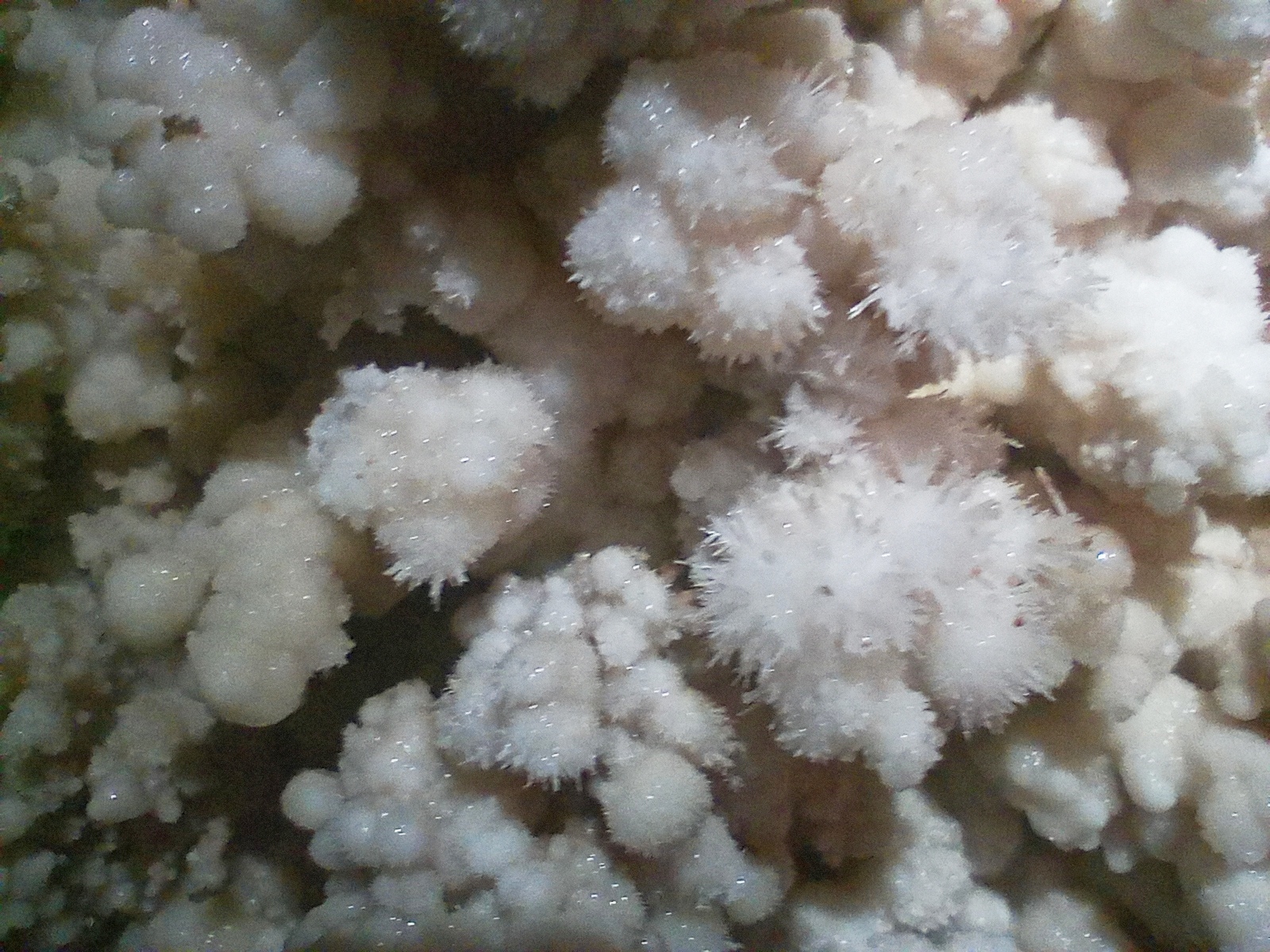
Limestone crystals above Camp Zero

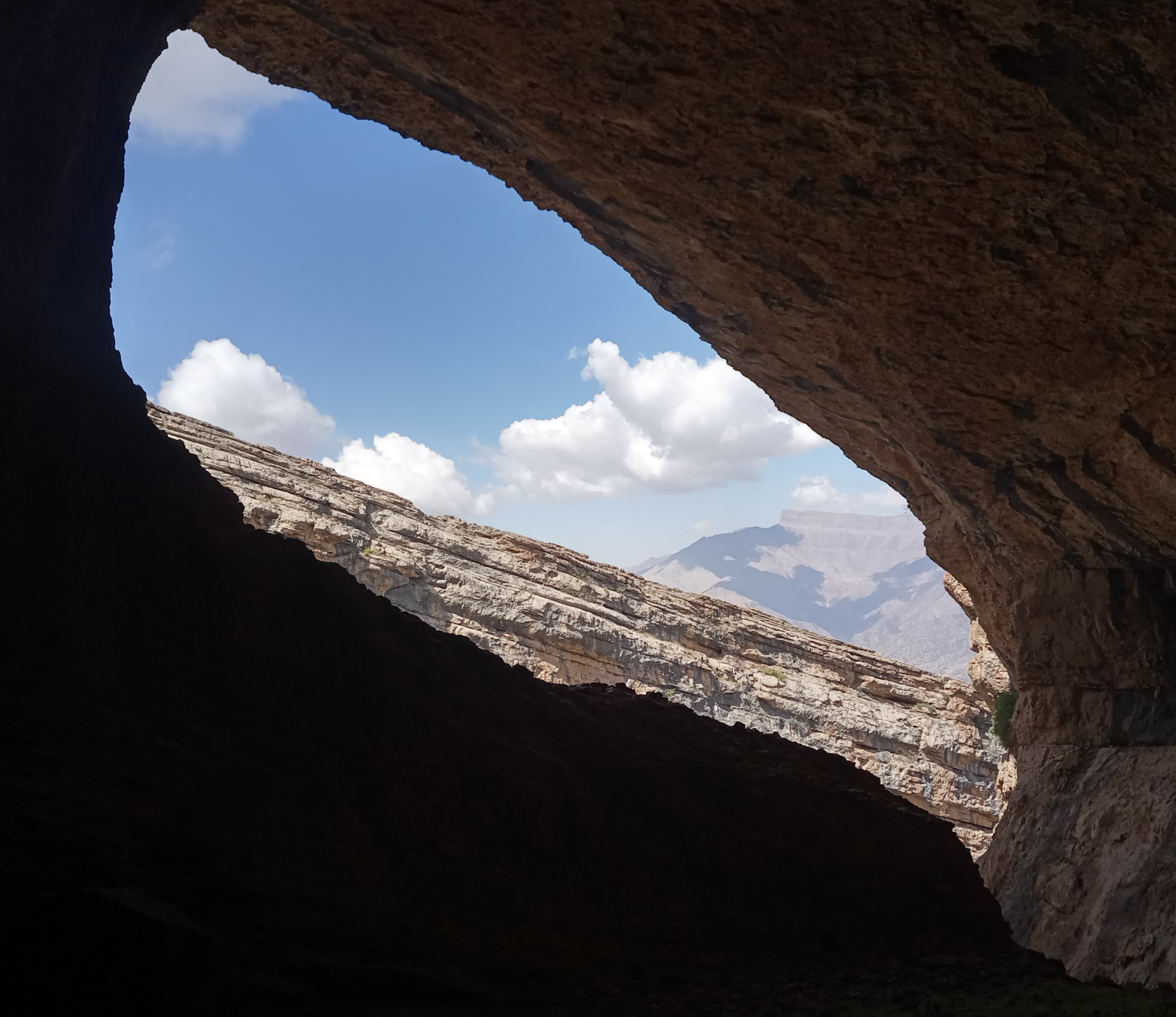
Grotto in a canyon above Boybuloq

In 2022 a 20-member Russian expedition called Boybuloq 2022 took place in August, again organized in the framework of SGS and ASU, led by Vadim Loginov. It only operated in Boybuloq. The base camp was established at 2770 m a. s. l., 120 meters above the cave. The only goal was to explore any possibility of connecting the cave to Višnevskij. There were four working groups. The diving group of two explored three siphons. Two were too narrow to pass, while they successfully dived through the third. Upstream, a large tunnel followed; one of the two divers explored a short distance and returned. Exploration of this part of the cave was postponed, since a lot of equipment is required for climbing after the siphons. The scouting group, also of two, checked the side tunnels and meanders in the vicinity. They found several smaller tunnels, which all ended in narrows. No draught in the direction of Višnevskij was found. The climbing group, again of two, explored the upper floors of the cave. They discovered several closed loops, of a chimney which led to a horizontal tunnel, ending with a pit that brought them down into the already-known part of the cave. At the end of expedition they climbed a 170-meter-high chimney, wide enough, which continued with a tunnel, presumably leading in the direction of the Višnevskij cave. Due to the lack of time they returned. The mining team of four was widening the narrows in the projected direction to Višnevskij cave. They advanced around 20 meters; there was no draught to follow. The cave depth did not change; around 1 km of new tunnels were explored; no survey was made.

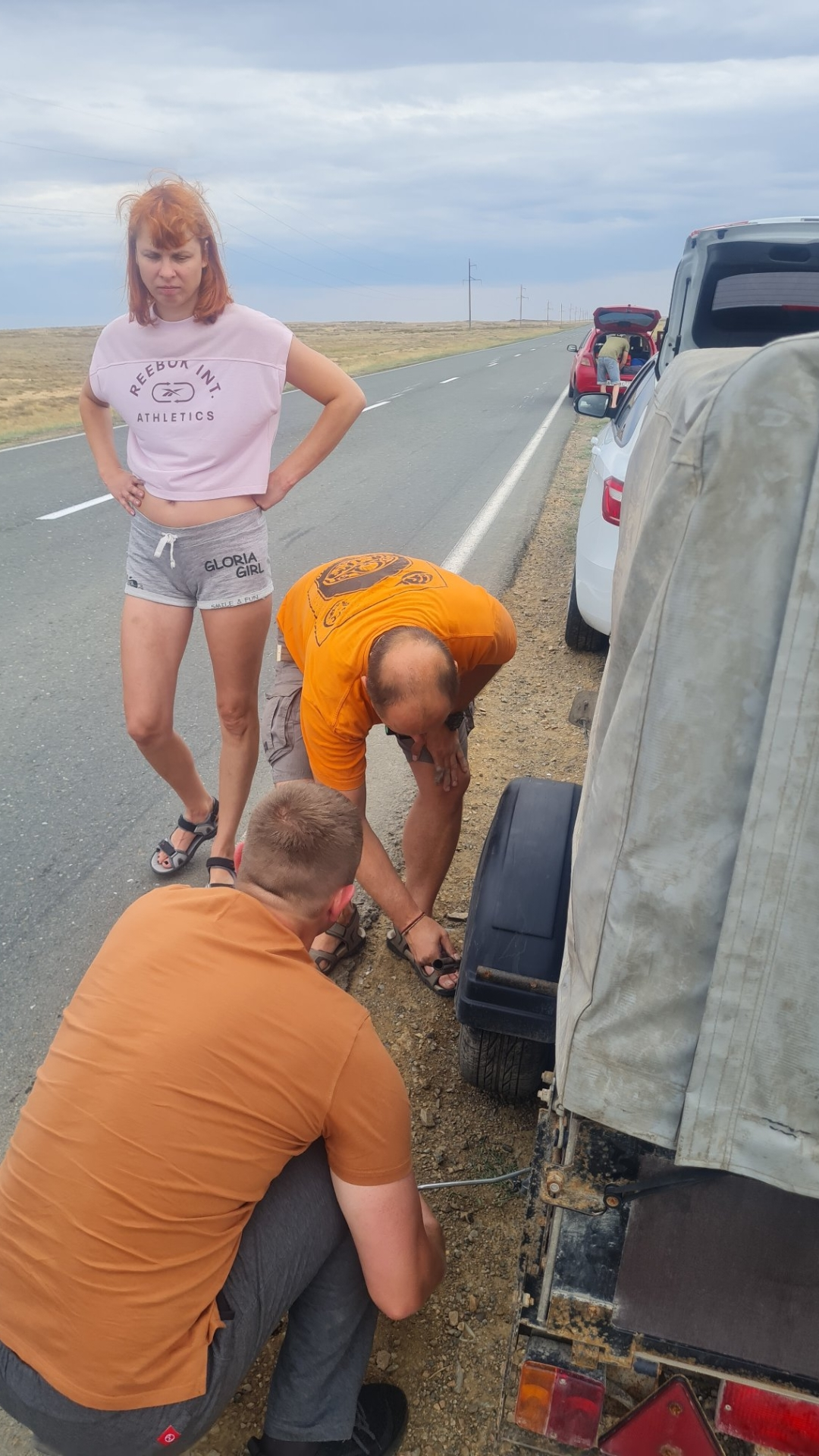
Flat tire on the road across Kazakhstan

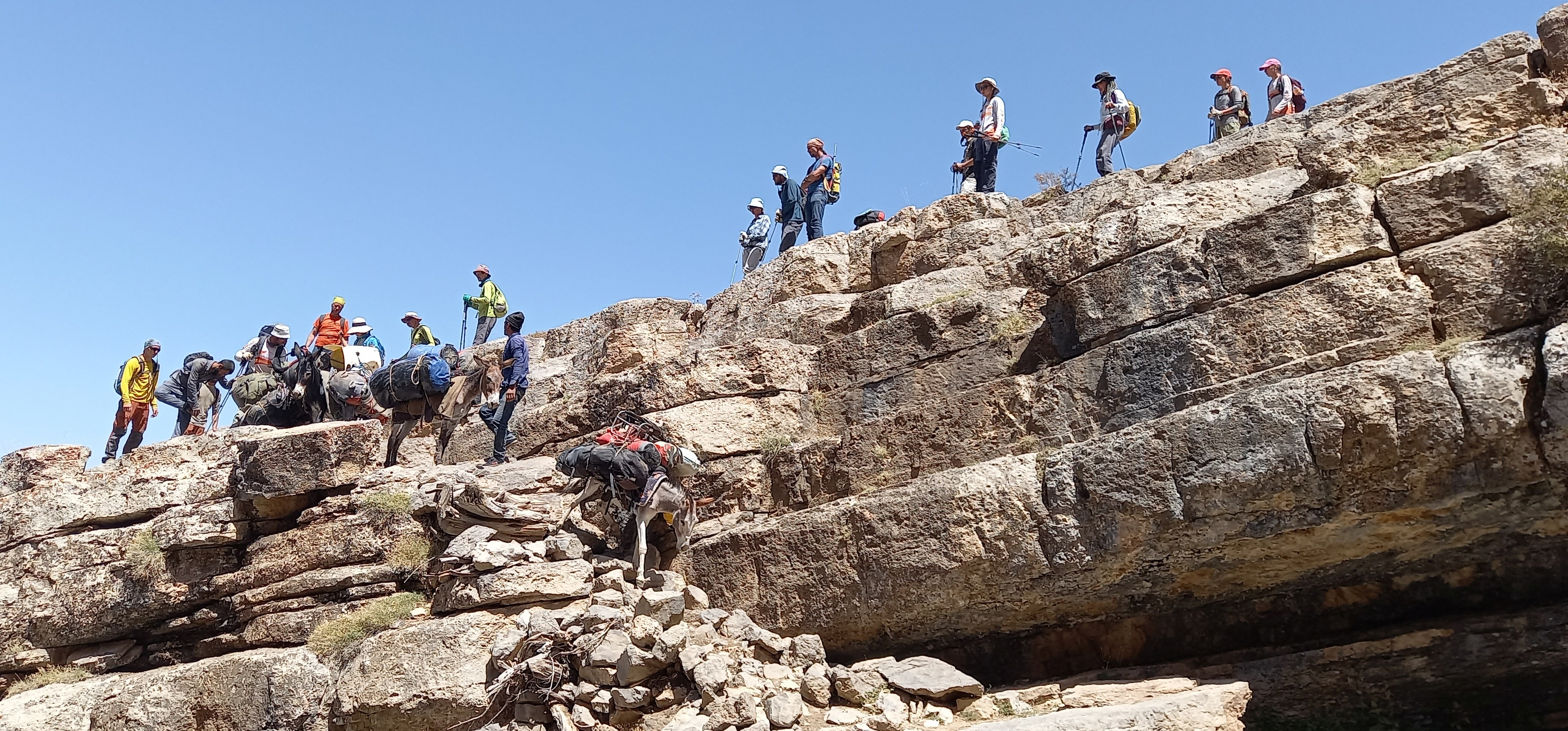
Descent into the Boybuloq canyon, below the cave entrance

In 2023 a large, 33-member expedition, Russian with one participant from Taiwan and one from the Czech Republic, worked in August, in the same arrangement as in 2022. This year they operated in both caves, Boybuloq and Višnevskij. In Boybuloq the mining group worked at the closest point to Višnevskij, advancing 20 meters but finding no draught. The climbing group followed the tunnels and chimneys in the direction of Višnevskij. They discovered several new galleries; on top of the 170-meter chimney, the tunnel continued for 666 meters and ended with a collapse. Speleothem samples were collected in the cave Lunnaja (Moon cave, which runs above the tunnels of Višnevskij cave) to be analysed at the Department of Geosciences, at National Taiwan University. At the top of Boybuloq, in a tunnel 270 m above the cave entrance, a new underground camp was established from which a small group was expanding the narrow passage at the highest point of the cave, with a very strong air draft. They advanced 4 meters. Another group was working from the underground Camp Zero (approximately the same elevation as the Boybuloq entrance). They climbed a few steps and chimneys and in one of them discovered a narrow tunnel which continued upwards in the direction of the top of the Chulbair ridge, to the wall on its eastern side. They passed 1.5 km of the tunnel, and surveyed part of it. On the last day of the expedition they measured the altitude of the last point reached with an altimeter, considerably extending the amplitude of Boybuloq. The tunnel continues, but they had to return due to lack of time. After the expedition, Boybuloq had a new depth of 1517 meters and a length of 18.4 km.

The 11-member SGS and ASU expedition in August 2024, named Boybuloq 2024, the smallest since 2017, did not change the Boybuloq's depth or length but it discovered an important ice cave, Bear cave (Medvežja peščera) at an altitude of 3768 meters above sea level, 246 meters above the entrance to Višnevskij cave. The 35-member expedition in August 2025, one of the largest, also in the framework of SGS and ASU, named Asia 2025 as it also operated in the caves of Hodja-Gur-Gur-Ata ridge, managed to increase the depth slightly, to 1523 meters, going upwards from the point reached in 2023. They also made the survey of cave parts, discovered earlier and during this expedition, to obtain the new cave length of 19900 meters. Expedition worked in both caves, in Boybuloq and Višnevskij. On the last day of the expedition's work in Boybuloq the connection searching team discovered the most promising lead so far, with strong air current, and advanced 50 meters through the meander towards Višnevskij.

== Višnevskij Cave ==
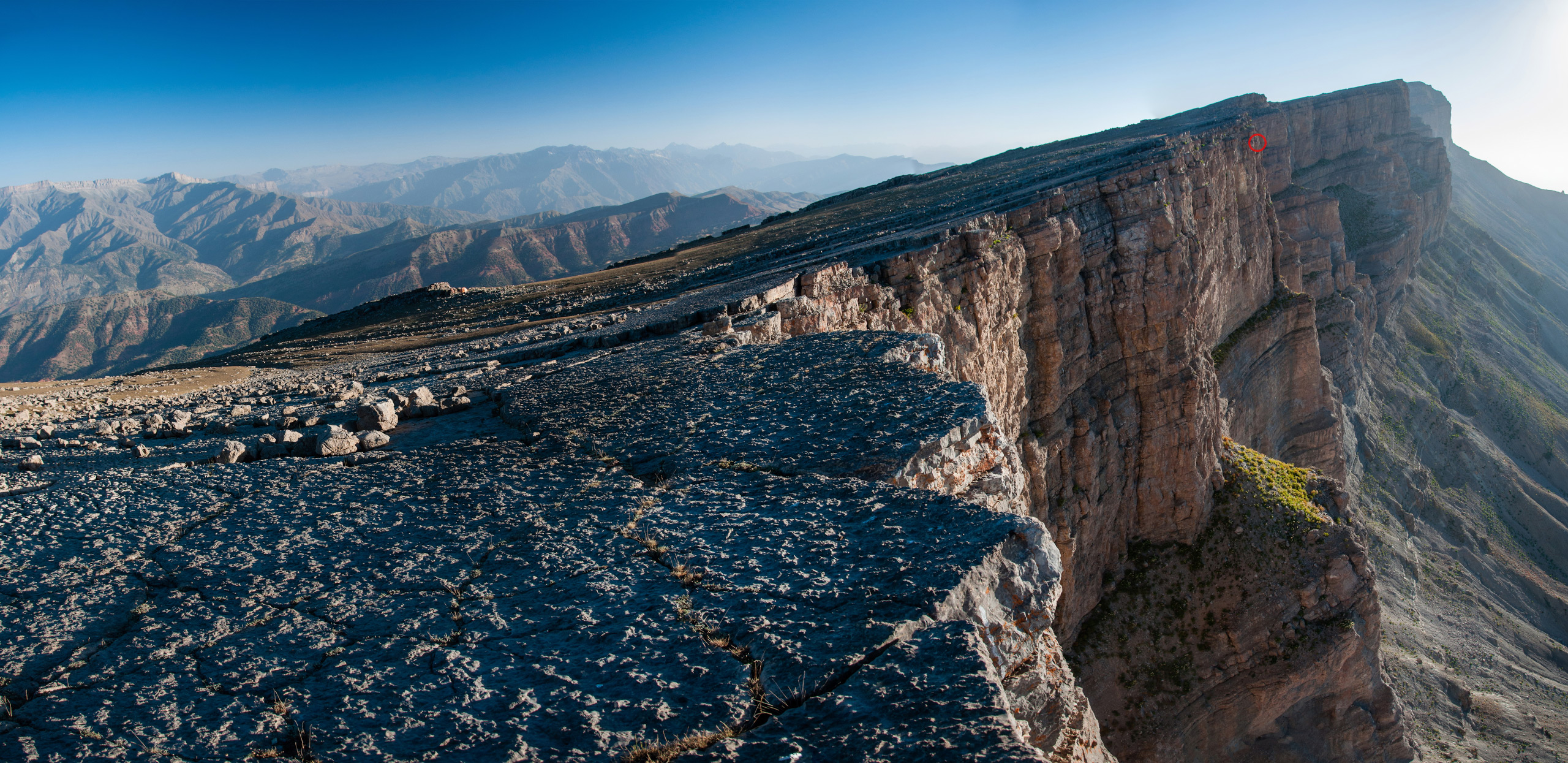
Chul-Bair mountain ridge with marked entrance to the cave, named after Višnevskij

In 2015, the year of the death of Aleksandr Sergeevič Višnevskij, leader of SGS expeditions to Boybuloq from 1988 to 1992 and from 1995 to 2008, a SGS and ASU search team of 7, led by Vasilij Samsonov from Orenburg, methodically examined the 3-km-long section of the 150–200-meter-high wall which forms the edge of the ridge above Boybuloq. They found several possible cave entrances, all located 30–50 m below the crest of the wall. The most promising proved to be the one marked as ČB-15 (Chul-Bair 15), with the coordinates 38.374167°N 67.532778°E. The entrance is an 8-meter-high grotto at an elevation of 3522 m, 25 m below the top of the ridge; access requires a rope descent. It continued with a series of small shafts, connected by narrow meanders. 400 meters far and 70 meters deep, the team stopped at a very narrow passage with strong draught. After 4 hours of work, they broke the through and it continued with a bigger shaft, which they left for the next year.

In 2016, team of 7, 4 Russians and 3 Italians (La Venta speleo club), from the Baysun-Tau 2016 expedition, worked in the cave. Due to long access route from the base camp (3 hours), part of the camp was moved to the top of the ridge. The situation there was complicated by the lack of water, strong wind, and low temperature at night. The team widened the last narrow passage from 2015, descended 15 m into the hall "Martens" which continued with a very narrow but tall meander (3–30 m), followed by an inclined and very slippery meander. It ended with a 40-meter shaft, 4–5 hours crawl from the entrance, at the bottom of which a Camp −168 was later erected. They followed the draught, and after a series of narrow passages, vertical and horizontal, which required widening, descended into a slightly wider meander with a small stream at the bottom. After 300 m, a 12-meter shaft was reached, after which the next meander led, as a tributary, to a wider and higher meander with a larger stream. It ended with a narrow passage which they broke through and reached another 8-meter shaft, where lack of time forced them to return. The surveyed part of the cave was deepened to 234 m and prolonged to 1089 m, with more left unsurveyed. The map showed that the cave, now renamed to Višnevskij cave, steadily descended in the direction of Boybuloq.

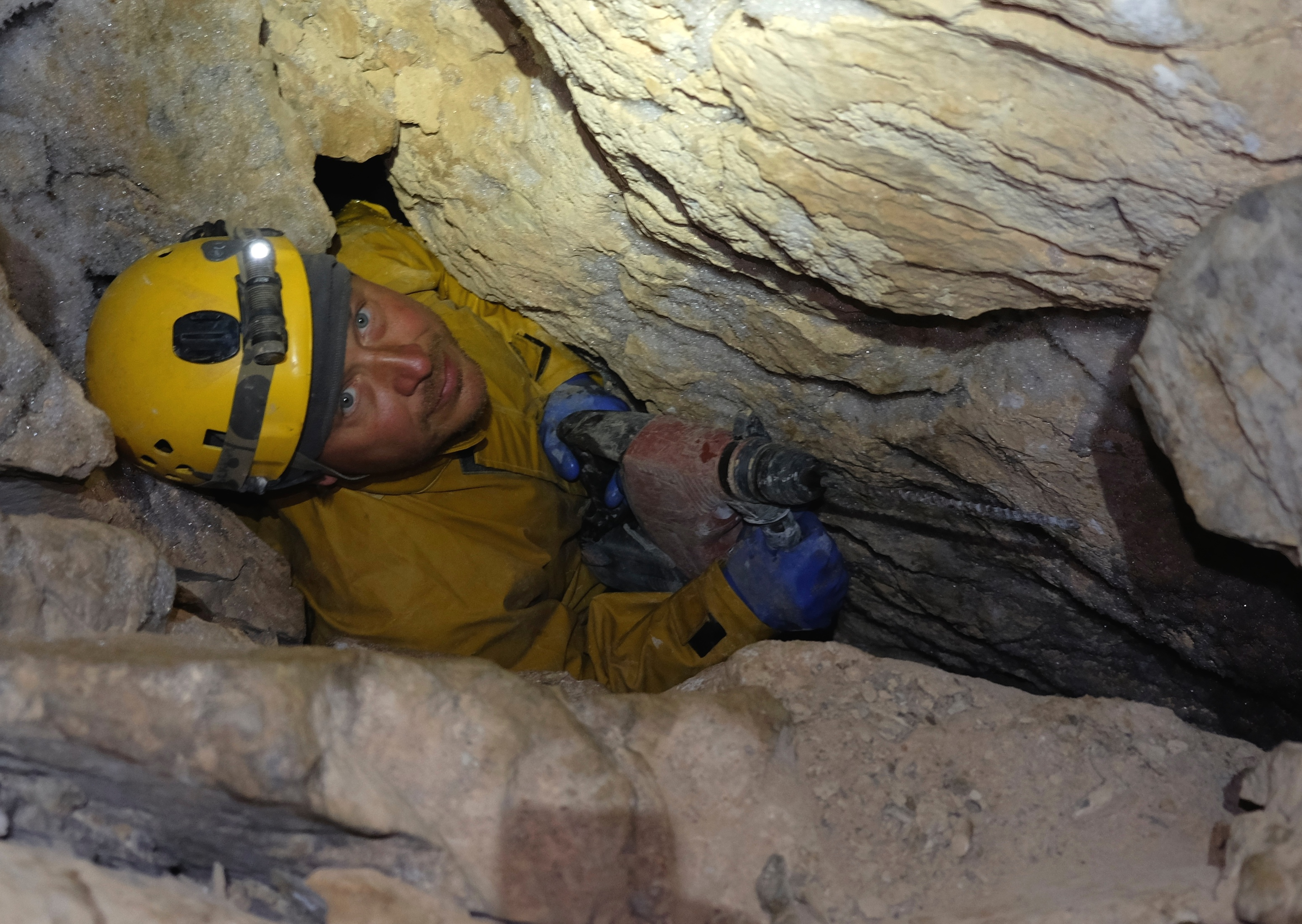
Georgij Sapožnikov is widening a meander in ČB-17, 2017

In 2017, a team of 10, from SGS and ASU, set camp above the cave, 3500 m a. s. l. After a brief acclimatization they set up a tent underground Camp −168 from where Sergej Terehin and Artur Abdjušev pushed their way through the cave till the siphon at −735 m, in a day-and-night non-stop sortie. Another camp, of hammocks, was set up; the new part is a corridor, on average 50 cm wide, with a stream, into which 4 tributaries (unexplored) flow. The survey reached 586 m in depth and 2800 m in length; it showed that the cave descends steadily towards the New branch of Boybuloq, at an angle of 19°, the same as the surface, at a distance from the surface of 70–100 m. A precise survey of the ridge surface was also made, for the construction of the 3D cave model. Part of the team scouted for additional cave entrances on the ridge plateau and along the wall, which would shorten the tiresome and time-consuming crawl to the cave bottom. Several interesting caves were found, such as Lunnaja (Moon cave), U istočnika (At the Source), and Logovo; they also worked in ČB-17, but none connected to Višnevskij cave.

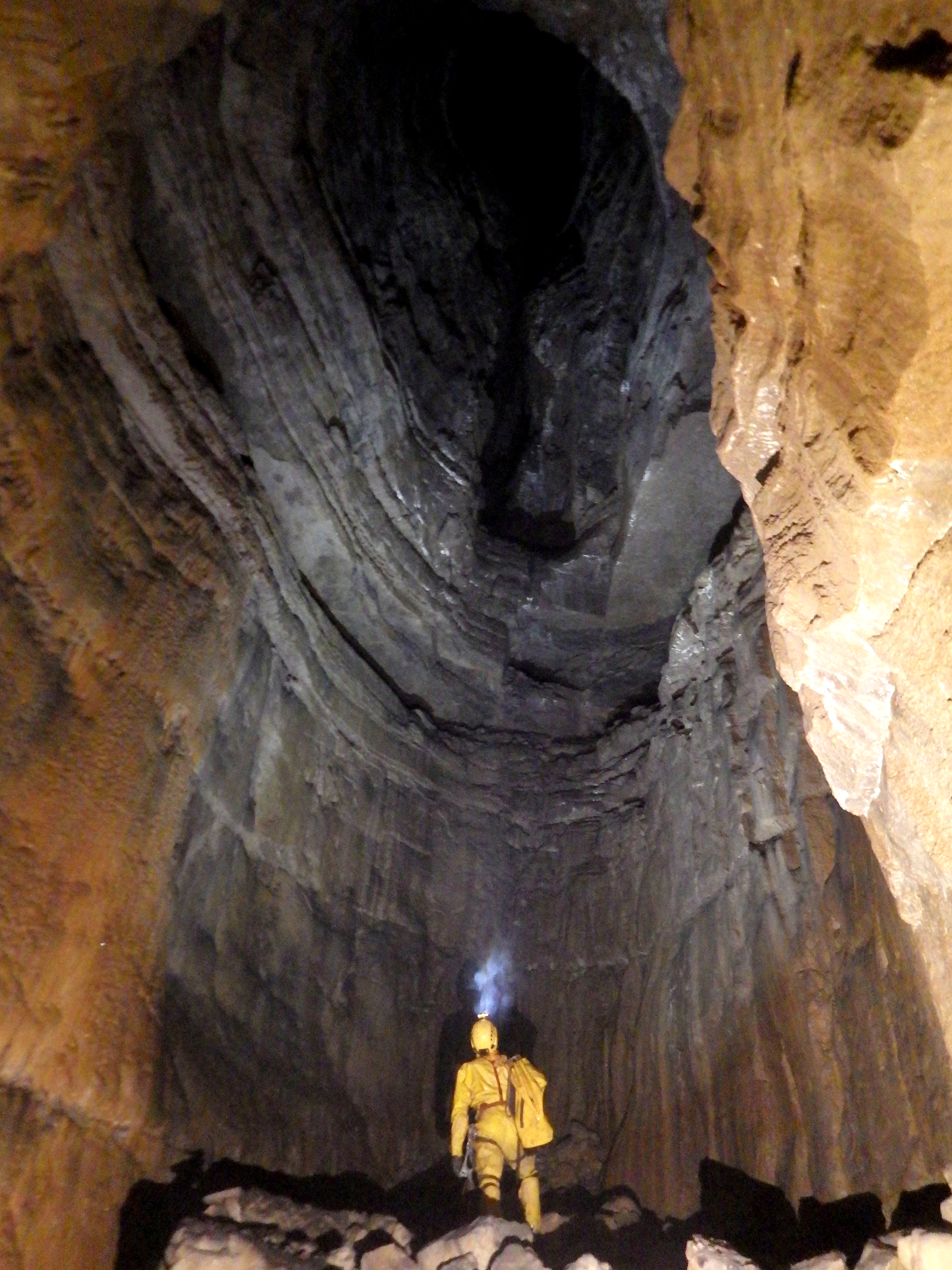
"Lucas Baldo", the shaft at −293

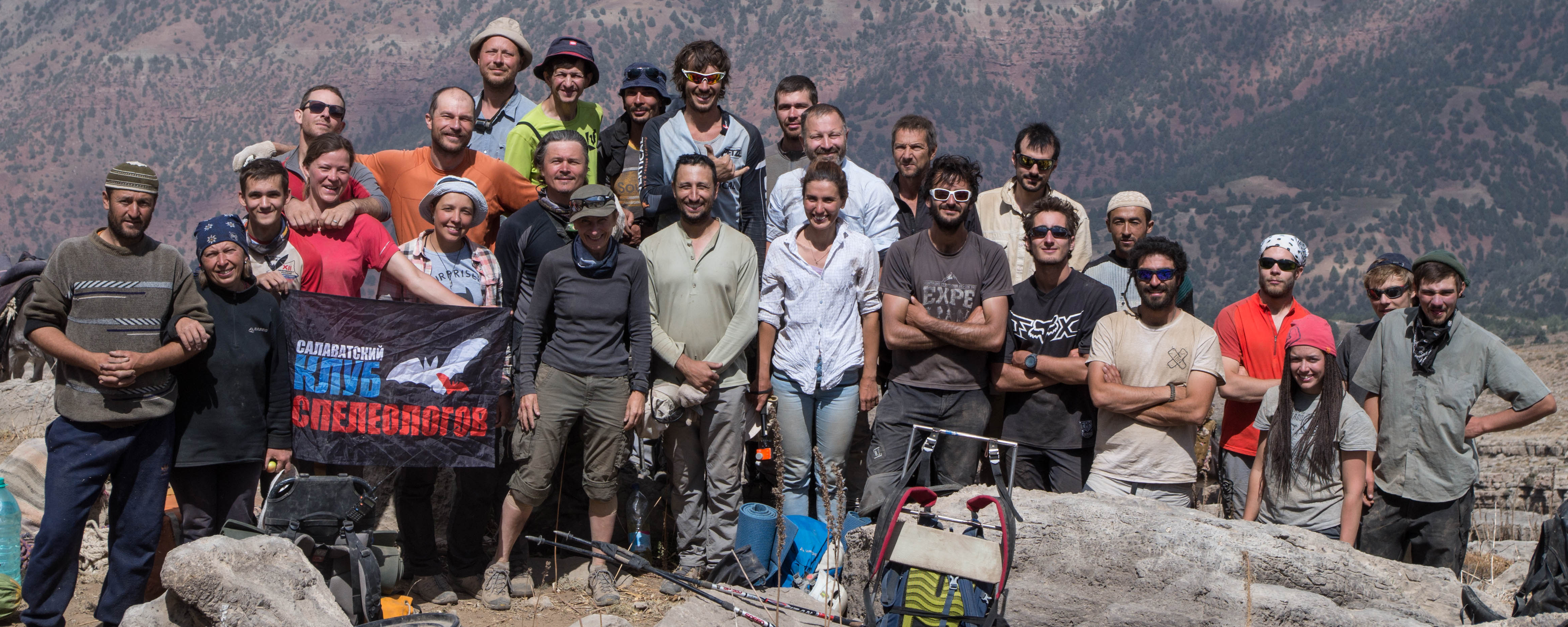
Chul-Bair 2018 expedition team

In 2018, an international team of 25, 14 from SGS and ASU, 8 from France and 3 from Switzerland set off to explore not only Višnevskij cave, but also caves Boybuloq, Lunnaja, and ČB-5. They camped at an altitude of 3000 m, one hour from the entrance to Višnevskij and 1.5 hours from Boybuloq. In the cave two hammock camps were set up, at −350 m and at −600 m. Close to the lower camp, in a side tributary which continued in the opposite (ascending) direction, a small gallery was discovered, a hint of a possible continuation towards Boybuloq. In one of the other two tributaries examined, a large, 90-meter-tall chimney "Lucas Baldo" was found, which gets close (20 m) to the surface. Outside, in the canyon which leads to Boybuloq, dinosaur footprints were discovered, while in the new branch of this cave more a precise survey was made for better location of the connecting point with Višnevskij cave. A siphon bypass was not found, but 2500 m of new tunnels were mapped in Višnevskij and Lunnaja caves.

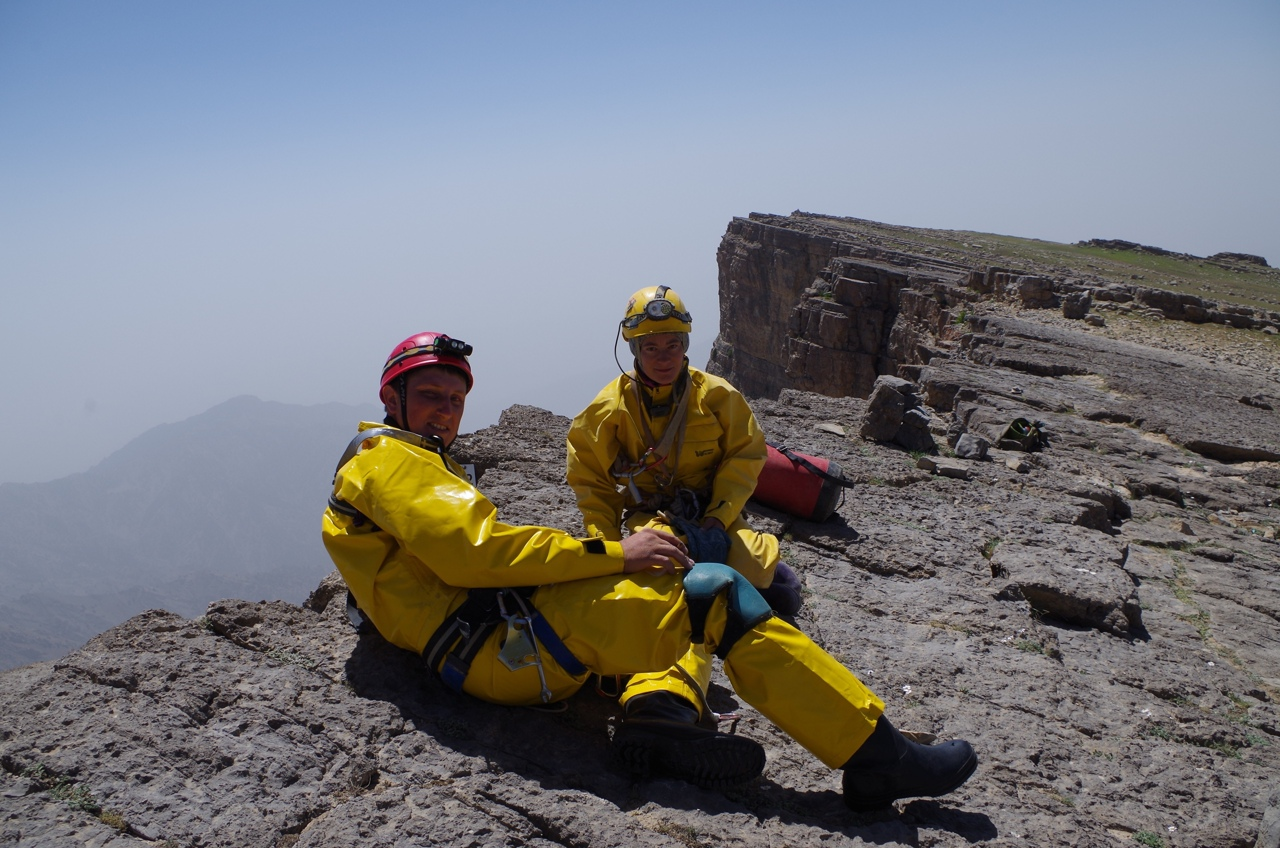
Aleksej Seregin and Ekaterina Bazarova on top of the ridge above the cave entrance, 2019

In 2019, it was difficult to assemble the expedition as there was no clear continuation, especially not around the siphon but, when cavers from Moscow and Irkutsk also joined the SGS and ASU team, a group of 15 gathered. The surface camp was set up in a proven location near Lunnaja cave, and a team of four (Evgenij Sakulin, Petr Kovešnikov, Anastasija Janina and Andrej Minogin) departed to the bottom, to set a Camp Siphon there and to try to find a continuation in the ascending tributary at −600 m. Yet on the very first day at the bottom Evgenij and Anastasija managed to crawl through a narrow, half-flooded passage and reached a meander behind the siphon. The cave continued in the right direction. Other plans were scrapped and the team, reinforced with Evgenij Rybka, Vasilij Samsonov, and Vadim Loginov (there was a phone connection from the camp to the surface), set off to the new part. It was a wide meander with a stream at the bottom and 1–5-meter-deep drops. After a while the stream disappeared below the dripstone floor in a narrow passage, above which the "Big Gallery" began. It was dry, the ceiling gradually lowered, the tunnel turned to a crawl, the solid floor was replaced by clay, and it got wet. This part took 2 hours to cross. The passage was cut by a new meander where, below the ceiling, the "Big Collapse Hall" opened up. The following meander was not wide, with a small stream at the bottom, in places covered with dripstone. Another tributary joined from the left.

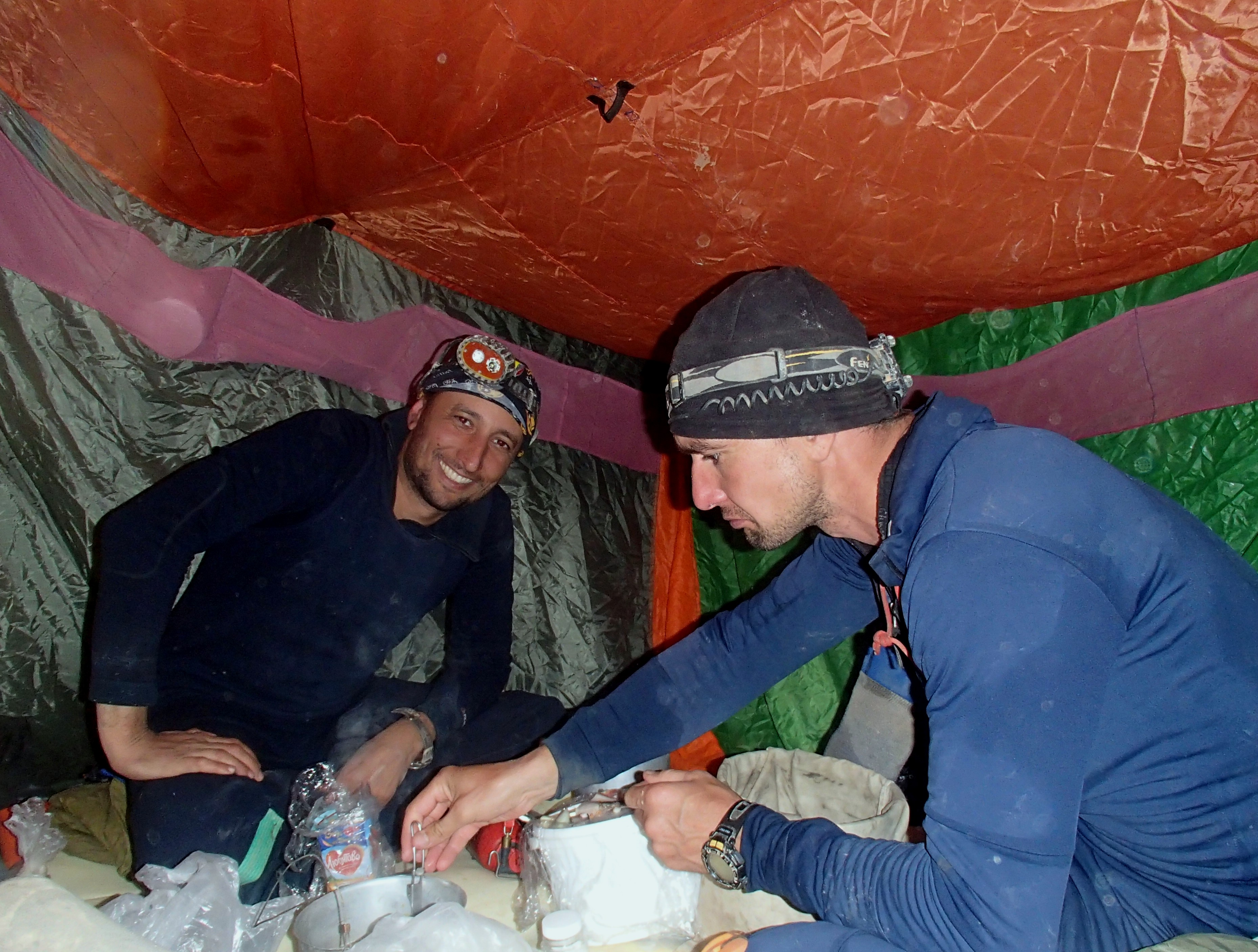
Vasilij Samsonov and Sergej Terehin in Camp −168 m, 2019

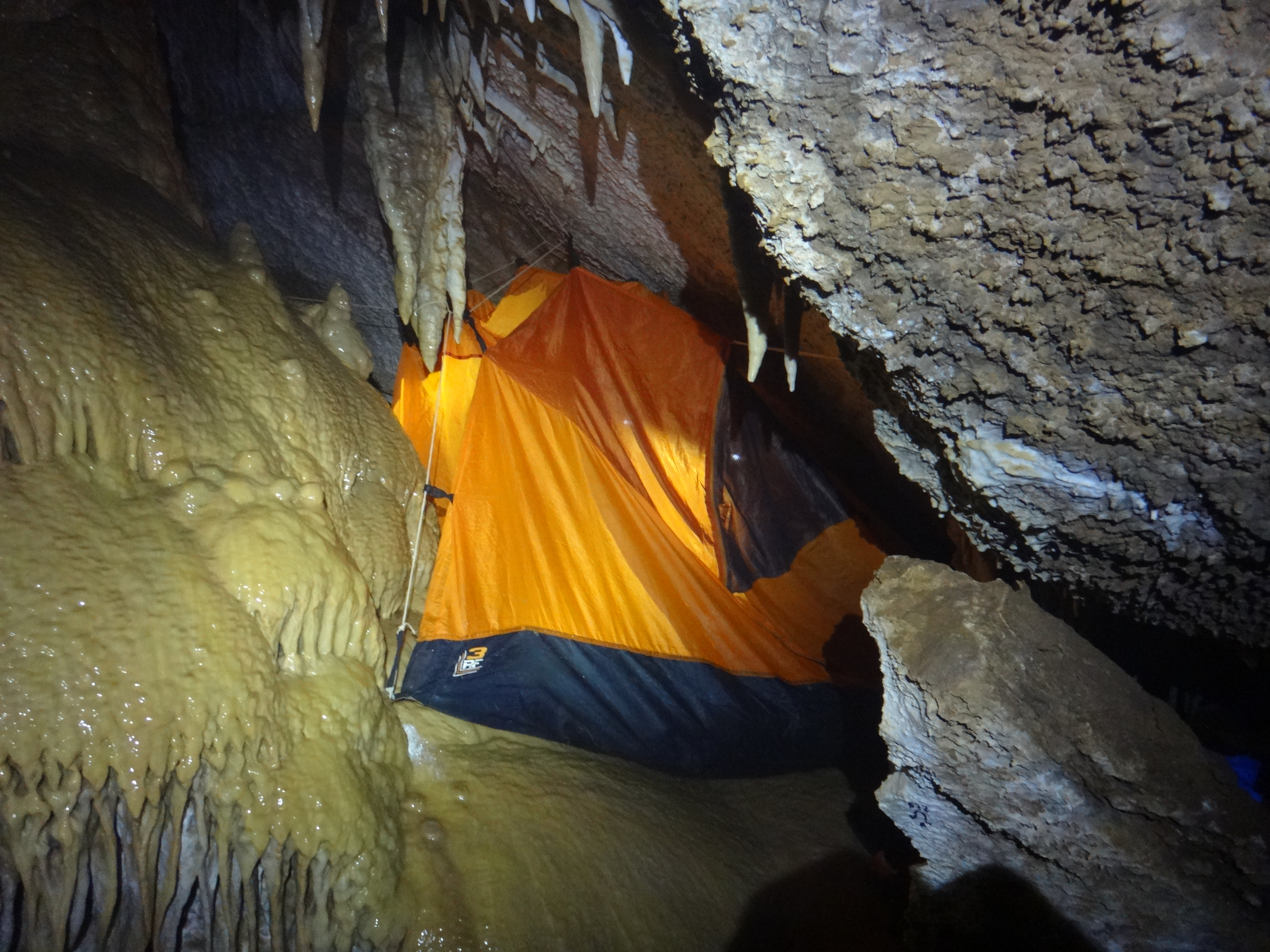
Camp Gnezdo (Nest) at −1049 m, 2019

The passage continued with a few small drops that needed rigging. The beautiful colored meander was named "Amber River" because of the many dripstone formations. From the right came a larger inflow, most likely the main stream which disappeared in the floor before the Big Gallery. The junction was named "Aquapark", because crossing it required a run under a shower. On the left, under the ceiling of the meander, on a small shelf, the Camp Gnezdo (Nest) was set up. An even larger meander followed, with a stream of about 1 liter/second. It could seem very small, but for this arid mountain it is a lot. Soon a 12-meter drop, "Freerope", came, with a good shower, followed by 10-, 8-, and 12-meter pits that also required rigging. The party stopped on top of another 20-meter shaft, named "50 m rope", after which one more pit was visible. There was no more time, no more rope, and no more anchors. The cave ran steadily in the direction of a cascade of pits in the New Branch of Boybuloq. Višnevskij cave was deepened to 1131 m and prolonged to 8004 m. Three underground camps were installed, at −168 m, −614 m, and −1049 m; 2628 m of new tunnels were surveyed, with 438 m of new depth.

The deepest point reached in Višnevskij was 50 m vertically (above) and 200 m horizontally apart from Boybuloq. The connection would make a single cave with the depth of 2,033 metres (6,670 ft).

Cave profile of Boybuloq and Višnevskij caves with surface

In 2020, due to the COVID-19 pandemic, the plans for a large expedition to caves of Chul-Bair mountain ridge, especially to the Višnevskij cave, were put on hold.

In 2021, a window of opportunity opened up in June, and an 18-member Russian-French-Slovenian-Uzbek expedition called Boybuloq 2021 took place in August. It was also organized in the framework of SGS and ASU, led by Vadim Loginov. The Višnevskij cave continued, after the terminal point reached in 2019, with a series of small pits, followed by a 30-meter shaft. At its bottom there were several continuations. The cavers followed the water, and they reached a half-siphon, with little space from the water to the ceiling, followed by two more such half-siphons. The cave continued with a tunnel, with a drop of 20 m, where the water stream, about 10 liters/second, flowed into a large siphon. It would require diving; a dry bypass could not be found. After examining other options, the expedition managed to decrease the intercave distance to 70 m, between the two meanders in both caves, at approximately the same altitude above sea level, both still too narrow to pass.

In 2023, three teams of the Boybuloq 2023 expedition worked in the Višnevskij cave. The mining group was widening the narrows in the direction of Boybuloq, gained 35 meters; again there was no draught. The climbing group was exploring the tunnels on top of the chimneys. At the top of one of them they dug through to a tunnel which ended after 30 meters. The siphon-draining group was emptying a smaller suspended siphon in the lower part of the cave, using hermetic bags. They managed to drain the siphon only halfway. A permanent connection between the two caves was also established, using Nicola phones. The best connection was also searched for with sounds from both sides (drilling, hammer blows). The best transfer of sound was near the siphon which was being dried, and the nearest tunnel in Boybuloq. According to the survey the distance between the two points is 70 meters but, due to the clear sound connection, it is probably less than 50 meters. Višnevskij cave remained 1283 meters deep; its length increased to 8.6 km.

== Cave and the World ==
Discoveries in the Višnevskij and Boybuloq caves, achieved during the 2019–2023 expeditions, confirmed the assumption about the existence of a very deep, complex, and widespread high-mountain cave system on the Chul-Bair ridge.

In the world there are 14 mountains higher than 8,000 meters—the first was scaled in 1950 and the last in 1964—but only 2 caves are deeper than 2,000 meters. Both so-called supercaves, the last terrestrial frontiers, achieved that status half a century later; Krubera-Voronja (2,197 m) surpassed 2,000 m in 2004, after 44 years of exploration, and Verëvkina (2,212 m) in 2017, 49 years after its discovery. The anticipated connection of Boybuloq and Višnevskij cave would make the third such cave. In 2001 the location of the deepest cave in the world moved from Central Europe to Abkhazia in the Western Caucasus where, as of 2020, the four deepest-known caves were found. The possibility for achieving greater depths is, limited as the cave entrance elevations in the relevant limestone areas, the Arabika and Bzyb massifs, rarely surpass 2300 m (top peaks are Mt. Arabika at 2656 m and Mt. Napra at 2684 m). The other two limestone areas with known great deep-cave potential are the Sierra Juárez of Oaxaca in southern Mexico with Chevé Cave, where the limestone layer is over 2,500 m thick, and Aladaglar massif in Turkey with Kuzgun cave, with limestone thickness of 4,000 m. Yet despite very substantial efforts, over 40 years of work in Sierra Juárez and over 20 years in Aladaglar, no depth past the 1524 m and 1400 m, respectively, could be reached.

All these facts considerably increased the attention, paid to Boybuloq, to Uzbekistan, and to central Asia, in the speleo world. Several regional projects were initiated, such as Research of karst and the caves of mountain Baysun-Tau, 2020–2021, Karst on the Roof of the World (Pamir, Tajikistan), 2020–2021, Central Asian transboundary speleoproject, Speleological expedition "Tuya-Muyun – 2021 (Foothills of the Alai ridge, Kyrgyzstan). Boybuloq and Chul-Bair were also added to the list of Uzbekistan tourist attractions.

The cave was covered in the book of the visit by Italian cavers in 1989, it featured in a report by BBC, there are several pages devoted to it in the book by SGS, the team who developed the cave, and it is the main subject in a novel by one of the team members.

== See also ==
- List of caves
- List of deepest caves
- Speleology
