= Hölloch =

Cave

- Location within Switzerland
- Location: Canton of Schwyz, Switzerland
- Coordinates: 46°58′35.9″N 8°47′18.2″E
- Depth: 1,033 m (3,389 ft)
- Length: 211.229 km (131.252 mi)
- Discovery: 1875
- Geology: Limestone
- Show cave opened: 1906

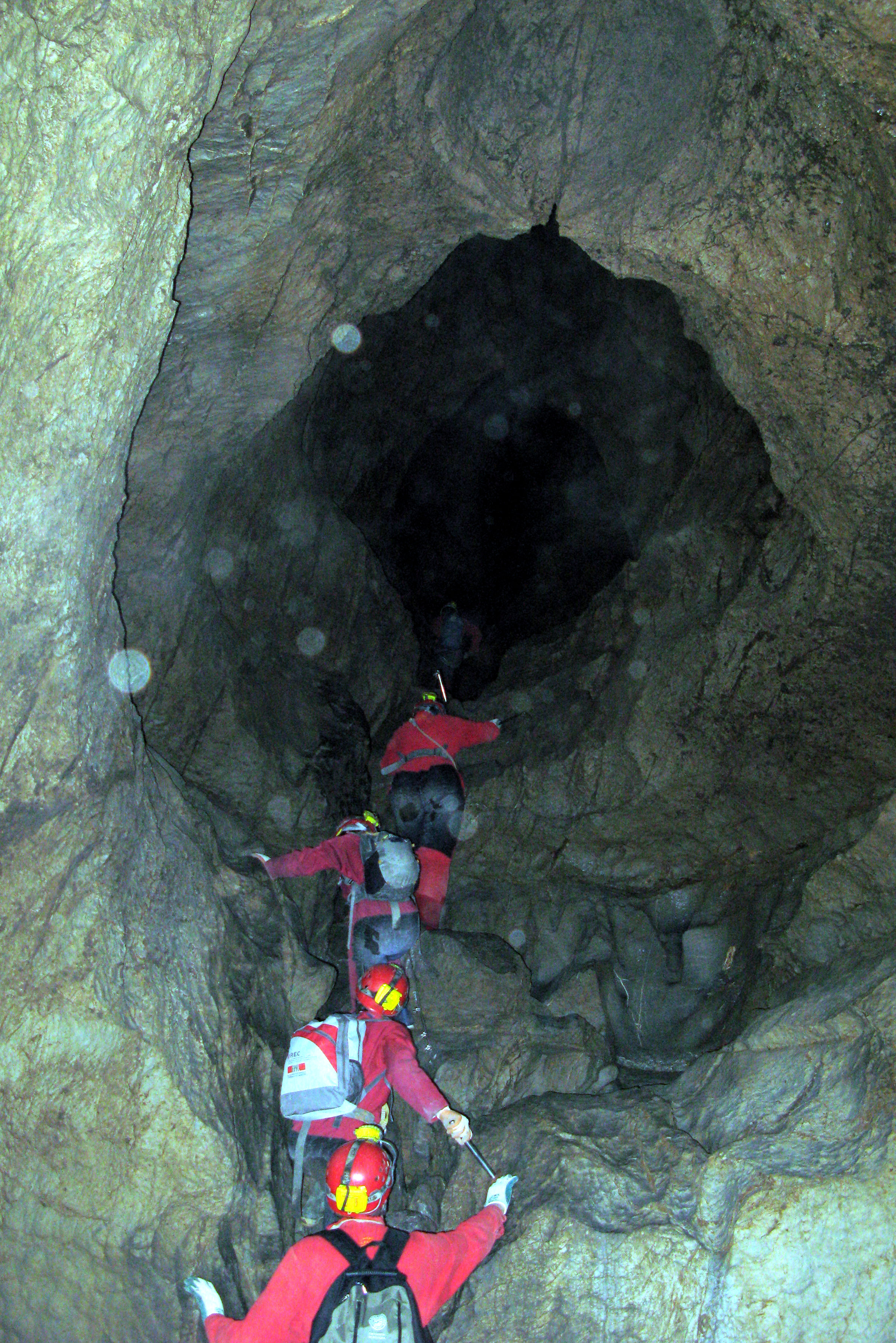
Cavers in the Hölloch

The Hölloch (English: Hellhole) is a 211.2 km (131.2 mi) long cave in the municipality Muotathal in Switzerland. In addition to being the third longest cave in Europe and the 11th longest in the world, it is also notable for having a depth of 1,033 m (3,389 ft). The Hölloch is an example of a karst cave system.

== Exploration ==
The cave was first scientifically explored in 1875 by a group led by Alois Ulrich. Later expeditions in the 1950s by Alfred Bögli, one of the pioneers of speleology, managed to explore a large part of the cave.

The explored length of the cave increased from 25 km (16 mi) in 1952 to 100 km (62 mi) by 1968. It was the first cave in the world where the explored length reached 100 km. Until the linkage of the Flint Ridge Cave System to the Mammoth Cave System was discovered in 1972, it was believed to be the largest cave system in the world.

Despite this, exploration of the Hölloch continued, and in 1976 it had been mapped to approximately 130 km (81 mi) long.

== Tourism ==
A portion of the cave near the entrance is open to visitors, but the remainder is restricted to qualified cavers only owing to its enormous size.

== See also ==
- List of caves in Switzerland
- List of longest caves
- List of deepest caves
