= List of longest caves =

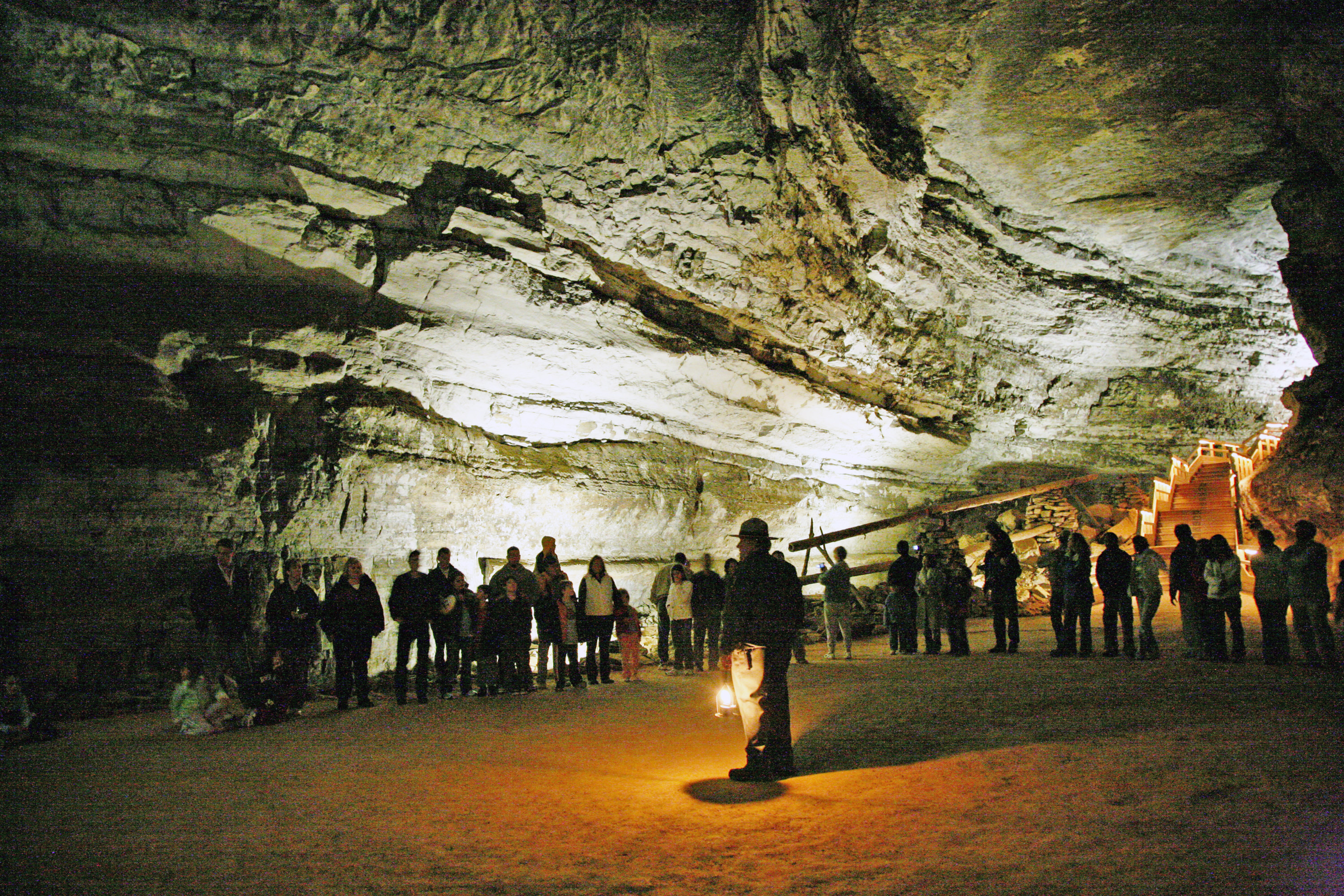
Mammoth Cave, the world's longest known cave system

This list of longest caves includes caves in which the combined length of documented passageways exceeds 100 kilometres (62 mi). In some of these caves, passageways are still being discovered.

== Geographical distribution ==
Caves are found around the world, though the largest tend to form in karstic landscapes, where soluble rocks such as carbonates and evaporites are dissolved by groundwater. Though karst cave formation is complex, preferable conditions include a high density of joints or fractures in the rock, suitable rainfall to maintain groundwater levels, and low topography to allow for ease of infiltration.

The highest concentrations of long caves in the world are found in the Pennyroyal Plateau of southern Kentucky, United States, in the Black Hills of South Dakota, United States, and in the Yucatán Peninsula, Mexico.

== List ==
| # | System | Length | Location | Coordinates | Discovery | Associated parks, protected areas |
|---|---|---|---|---|---|---|
| 1 | Mammoth Cave | 685.6 km (426.0 mi) | near Brownsville, Kentucky, United States | 37.18758°N 86.10357°W | Prehistoric | Mammoth Cave National Park, also a World Heritage Site, International Biosphere Reserve, and International Dark Sky Park |
| 2 | Sistema Ox Bel Ha | 541.7 km (336.6 mi) | near Tulum, Quintana Roo, Mexico | 20.16028°N 87.48750°W | Prehistoric | southern parts in Sian Ka'an Biosphere Reserve |
| 3 | Shuanghedong Cave Network | 481.5 km (299.2 mi) | Guizhou, China | 28.24199°N 107.27608°E | 1988 | Suiyang Shuanghedong National Geopark |
| 4 | Sistema Sac Actun / Sistema Dos Ojos | 387.1 km (240.5 mi) | near Tulum, Quintana Roo, Mexico | 20.246556°N 87.464111°W | Prehistoric | |
| 5 | Jewel Cave | 354.59 km (220.3 mi) | near Custer, South Dakota, United States | 43.72944°N 103.82944°W | 1900 | Jewel Cave National Monument |
| 6 | Wind Cave | 270.4 km (168.0 mi) | near Hot Springs, South Dakota, United States | 43.55804°N 103.47955°W | 1881 | Wind Cave National Park |
| 7 | Clearwater Cave System | 268.6 km (166.9 mi) | near Miri, Sarawak, Malaysia | 4.06529°N 114.83176°E | 1978 | Gunung Mulu National Park, also a World Heritage Site |
| 8 | Optymistychna Cave | 264.5 km (164.4 mi) | near Korolivka, Ukraine | 48.738830378°N 25.989496042°E | 1966 | Dniester Canyon National Nature Park |
| 9 | Lechuguilla Cave | 244.7 km (152.0 mi) | near Carlsbad, New Mexico, United States | 32.1906420°N 104.5033091°W | 1900 | Carlsbad Caverns National Park |
| 10 | Sistema del Alto Tejuelo | 218.5 km (135.8 mi) | Cantabria, Spain | 43.2530670°N 3.6807990°W | 1965 | |
| 11 | Fisher Ridge Cave System | 215.9 km (134.2 mi) | near Brownsville, Kentucky, United States | 37.191736°N 85.980122°W | 1981 | partly within Mammoth Cave National Park |
| 12 | Hölloch | 213.2 km (132.5 mi) | Muotathal, Switzerland | 46.976670°N 8.788330°E | 1875 | |
| 13 | Siebenhengste-Hohgant-Höhle | 164.5 km (102.2 mi) | Switzerland | 46.783822°N 7.901231°E | 1966 | |
| 14 | Schönberg Cave System | 159.6 km (99.17 mi) | Austria | 47.701528°N 13.772333°E | 1976 | |
| 15 | Mortillano system | 148.6 km (92.34 mi) | Cantabria, Spain | 43.23082°N 3.56197°W | 1960 | |
| 16 | Priest's Grotto | 142.1 km (88.30 mi) | Ukraine | 48.7644444°N 25.9658330555°E | 1940 | |
| 17 | Schwarzmooskogel-Höhlensystem | 141.4 km (87.86 mi) | Austria | 47.661940°N 13.803060°E | 1929 | |
| 18 | Marosakabe cave system | 132 km (82.02 mi) | Madagascar | 16.45189°S 45.33543°E | 2006 | Tsingy de Namoroka Strict Nature Reserve |
| 19 | Réseau Félix Trombe | 127.6 km (79.29 mi) | France | 42.972500°N 0.866390°E | 1908 | |
| 20 | Bullita Cave | 123 km (76.43 mi) | Australia | 16.063330°S 130.383330°E | 1990 | Gregory National Park |
| 21 | Hirlatzhöhle | 120.5 km (74.88 mi) | Austria | 47.544975°N 13.630953°E | 1949 | |
| 22 | Helms Deep Cave | 119.8 km (74.44 mi) · | Perry County, Tennessee, United States | 35.566667°N 87.683333°W | 1970 | |
| 23 | Sistema del Gandara | 119.0 km (73.94 mi) | Cantabria, Spain | 43.1927260°N 3.5794850°W | 2005 | |
| 24 | Toca da Boa Vista | 114 km (70.84 mi) | Brazil | 10.162500°S 40.859722°W | 1987 | |
| 25 | Ojo Guareña | 111 km (68.97 mi) | Spain | 43.03376°N 3.63059°W | 1956 | |
| 26 | Sistema K'oox Baal | 103.9 km (64.56 mi) | near Tulum, Quintana Roo, Mexico | 20.372622°N 87.417239°W | 1987 | |
| 27 | Sistema Purificacion | 101.4 km (63.01 mi) | Mexico | 24°04′03.30″N 99°33′54.93″W | 1970 | |
| 28 | Sistema Huautla | 100.2 km (62.26 mi) | Mexico | 18°07′16.37″N 96°48′00.03″W | 1965 | |

== See also ==
- List of caves
- List of longest caves by country
- List of longest Dinaric caves
- List of deepest caves
- Show cave
- Speleology
