= Teshik-Tash 1 =

Archaeological site in Uzbekistan

Coordinates: 37°57′57″N 67°09′23″E

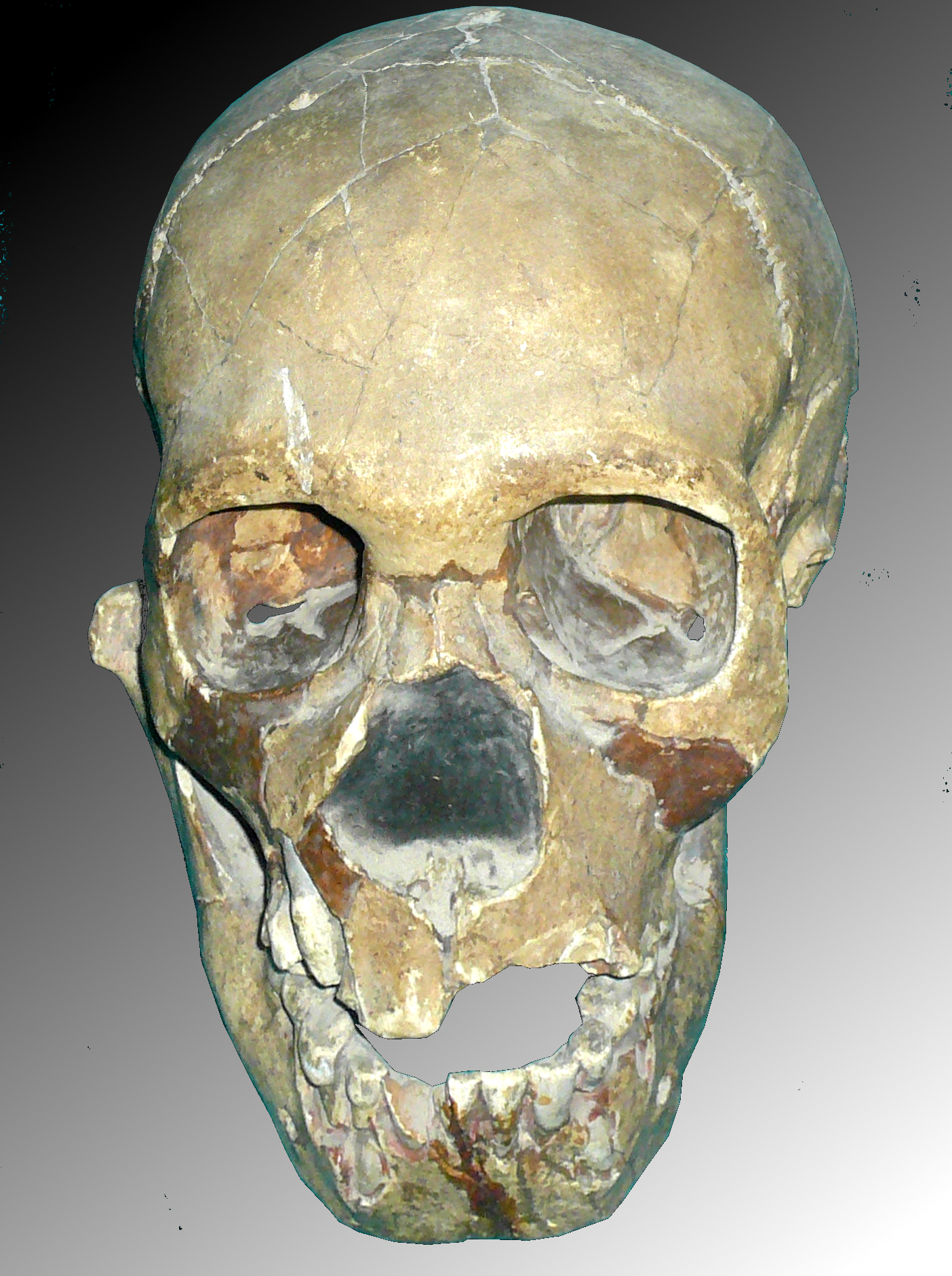
- Teshik-Tash 1
- Common name: Teshik-Tash 1
- Species: Homo neanderthalensis (mtDNA confirmed)
- Age: No dates produced
- Place discovered: Teshik-Tash Cave, Uzbek SSR, USSR
- Date discovered: 1938
- Discovered by: Alexey Okladnikov

Map

Teshik-Tash 1 is a Neanderthal skeleton discovered in 1938 in Teshik-Tash Cave, in the Bajsuntau mountain range, Uzbek SSR (Uzbekistan), Central Asia.

The remains were discovered in 1938 by A. P. Okladnikov. They were found in a shallow pit, reported to be associated with five pairs of Siberian ibex horn cores. Dental analysis concluded that the skull belonged to an 8 to 11-year-old child. The horn cores were found around the perimeter of the grave surrounding the cranial remains. This has led a number of researchers to believe the child was ritually buried.

The site was excavated in five cultural layers of sediment with Mousterian artifacts.

Lack of adequate published material on the excavation and the numerous Ibex bones (761) found led to this interpretation being questioned. Paul Mellars, questioning the ritual interpretation, suggested that the bones may not have been deliberately placed. Others (e.g., Gargett) believe it is no burial at all.

== Date ==
The remains are not dated. Based on the archaeology, fauna, and skeleton itself, it is thought to come from the Middle Palaeolithic (300,000 to 40,000 years ago).

== Skull ==
=== Reconstruction ===
The Teshik-Tash skull was reconstructed from 150 bone fragments. The skull was crushed due to the several layers of sediment that lay on top of it.

	in	cm
Height	7.75	19.69
Width	5.5	13.97
Length	6	15.24

=== Controversy ===
The Teshik-Tash skull’s dental analysis placed the age of the hominin between 8–9 years old at the time of death. The size of the skull was relatively larger than that of a modern child’s skull of the same age. Archaeologists suggested that this was because Neanderthals had a faster rate of growth than modern Homo sapiens adolescences. The skull is larger and taller and exhibited typical Neanderthal traits such as an occipital bun, oval-shaped foramen magnum, shovel-shaped incisors, supraorbital ridge, and the absence of a strong chin. Other midfacial features of the skull such as the lingual of the mandibular foramen were said to be more characteristic of modern humans than Neanderthals. The morphological features of the Teshik-Tash skull lead researchers to question the classification as some argued that it was closer in morphological association with Upper Paleolithic Homo sapiens. Statistical analysis of 27 linear measurements placed the Teshik-Tash skull and mandible outside the variation of the Neanderthals and associated it with Upper Paleolithic humans.

=== DNA analysis ===
mtDNA analysis was conducted on the Teshik-Tash skull which confirmed that the skull was Neanderthal. Further genetic research concluded that near-eastern Neanderthals were somewhat segregated from northwestern European Neanderthals and early Neanderthals along the Mediterranean. This data is suggested through consistent low levels of gene flow between Neanderthals and modern humans in the Near East.

== Significance ==
Prior to the discovery of the Teshik-Tash skull in 1938, it was thought that Neanderthals had not spread east enough to reach Central Asia.

== See also ==
- List of human evolution fossils
- List of Neanderthal sites
