= Mortillano system =

Karst system in Spain

- Location within Spain
- Location: Cantabria, Spain
- Coordinates: 43°13′51″N 3°34′04″W
- Depth: 950 m (3,120 ft)
- Length: 146.500 km (91.031 mi)
- Discovery: 1960
- Geology: Limestone

The Mortillano system is the second longest karst system in Spain and one of the largest in Europe, the sixth, with 146.5 km of galleries. It is also the 15th longest cave system in the world.

== History ==
Explorations of the system began in the 1960s and were resumed in the 1990s. Since then, more than 20 inlets and eight underground rivers with a large number of small tributaries have been found.

== See also ==
- List of longest caves
