= List of deepest caves =

This list of deepest caves includes the deepest known natural caves according to maximum surveyed depth as of 2025. The depth value is measured from the highest to the lowest accessible cave point.

#	Name	Depth (m)	Length (km)	Length (mi)	Country	Coordinates
1	Krubera-Voronja Cave	2224	23.0 km	14.3 mi	Abkhazia / Georgia	43°25′04.0″N 40°18′35.4″E
2	Veryovkina Cave	2209	17.5 km	10.9 mi	Abkhazia / Georgia	43°23′51″N 40°21′34.9″E
3	Sarma Cave	1830	19.2 km	11.9 mi	Abkhazia / Georgia	43°24′56.2″N 40°21′50″E
4	Tovliani Cave	1760	40.8 km	25.4 mi	Abkhazia / Georgia	43°15′53″N 40°43′06″E
5	Lamprechtsofen	1727	61.0 km	37.9 mi	Austria	47°31′34″N 12°44′21″E
6	Gouffre Mirolda	1661	22.0 km	13.7 mi	France	46°05′19.9″N 6°46′14.0″E
7	Gouffre Jean-Bernard	1612	30.2 km	18.8 mi	France	46°06′08″N 6°46′46.6″E
8	Sistema del Cerro del Cuevón	1589	7.0 km	4.3 mi	Spain	43°13′14″N 4°51′37″W
9	Hirlatzhöhle	1560	120.5 km	74.9 mi	Austria	47°32′41.9″N 13°37′51.5″E
10	Sistema Huautla	1560	100.2 km	62.3 mi	Mexico	18°07′16.37″N 96°48′00.03″W
11	Chevé Cave	1538	96.1 km	59.7 mi	Mexico	17°51′51.6″N 96°47′39.6″W
12	Boybuloq	1523	19.9 km	12.4 mi	Uzbekistan	38°23′04″N 67°30′06″E
13	Pantyukhin Cave	1508	7.9 km	4.9 mi	Abkhazia / Georgia	43°19′54.4″N 40°29′56.9″E
14	Sima de la Cornisa	1507	6.4 km	4.0 mi	Spain	43°10′45″N 04°51′51″W
15	Čehi 2	1505	5.5 km	3.4 mi	Slovenia	46°22′01″N 13°30′36″E
16	Sistema del Trave	1441	9.1 km	5.7 mi	Spain	43°13′16″N 04°51′29″W
17	Lukina-Trojama system	1431	3.7 km	2.3 mi	Croatia	44°46′01″N 15°01′35″E
18	Egma Sinkhole	1429	3.1 km	1.9 mi	Turkey	36°18′54″N 32°46′44″E
19	Gouffre de la Pierre Saint-Martin	1410	88.1 km	54.7 mi.	France, Spain	42°58′05″N 0°46′10″W
20	Kuzgun Cave	1400	3.1 km	1.9 mi	Turkey	37°50′13.50″N 35°17′12.31″E
21	Hochscharten-Höhlensystem	1394	14.6 km	9.1 mi	Austria	47°35′10.8″N 13°05′40.1″E
22	Črnelsko brezno	1393	20.0 km	12.4 mi	Slovenia	46°22′25.8″N 13°30′56.5″E
23	Abisso Paolo Roversi	1360	4.2 km	2.6 mi	Italy	44°06′43.5″N 10°13′32.9″E
24	Sistema Arañonera-Tendenera	1349	46.3 km	28.8 mi	Spain	42°40′45.8″N 0°08′33.4″W
25	Sima del Sabbat (B112)	1346	6.7 km	4.2 mi	Spain	42°30′59.1″N 0°18′27.8″E
26	BU 56	1340	38.9 km	24.2 mi	Spain	42°55′37.4″N 0°45′28.1″W
27	Siebenhengste-Hohgant-Höhle	1340	164.5 km	102.2 mi	Switzerland	46°47′1.76″N 7°54′4.43″E
28	Nedam	1335	3.3 km	2.1 mi	Croatia	44°45′41.4″N 15°01′56.0″E
29	Slovačka jama	1324	6.4 km	4.0 mi	Croatia	44°44′53″N 15°00′16″E
30	Renetovo brezno	1322	15.3 km	9.5 mi	Slovenia	46°21′18.9″N 13°26′42.4″E
31	Mala Boka	1319	11.9 km	7.4 mi	Slovenia	46°19′16.6″N 13°29′28.6″E
32	Complesso del Releccio Alfredo Bini	1313	25.3 km	15.7 mi	Italy	45°57′27.6″N 9°22′52.8″E
33	Kuchlberg-Höhlensystem	1307	39.0 km	24.2 mi	Austria	47°33′18″N 13°16′0.1″E
34	Jojar Cave	1300	2.2 km	1.4 mi	Iran	34°25′31.2″N 47°16′51.6″E
35	Cosanostraloch - Berger - Platteneck Höhlensystem	1291	30.3 km	18.8 mi	Austria	47°33′27″N 13°13′16″E
36	Ilyukhin Cave	1286	8.9 km	5.5 mi	Abkhazia / Georgia	43.43146°N 40.35288°E
37	Višnevskij Cave	1283	8.5 km	5.3 mi	Uzbekistan	38°22′27″N 67°31′58″E
38	Cueva Charco	1278	6.7 km	4.2 mi	Mexico	17°56′12″N 96°46′25.8″W
39	Morca Cave	1276	5.7 km	3.5 mi	Turkey	36°18′33.7″N 32°39′37.4″E
40	Sistema del (Pozu) Xitu - Cueva de Culiembro	1264	10.7 km	6.6 mi	Spain	43°14′25.8″N 4°55′36.9″W
41	Moskovuri	1260	2.5 km	1.6 mi	Abkhazia / Georgia	43°26′30″N 40°22′56.7″E
42	Gouffre Berger	1258	45.0 km	28.0 mi	France	45°13′09″N 5°36′17.2″E
43	Réseau du Casoar	1258	17.3 km	10.7 mi	Papua New Guinea	5°28′53″S 151°20′46″E
44	Torca dos los Rebecos	1255	2.2 km	1.4 mi	Spain	43°13′01.8″N 4°51′28.7″W
45	Pozo del Madejuno	1252	2.8 km	1.7 mi	Spain	43°10′05.4″N 4°50′40.5″W
46	Sistema J2	1229	14.8 km	9.2 mi	Mexico	17°54′13.75″N 96°45′46.76″W

== See also ==
- List of caves
- List of deepest Dinaric caves
- List of deepest mines
- List of longest caves
- List of sinkholes
- Show cave
- Speleology
