= Ekaterinburg Speleo Club =

Russian speleological organization

- Abbreviation: SGS
- Formation: 1961
- Founder: Jurij Lobanov; Nikolaj Lizunov
- Purpose: Caving club
- Headquarters: Pereulok Asbestovskij 2/1, Ekaterinburg
- Coordinates: 56°50′51.6″N 60°37′50.9″E
- Region served: Sverdlovsk Oblast
- Members: 200
- Official language: Russian
- President: Vadim Loginov
- Affiliations: Association of Speleologists of the Urals, Russian Speleological Union
- Website: sgs.su
- Contact: +7 (343) 201-99-77

Ekaterinburg Speleo Club (SGS) (from Sverdlovskaja Gorodskaja Speleosekcija; (Note: For greater accuracy Cyrillic names in this article are romanized according to Scientific transliteration of Cyrillic.) Свердловская Городская Спелеосекция – СГС), founded in 1961, is a Russian, non-profit speleological organization dedicated to the exploration, research, and conservation of caves. It is based in Ekaterinburg (named Sverdlovsk from 1924 to 1991), the fourth largest city of Russia, in the Middle Urals and on the western edge of Siberia. SGS is most known for the exploration of caves in the northern Sverdlovsk Oblast and high-mountain karst areas of Surxondaryo Region in Uzbekistan, including Boybuloq, the deepest cave in Central Asia and one of the deepest caves in the world.

== Early history ==
In summer 1961 three hikers from Ekaterinburg, Jurij Lobanov, Nikolaj Lizunov, and Anatolij Vagapov wanted to cross the Ural Mountain ridge and to raft down the Višera river. On the way, they encountered, near Severouralsk, below a rock overhang, a shaft with a very narrow entrance. They managed to descend into the cave, full of stalactites, and climbed back to the surface with great difficulty. The whole experience persuaded them to turn from hikers to cavers. Soon the first own cave, Svetlaja, in the Northern Ural was discovered and explored. In the autumn of 1961, a team was formed, two substantial caves on the Serga river were discovered and SGS, speleo section of the Sverdlovsk city tourist club established. It was the third speleological organization in the Soviet Union, after cavers from Krasnojarsk and the Crimea.

In 1962 SGS organized a search expedition to the Southern Ural and participated in the first all-Union meeting of speleologists in the Crimea, on the Ai-Petri mountain. In 1964 SGS organized its first caving school, with 160 participants, and in 1965 SGS separated from the city tourist club, obtained its own premises. Till 1968 several expeditions followed every year, to the caves of the Urals and Caucasus, including the extensive Sumgan-Kutuk cave in Bashkiriya National Park. In the 1970s further advancement was hampered by increasingly outdated and cumbersome equipment. Wire ladders were unsuitable for the descent and ascent in vertical sections of ever deeper caves, and the application of the single rope technique lagged behind because of stagnant, slow communication with the West. Cavers had to rely on locally, often even handmade equipment. At the end of the decade, technical problems were solved, SGS teams participated in expeditions to the main focus of Soviet speleology of the time, to the deep caves in the Western Caucasus, in Russia, and in Abkhazia, on Alek and Arabika massifs. They carried equipment, rigged the vertical sections, made cave surveys, discovered new cave branches. But the credits went to the expedition leaders, caving organizations who were there before. It was time to look for new horizons, for new, more pristine caving areas.

== Boybuloq ==
After the discovery of the Kievskaja cave on the Kirk Tau plateau in Uzbekistan in 1972, 2340 m a. s. l., by cavers from Kyiv, they later explored it to the depth of 990 m and it was in the years 1977–1978 the deepest cave in the USSR, SGS cavers in the late 1970s started to search for new deep caves in the wider area. In 1980 6 small teams of 4 people were sent to different mountain karst areas of the USSR: to Kazakhstan, to Pamir in Tajikistan, to Turkmenistan, and to Uzbekistan, with modest results. Yet in the same year, Aleksandr Bikbaev from the Institute of Geology of the Ural Scientific Center discovered in geological literature a location with a much better predisposition for very deep caves: massif Ketmen-Chapty in the south-western spurs of Gissar Range in Uzbekistan. The ridges here have an unusual structure: an almost vertical northeastern side and a gentle southwestern one, made of several different rock strata, including a covered limestone layer, 200–350 meters thick. An expedition led by Aleksandr Ryžkov discovered the Zindan cave in May 1981, 3100 m a. s. l., with springs at an altitude of 1300 m. In January 1983 the final depth of 565 m was reached, in the siphon too narrow to dive. Search expeditions later in 1983 were fruitless, and SGS decided to refocus on Arabika massif, participating again in expeditions of other speleological organizations.

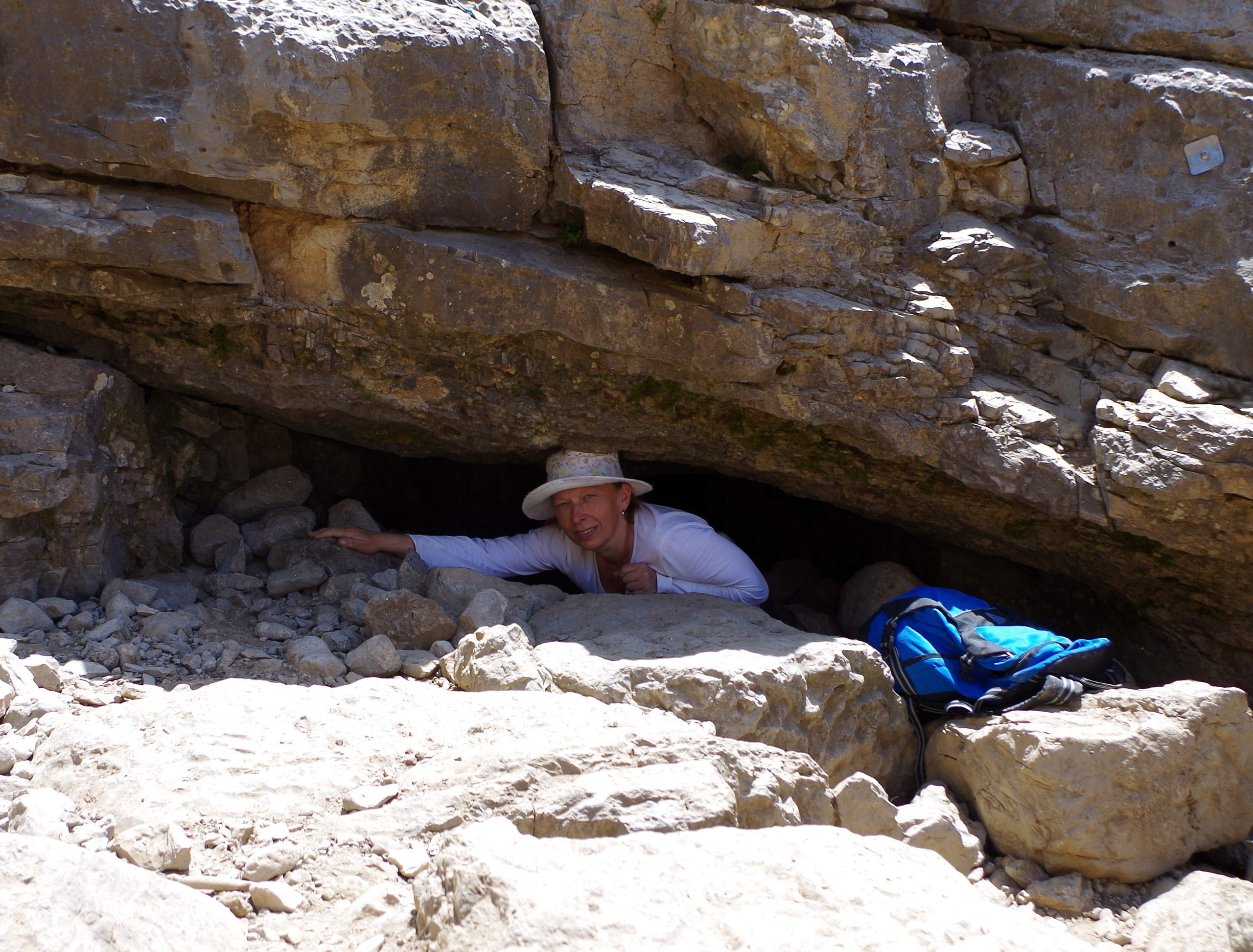
Entrance to Boybuloq, with Elena Ljubavina

In 1985 they resumed the Uzbekistan expeditions, to explore caves the entrances of which were discovered in 1984 by a token SGS team dispatched to Hodja-Gur-Gur-Ata massif. A group of five expedition members was sent to Surkhan-Tau ridge to scout its surface for new caves. On the way, in the village Kurgancha, 1455 m a. s. l., they were told of a cave higher in the mountain, called Boybuloq where a villager from the highest settlement in Uzbekistan, the Dehibolo (boy buloq = rich spring in Uzbek and in Tajiki, the language of the people from the village), went in 1971 and never returned. They followed the stream bed, discovered the cave, with a small entrance at an altitude of 2647 m, and followed its narrow meander which slowly ascended 600 meters in a straight direction, to a height of 90 meters, where it turned down. Below the 27-meter shaft, they discovered human remains, of Mustafaqul Zakirov, a teacher from Dehibolo who visited the cave, four hours away on foot, several times before. In May 1971, in time of severe drought, he departed to the cave with his son and pack donkeys to fetch water. He entered the cave, and after a long crawl, he reached the point close to the first shaft, where his kerosene lamp went out. In the darkness, he missed the direction towards the outside and fell into the abyss. Not only Boybuloq but most other caves in the area are a long sequence of very narrow passages which are difficult to pass, due to the geological situation and the very meager quantities of water present during the cave formation. All the (tiny) streams flowing in different directions in Boybuloq are, apparently, of condensation origin, since the floods the cavers observed on the surface do not reach the lower horizons of the cave.

Boybuloq – cave profile with surface NW-SE, from the SW

In the following years further expeditions took place: in 1986 the cave was deepened to −400 m, in 1987 to −500 m and the remains of Zokirov were returned to his family, in 1988 a siphon at −600 m was free-dived and also the barrier on the other side lowered so that the lake could be waded through, and a new branch of the cave was discovered – it continued to −900 m. In 1989 a combined Soviet-Italian team reached the terminal siphon at −1158 m and managed to climb upwards to the point at an elevation of +156 m which gave the total cave depth of 1310 m. In 1990 a Soviet-British team managed to extend the New branch in the cave upwards to +222 m (total depth 1376 m), in 1991 lower levels of the New branch were discovered, and in 1992 an additional chimney upwards was climbed, to +257 m which gave the final cave depth of 1415 m. In 1995 a major collapse in the cave was dug through and in 1998 the diving of the siphon at −560 m was unsuccessful, and the spring Holtan-Čašma, where the water from the terminal cave siphon comes to light, was also dived. The spring is situated 130 m below the terminal cave siphon while the horizontal distance is 7 km, so the connecting passages are most likely submerged. The turmoil which followed the dissolution of the Soviet Union was unfavorable for caving expeditions. SGS cavers returned to Boybuloq only in 2007, and expeditions followed almost every year. New passages in Boybuloq were discovered and explored, yet the cave depth remained the same. Diving in the Holtan-Čašma spring was resumed in 2014, 2015, and 2016, when, at a horizontal distance of 170 m and depth of 18 m, a lenticular grotto was reached, with impassable downwards extending slots.

== Hodja-Gur-Gur-Ata ==
There are three ridges in the south-western spurs of the Gissar Range, part of the Tian Shan mountain chain, to the west of Baysun: Ketmen-Chapty, Hodja-Gur-Gur-Ata, and Chul-Bair. They all include limestone strata. When the Zindan cave on Ketmen-Chapty, explored from 1981, ended with an impassable siphon in 1983, SGS refocused on Arabika massif in Abkhazia. In the summer of 1984 a small expedition of 9 people, led by Viktor Dianov, nevertheless departed to Uzbekistan, to try to open up new caves in the sinkholes near Zindan. After several days without success two members of the team, Sergej Matrënin and Igor' Belokrys, asked Dianov to depart to the Hodja-Gur-Gur-Ata ridge on the northeastern horizon, topped at 3700 m by very distinctive precipitous mountain wall, with a karst baseline defined by the Machai spring at an altitude of 1400 m. Just for a few days to check the stories about "terribly deep caves" there, heard on the Baysun bazaar. They got four days. While hitch-hiking from Baysun to Kurgancha, the village below the ridge, fellow travelers who gave them the ride, learned that they are looking for caves. One of them showed with the hand towards the mountain wall: Why to look for them, here they are! Indeed, in the wall, there was a dark hole, which the locals called the Sacred Grotto, and next to it – either the shadows of the rock outcrops or cave entrances. Another villager recounted that somewhere behind the village of Alachapan, on the Chul-Bair ridge, there is a cave, into which a local resident ventured a few years ago and never returned. The two left the second option, which next year led to the discovery of Boybuloq, for later and the next day found the first cave of the Hodja-Gur-Gur-Ata ridge, Sifonnaja (Siphon cave). After the rendezvous with Dianov, the whole team continued to explore the surrounding caves, Berloga (Den cave) and Jubilejnaja (Jubilee cave) till the end of the expedition. In 1985 an SGS expedition led by Aleksander Babanin discovered the largest of the Southern caves on this ridge, Festival'naja. During the expeditions from 1986 to 1988 Emma Lobanova was marking the cave entrances in the up to 400 m high wall below the crest of the ridge, labeling them as R (for a reference point) and a number, for the distance in meters from Katataš, the towering rock outcrop at the far south, divided by 100. Examples are R-10, R-19, and R-21: 1000 (10 times 100) meters from Katataš to the northeast, 1900 and 2100. Marking ended 2400 m from Katataš (R-24). All the Southern caves of the ridge were included, and a few of the Northern group. Unlike many caves in the southern group, those caves required a long climbing route to access, entrances were in the middle of a 400-meter high near-vertical wall. In 1988 cavers from Iževsk managed to explore R-10 (renamed Isetskaja, 1600 m long, 220 m deep), R-19, and R-21. In 1986 Vladimir Čudinov discovered several entrances of the Northern cave group, beyond R 24. Towards the end of the 1980s Soviet Union began to open up, under the leadership of Mihail Gorbačev movements such as perestrojka and especially glasnost led to the establishment of contacts with Western cavers. One such instance involved Tullio Bernabei, a councilor of the Italian Speleological Society and Aleksandr Višnevskij, a senior member of SGS and expedition organizer. SGS expedition in 1989 included 11 Italian cavers and in the summer of 1990, Čudinov led British cavers to the main cave in the Northern group, 160 m above the wall base, which they named Dark Star and explored 2 km far and about 100 m deep. Unlike previous caves in the area, mainly composed of very tight meanders, Dark Star was wider, a large tunnel with lakes. The temperature in the cave was −3 °C and −5 °C deeper inside, so the lakes were frozen and allowed easy advancing. They stopped at a T junction with a large shaft, due to lack of equipment and time.

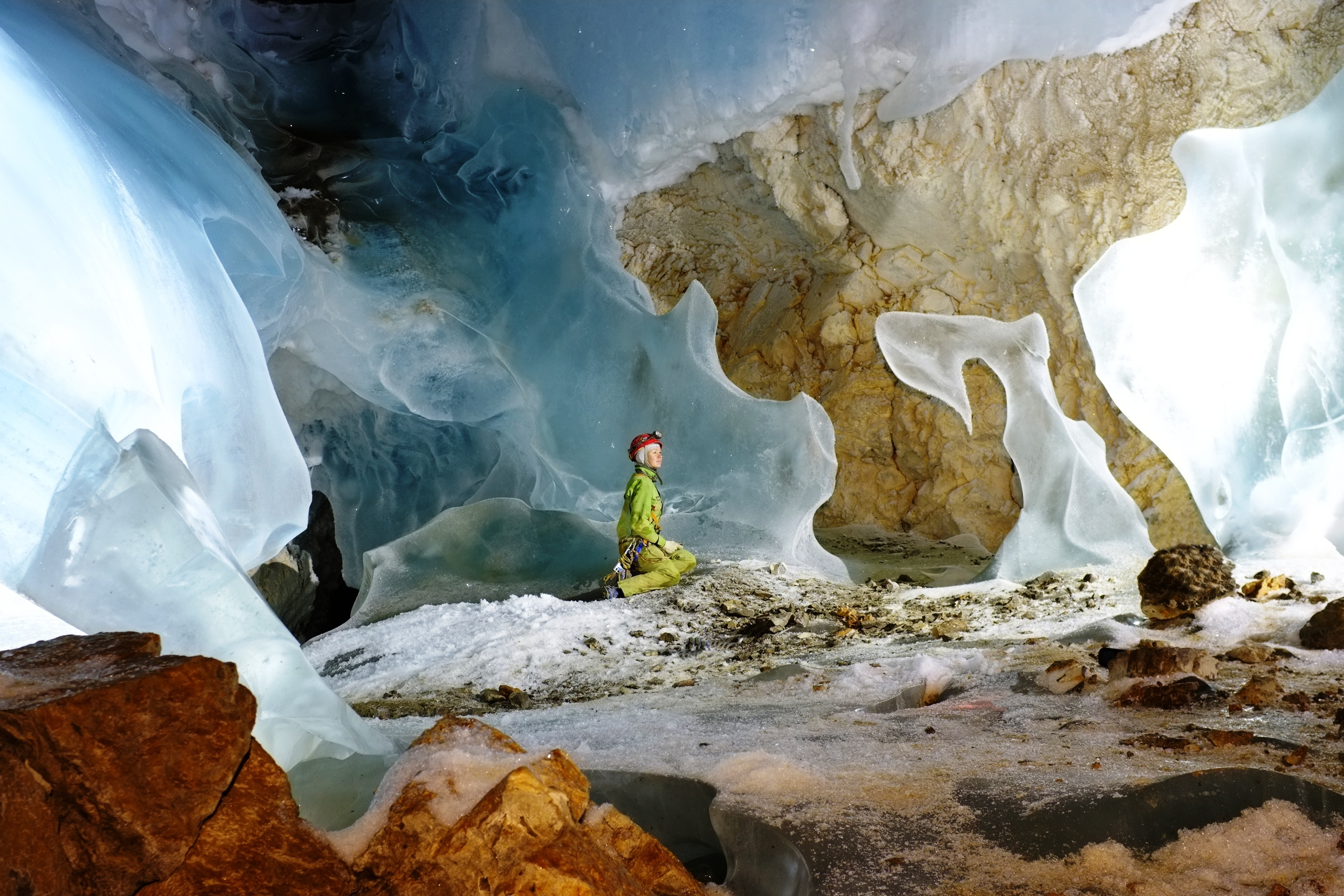
Full Moon hall, with Anastasija Buharova

In 1991 the British part of the expedition returned to the cave but it was warmer, ice in the deep lakes melted and they had to return, while the Italian team made considerable discoveries in the Ulugh Bek cave, the northernmost of the Northern group. As already mentioned in the previous chapter, the regional tensions after the dissolution of the Soviet Union, which never completely subsided, civil war in Afghanistan and its aftermath virtually stopped exploration at the ridge. A reconnaissance expedition by cavers from Krasnojarsk to the plateau on top of the ridge in 1996 discovered several promising entrances with strong air draft. They were not explored because of a lack of equipment. In 1998 a large expedition of cavers from the entire Urals region, led by Alexander Plastinin, planned to resume work in caves of the ridge but a bad injury of a participant brought the work to an abrupt end. After that cavers returned to Hodja-Gur-Gur-Ata only in 2010. That year a reconnaissance expedition found new, considerably shorter routes to the wall and to the plateau above it, better, stable water sources below the wall, and discovered several new, perspective worksites in Festival'naja cave. In August 2011 a Russian-Italian expedition of 3 teams worked at the ridge. Extremely warm spring and summer took away all the snow (and water) from the plateau and the team, tasked with the exploration of Ulugh Beg cave and caves on the plateau, could not set up camp there, but at the closest water source, just below the Dark Star cave, and they joined the second, "Dark Star" team.

Map of Dark Star and Registan caves

Surprisingly the lakes in the cave were still frozen and cavers were able to resume exploration where the Brits stopped in 1990. 1500 m of new large tunnels were discovered, a new entrance, Vino rosso, the cave also connected to Iževskaja, which enabled easier access to deeper parts of Dark Star. The cave now had 6 entrances and its depth reached 300 m. The third team, tasked with explorations in Festival'naja cave, found out that the bottom of the cave is without continuation, but they found a higher continuation in "Salavat universe", which yielded 2 km of new tunnels, including a very large hall "Everest". The survey showed that the connection to other caves of the Southern group, Jubilejnaja, Berloga, and Učitel'skaja caves was within reach. In 2012 SGS, with the support of the Association of Speleologists of the Urals (ASU), launched the largest expedition so far, with 29 participants from Russia, Italy, Spain, China, and Germany of which 10 were girls, very skillful in cave survey. They worked in 3 caves: Ulugh Beg, Festival'naja, and Dark Star. In the first one cavers needed 3 days to break through the ice-blocked tunnel but discovered new parts which ended in the mountain wall, with a new, easier cave entrance. On the plateau on the ridge, several caves were found which ended with impassable narrows. In Festival'naja cave 2 km of new tunnels were found, 1 km of which was also surveyed, and a surface survey was made which connected the cave entrance to entrances of Jubilejnaja and Berloga. In the Dark Star normal route was again impassable, lakes were full of a slurry of water and ice. The connection to Iževskaja cave, discovered in 2011, made the access possible. The team made important new discoveries, cave depth increased to 600 m, there were 6 km of new tunnels surveyed, several possible continuations remained. Samples were also taken and sensors were installed to help determine the paleoclimate of the area. An expedition result rarely surpassed in deep cave exploration. In 2013 a Russian-Italian-German team of 21 managed to substantially deepen the cave, to the level around 900 meters below the top entrance. They also discovered around 40 m high waterfall at a depth of 750 m. Previous achievements attracted the largest ever SGS expedition to Hodja-Gur-Gur-Ata in 2014, of 31 people from 6 countries which included a National Geographic photo team. A team of 4 set up camp on the ridge plateau, at an altitude of 3700 m. They surveyed a surface trek from above the Red dwarf entrance to the bottom of Dark Star. The elevation difference between the cave tunnels and the surface gradually increased from 150 m to 250 m. There were no visible tectonic faults along the way, above the cave bottom there was a small canyon on the surface, which ran in the direction of a lake, situated at an altitude of 2400 m. This fact would reduce the cave depth potential from 2100 m to 1100 m. The team also inspected the terrain from the cave area to the group of canyons close to the top of the mountain at an altitude of 3921 m. No potential cave entrances were found. They also checked the cave R-20 which closed soon. The Dark Star team examined the bottom of the cave, at a depth of 900 m, and concluded that the karst rock strata (limestone) came into contact with poorly soluble and non-karst strata such as shale and sandstone. Any advancement to greater depths would require extensive digging. The team discovered many new tunnels, of considerable length, following several small water flows in the upstream direction. In 2015 an SGS and Assoсiation of Speleologists of the Urals (ASU) expedition of 26 was divided into three teams, the largest, 14 cavers, departed to Dark Star cave and the other two to Boybuloq cave, water springs below its terminal siphon and to the plateau above the cave. At the Dark Star bottom, the team tried to push through boulder chokes and previously impassable meander tights. To no avail, any reasonable effort to get through would have to involve large-scale mining. There was progress in the higher levels of the cave, new tunnels decreased the distance from the nearest cave of the Southern group (Isetskaja) to 800 m. In 2016 the 26-strong Russian-Italian-Ukrainian expedition worked mainly in Chul-Bair. One team however departed to Hodja-Gur-Gur-Ata ridge to try to connect the Northern and Southern caves through Isetskaja cave, to check possible new cave entrances in the mountain wall, and to advance in the upper levels of the cave. In Isetskaja cave a meander, leading to the closest Northern group cave, Iževskaja, was discovered. Soon after its beginning, the meander turned away, towards the inside of the mountain. Through the entrance R-20, which is not far from Iževskaja cave entrance, cavers advanced 1300 m far and 190 m deep into the mountain, to 100 m of the nearest point in Dark Star. They renamed the cave to Registan. Progress was also made in the Dark Star, in the Forest steppe tunnel. Further work on Hodja-Gur-Gur-Ata was put on hold, all the efforts were directed to the Višnevskij cave.

== Višnevskij ==
In 2015, the year of the death of Aleksandr Višnevskij, leader of SGS expeditions to Boybuloq from 1988 to 1992 and 1995 – 2008, a minor part of the SGS and ASU expedition to Hodja-Gur-Gur-Ata, a search team of 7, led by Vasilij Samsonov from Orenburg, methodically examined the 3 km long section of the 150–200 m high wall at the edge of the ridge above Boybuloq. They found several possible cave entrances, all located 30–50 m below the crest of the wall, and the most promising proved to be the one marked as ČB-15 (Chul-Bair 15), at an elevation of 3522 m, 25 m below the top of the ridge. 400 meters far and 70 meters deep the team stopped at an impassable fissure which they eventually broke. In 2016 a team of 7, from the Baysun-Tau 2016 expedition widened the passage at −70 m, descended 15 m a hall. It continued with a narrow but tall meander (3–30 m), which turned into an inclined and slippery one. After a 40 m shaft and a series of problematic passages they reached a small stream which led, as a tributary, to a wider and higher meander with a larger stream. Soon the lack of time forced them to return. The cave, deepened to 234 m and prolonged to 1089 m, with more left unsurveyed, was renamed to Višnevskij cave. It steadily descended in the direction of Boybuloq.

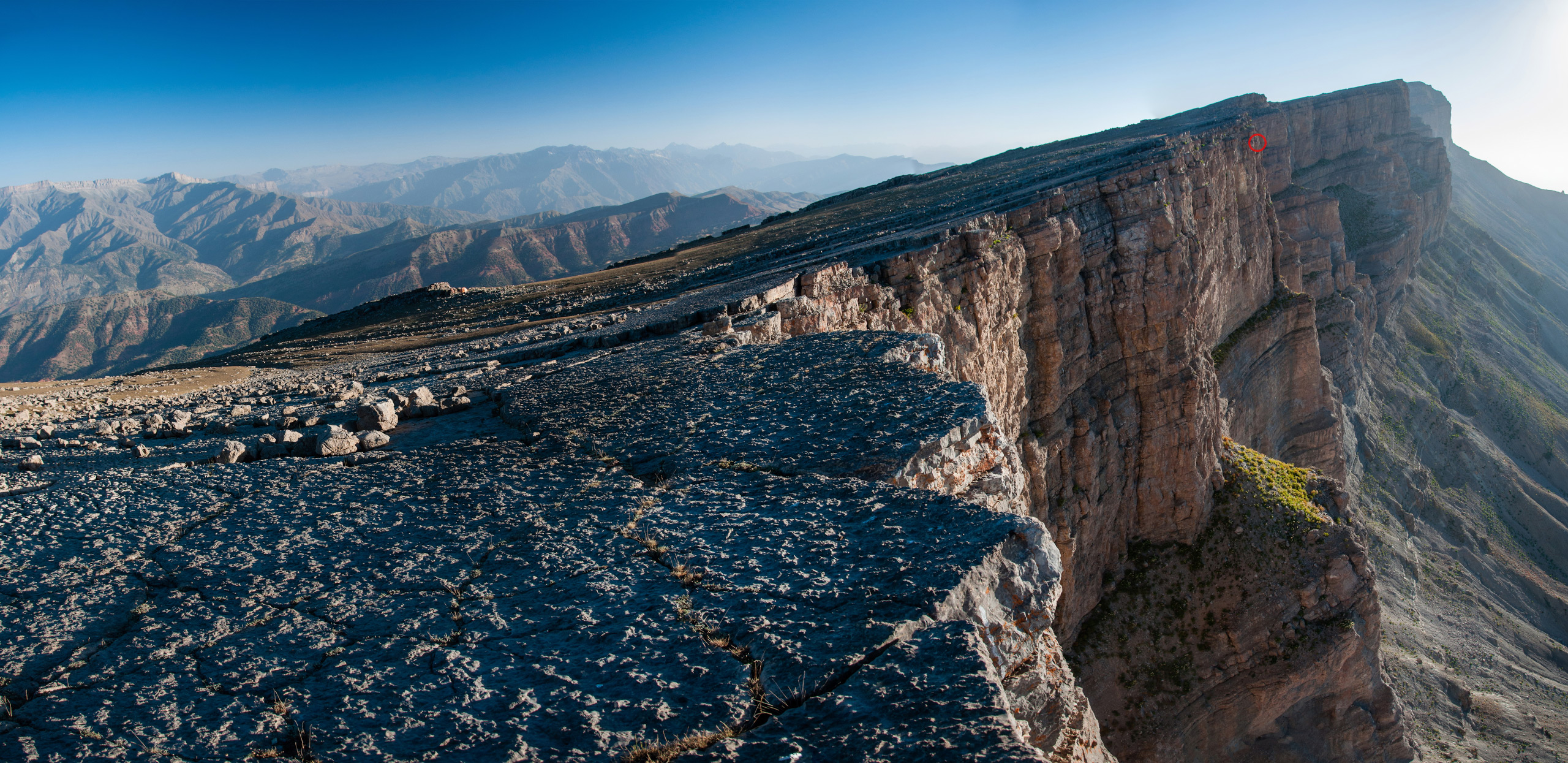
Chul-Bair ridge with marked entrance to the Višnevskij cave

In 2017 a 10-person expedition from SGS and ASU set camp above the cave, 3550 m above sea level. They set up the underground camp at −168 m from where S. Terehin and A. Abdjušev made their way through the cave till the siphon at −735 m, in one go. The new part is a 50 cm wide corridor with a stream, with 4 unexplored tributaries. The survey reached 586 m in depth and 2800 m in length, still descending steadily towards Boybuloq, at an angle of the surface, 19 degrees, at a distance from the surface of 70 – 100 m. A survey of the ridge surface was also made, for the 3D cave model. Part of the team scouted for more cave entrances on the ridge plateau and along the wall, to shorten the long crawl to the cave bottom. Several caves were found, but none connected to Višnevskij. In 2018 an international team, 14 people from Russia, 8 from France, and 3 from Switzerland set off to explore the Višnevskij, Boybuloq, Lunnaja, and ČB-5 caves. In the cave two new camps were set up, at −350 m and −600 m. Close to the latter, in a side tributary which continued in the ascending direction, a small gallery, a hint of a possible link with Boybuloq, was discovered. In the canyon which leads to Boybuloq, dinosaur footprints were found, while in the New branch of this cave a new survey was made to better estimate the connecting point with Višnevskij. 2500 m of new tunnels were mapped in Višnevskij and Lunnaja caves but the siphon bypass was not found.

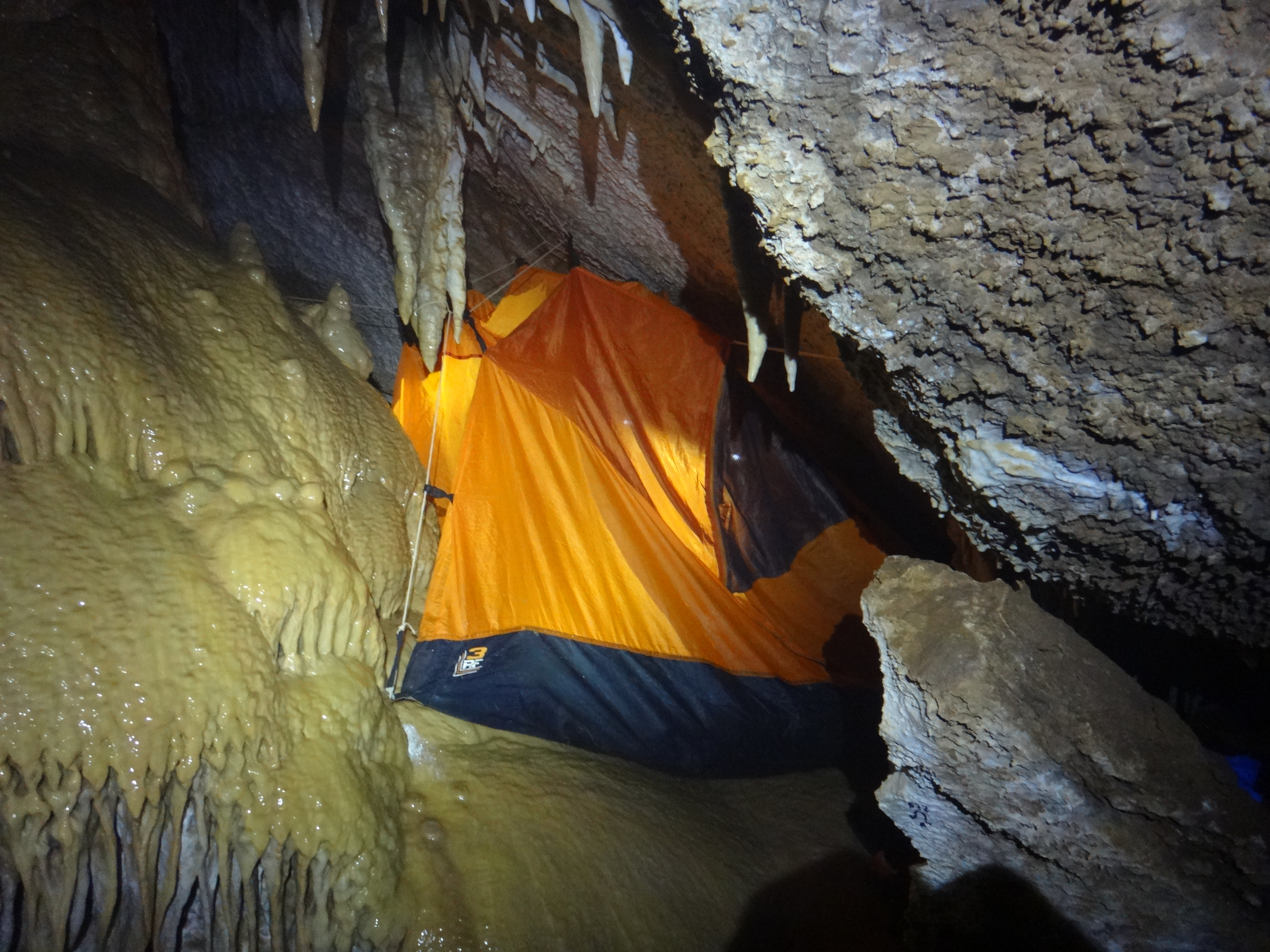
Camp Gnezdo (Nest) at −1049 m, 2019

In 2019 it was difficult to assemble the expedition as there was no clear continuation, but when cavers from Moscow and Irkutsk also joined in, a group of 15 gathered. Four: E. Sakulin, P. Kovešnikov, A. Janina, and A. Minogin departed to the bottom, to find an eventual continuation in the ascending tributary at −600 m. But on the first day at the bottom, Sakulin and Janina crawled through a narrow, half-flooded passage and found a siphon bypass. Other plans were scrapped and the team, reinforced with E. Rybka, V. Samsonov, and V. Loginov (called through a phone connection to the surface), set off to the new part. A wide meander with a stream at the bottom continued until the stream disappeared below the dripstone floor in a narrow passage, above which the "Big gallery" began. A low crawl with a wet clay floor followed. After two hours the "Big Collapse Hall" opened up, followed by a meander with a small stream, a passage, and a beautifully colored meander named "Amber River". It joined a larger inflow, most likely the main stream which disappeared before the "Big Gallery". On a shelf under the ceiling of the junction hall, "Aquapark", the last camp was set up. An even larger meander followed, and several 10 m pits. Because of lack of time and rope, the party stopped on top of another 20 m shaft, after which one more pit was visible. The cave ran steadily in the direction of a cascade of pits in the New Branch of Boybuloq. It was deepened to 1131 m and prolonged to 8004 m.

Cave profile of Boybuloq and Višnevskij caves with surface

The deepest point in Višnevskij was 50 m above and 200 m horizontally apart from Boybuloq. The eventual connection, at around 2,300 metres (7,500 ft) a. s. l. would make a cave with a depth of 2,033 metres (6,670 ft). In 2020 the plans for a large expedition to the Višnevskij cave were scrapped because of the COVID-19 pandemic, while a smaller expedition is foreseen for August 2021.

== Vižaj ==
Vižaj (pron. Veezhay) is a river in the extreme north of Sverdlovsk Oblast, flowing east, a right tributary of Lozva, in a mostly uninhabited land of taiga, subarctic coniferous forest. It was also a nearby village, from which the Djatlov ski party set off on their fatal trip. As of 2021, it is the main home area where SGS conducts cave exploration.

Since the 1970s the main purpose of SGS was to explore the great caves, in the beginning of the Western Caucasus, from the 1980s in Central Asia, where a world depth record could be reached. For training of cave climbing, descent and ascent in shafts, trips were organized to caves of Bashkiriya National Park, especially the Sumgan cave, 700 km to the southwest of Ekaterinburg. The cave is 10 km long, 130 m deep, one of the largest caves of the Urals. It was widely believed that there could be no large, technically demanding caves on the eastern slope of this mountain ridge. Until 2007, it was not known that the north of the Sverdlovsk Oblast (Ekaterinburg is located in its south) could be interesting, as far as speleology is concerned. The main cause was the remoteness of the region, but also its closedness, as until 1990 the wider area to the north of Ivdel, including Vižaj, there were many prison camps.

Map of Taëžnaja cave

Several caves were known on the Lozva and two caves on the river Northern Tošemka, none on the river Vižaj, until 2007. In the 1970s, geologist Aleksandr Bikbaev carried out a hydrogeological survey, associated with bauxite ore deposits. He discovered the presence of a large underground aquifer, and places of partial absorption of the Sev. Tošemka and Vižaj waters. Fishermen and tourists reported riverbank ponors and numerous karst springs. In July 2007, two SGS cavers, during the rafting down the Vižaj, discovered a riverbank cave they named after V. Tatiščev, a historian who described the Kungur Ice Cave in the Urals. In June 2008, the Vižajskij kamen cave with a 20-meter entrance shaft was found and systematic exploration of the area began. In 2009 six expeditions followed, by SGS cavers, and cavers from Pervouralsk, Verhnjaja Pyšma, Perm, Kungur, Naberežnye Čelny, Tjumen, Čeljabinsk and Novosibirsk, led by Evgenij Curihin. 67 new caves with a total length of over 6 km were discovered, till 2021 the number increased to 130, total length to 12 km. The formation of many caves is associated with the underground flow of the river, they often contain anomalously large halls (up to 80 m in diameter), caused by a very thick layer of limestone. Considerable depth of the lakes in caves suggested the presence of large underwater spaces, explored since 2011 by SGS divers.

Taëžnaja cave extended profile

The most important are Severnaja and Taëžnaja caves. Severnaja, 3510 m long and 84 m deep, is the largest cave in the Sverdlovsk Oblast and the entire eastern side of the Urals. In it, the bones of Pleistocene fauna were found – of rhinoceros, bison, mammoth, bear, reindeer, and horse. Taëžnaja, morphologically the most interesting cave, was 2050 m long and 101 m deep, the deepest cave in the Sverdlovsk Oblast. From April 2012 to February 2021 12 divings were made in the cave, 3 underwater halls were explored. The biggest is the Kiselev passage, 46 m deep and 200 meters long, with two loop tunnels at the side, named Canyon 1 and Canyon 2. It leads to the Funnel hall and the Third hall. Kiselev passage is also one of the largest underwater spaces in Russian caves.

SGS presidents
		Name, patronym and surname	Years
Jurij Evgen'evič Lobanov	1961–1964	Aleksandr Vladislavovič Plastinin	1989–1993
Aleksandr Filippovič Ryžkov	1964–1966	Andrej Aleksandrovič Karpov	1993–1997
Jurij Evgen'evič Lobanov	1966–1971	Dmitrij Olegovič Bajanov	1997–1999
Sergej Ivanovič Golubev	1972–1978	Georgij Borisovič Sapožnikov	1999–2003
Vladimir Sergeevič Ageev	1978–1980	Dmitrij Nikolaevič Žuravlev	2003–2008
Igor' Sergeevič Novikov	1980–1985	Vadim Leonidovič Loginov	2008 –
Aleksandr Aleksandrovič Babanin	1985–1989		

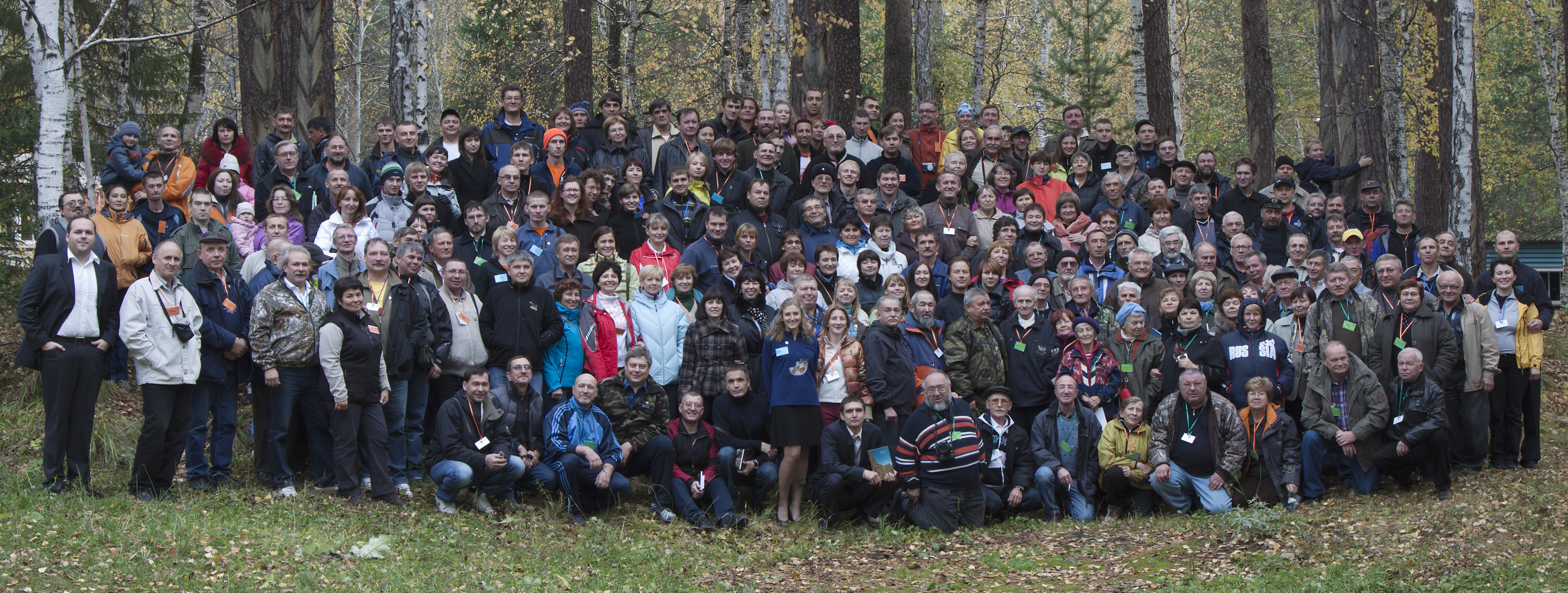
50th anniversary of SGS in 2011 – group photo of 209 members and guests in a birch forest, Kungurka recreational center near Ekaterinburg

== Gallery ==
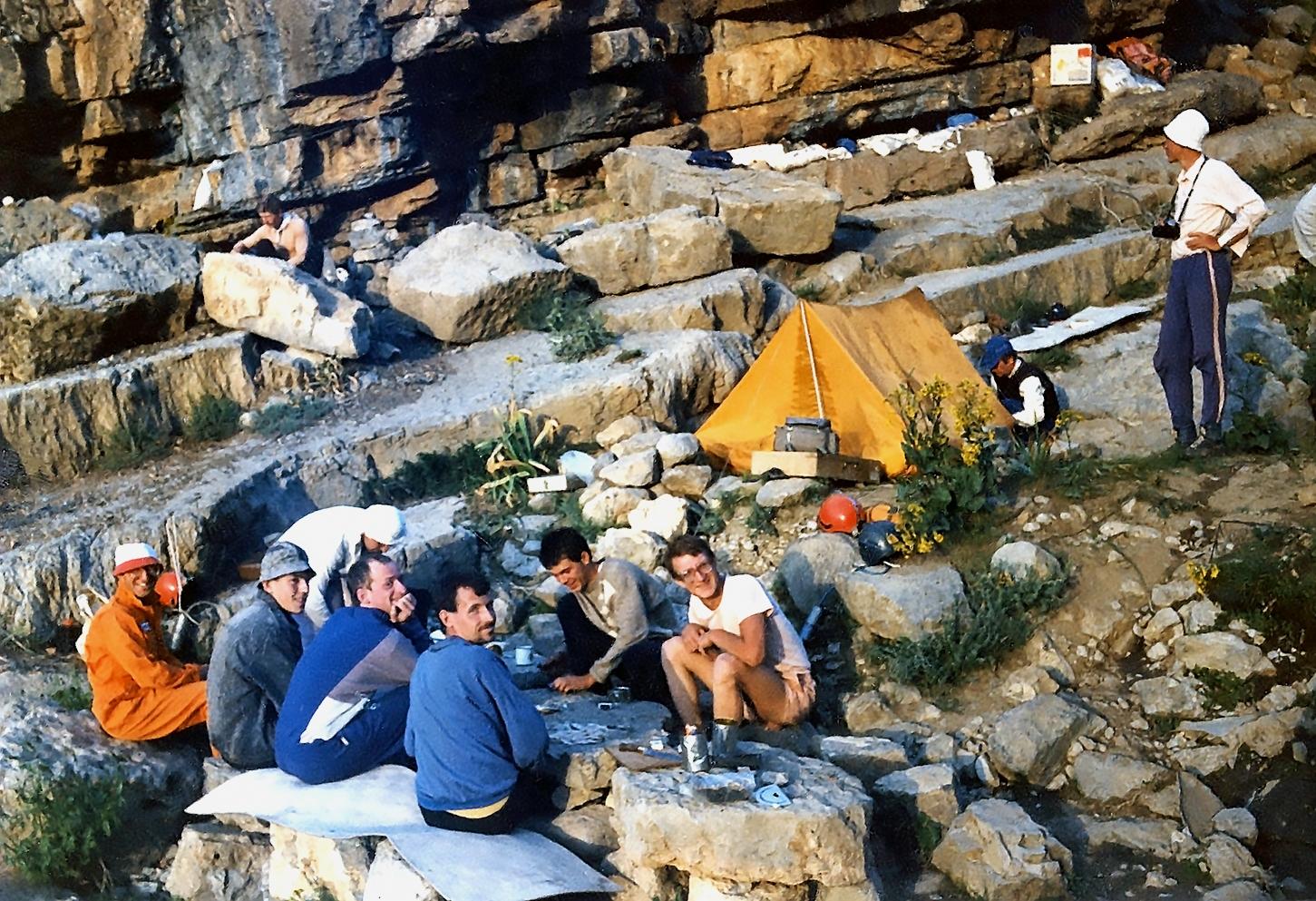
Base camp, Boybuloq 1992

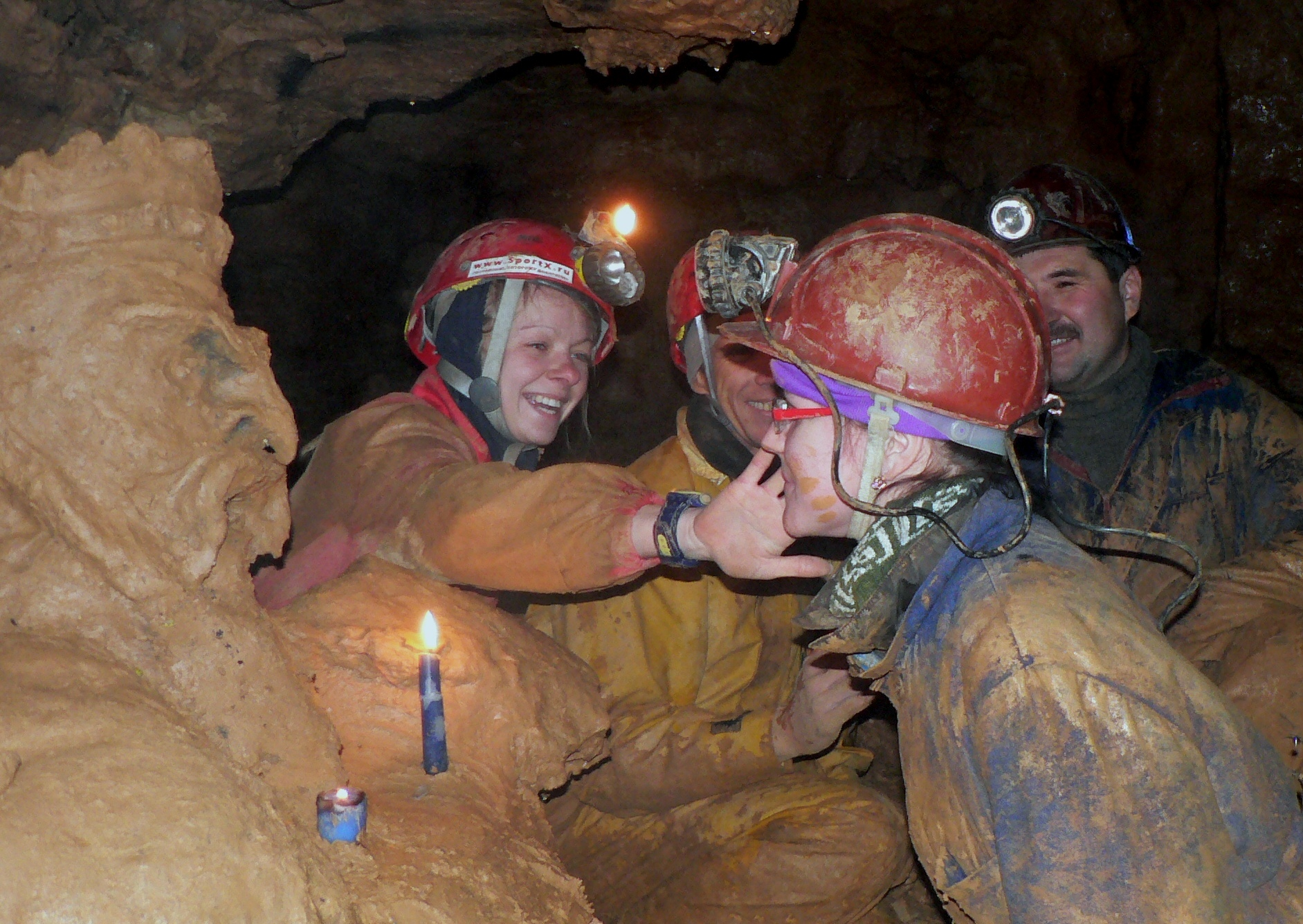
Initiation, Kizelovskaja 2006

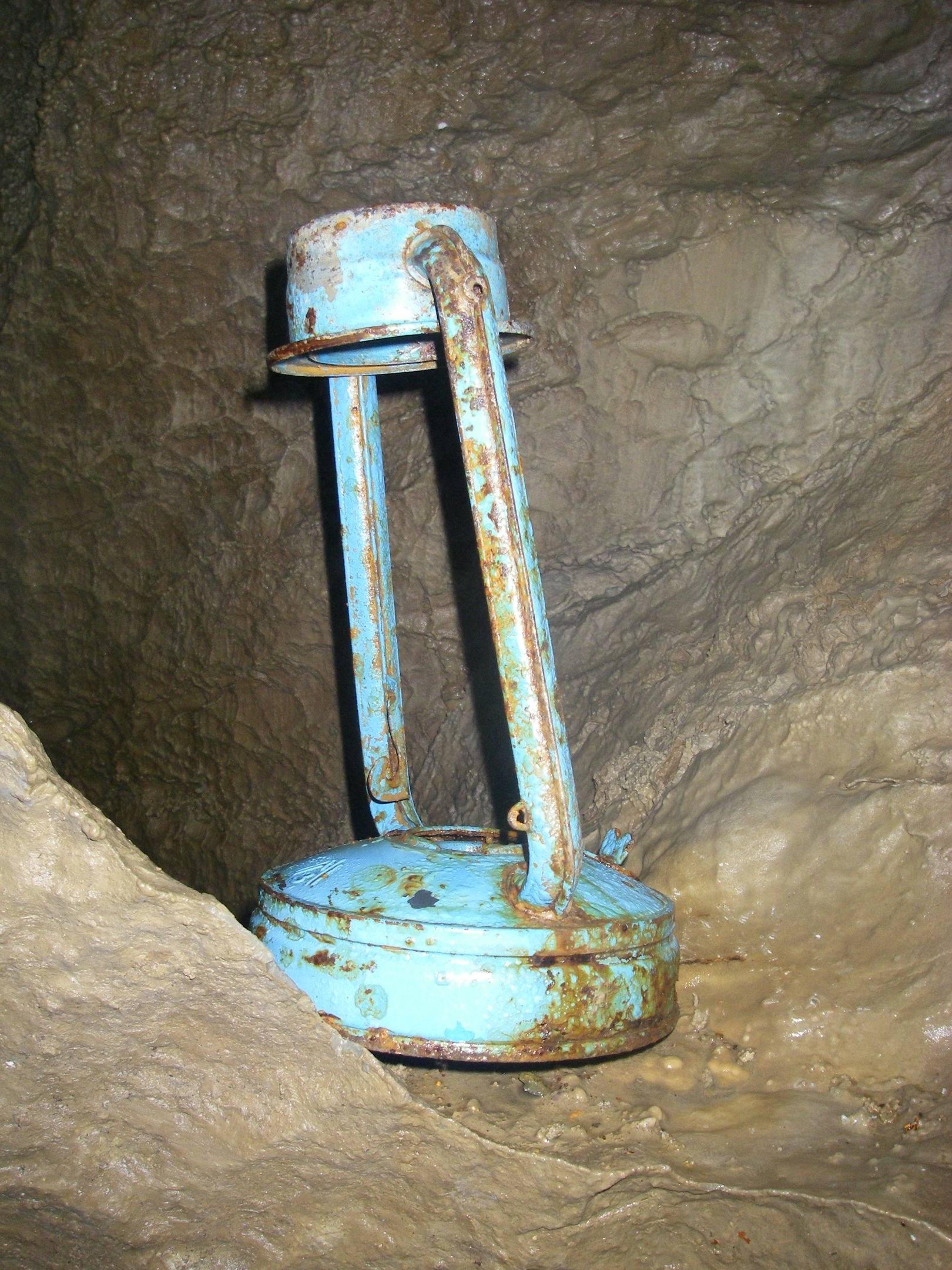
Mustafa's lamp, Boybuloq 2008

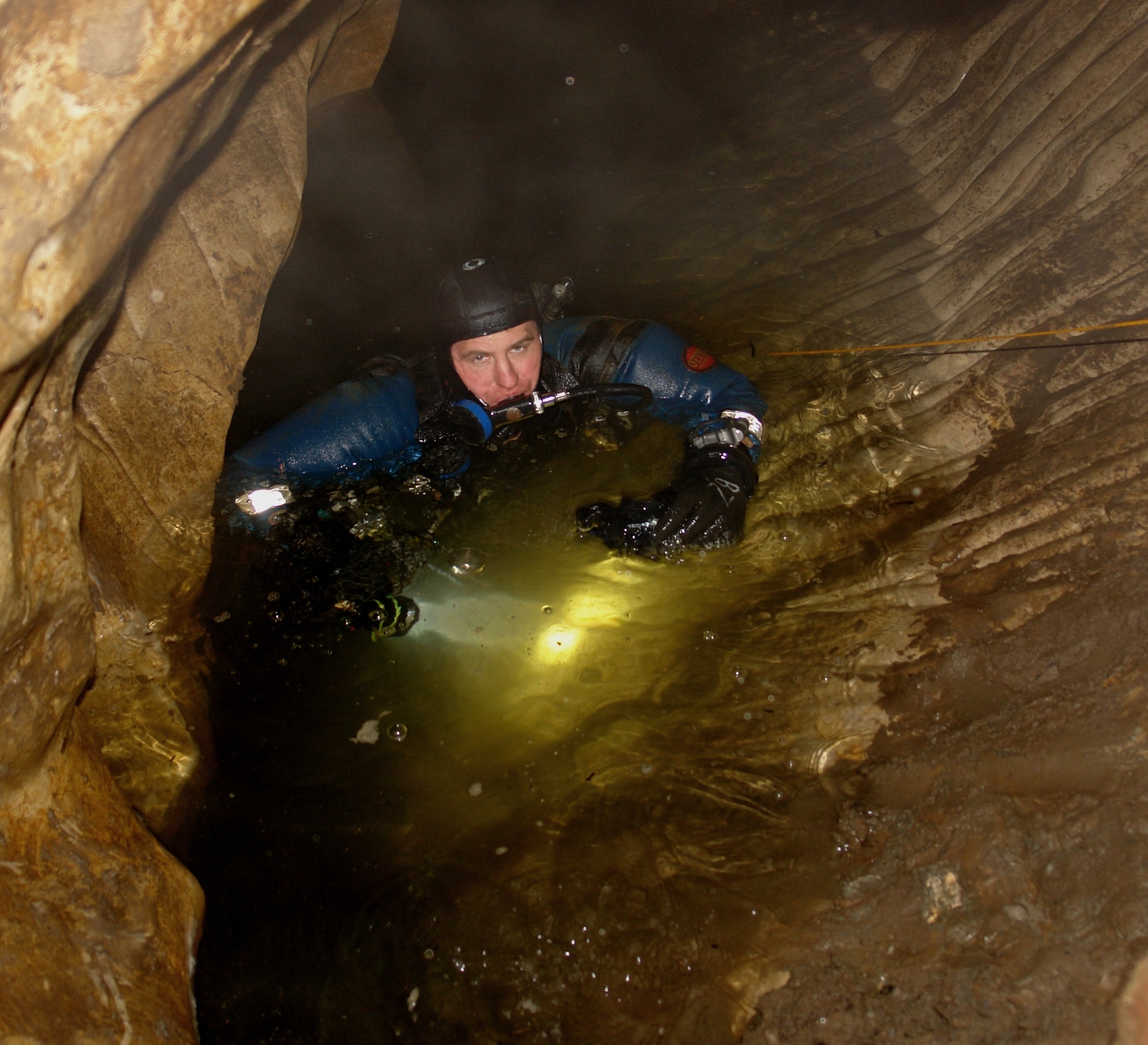
Returning diver, Vižaj 2009

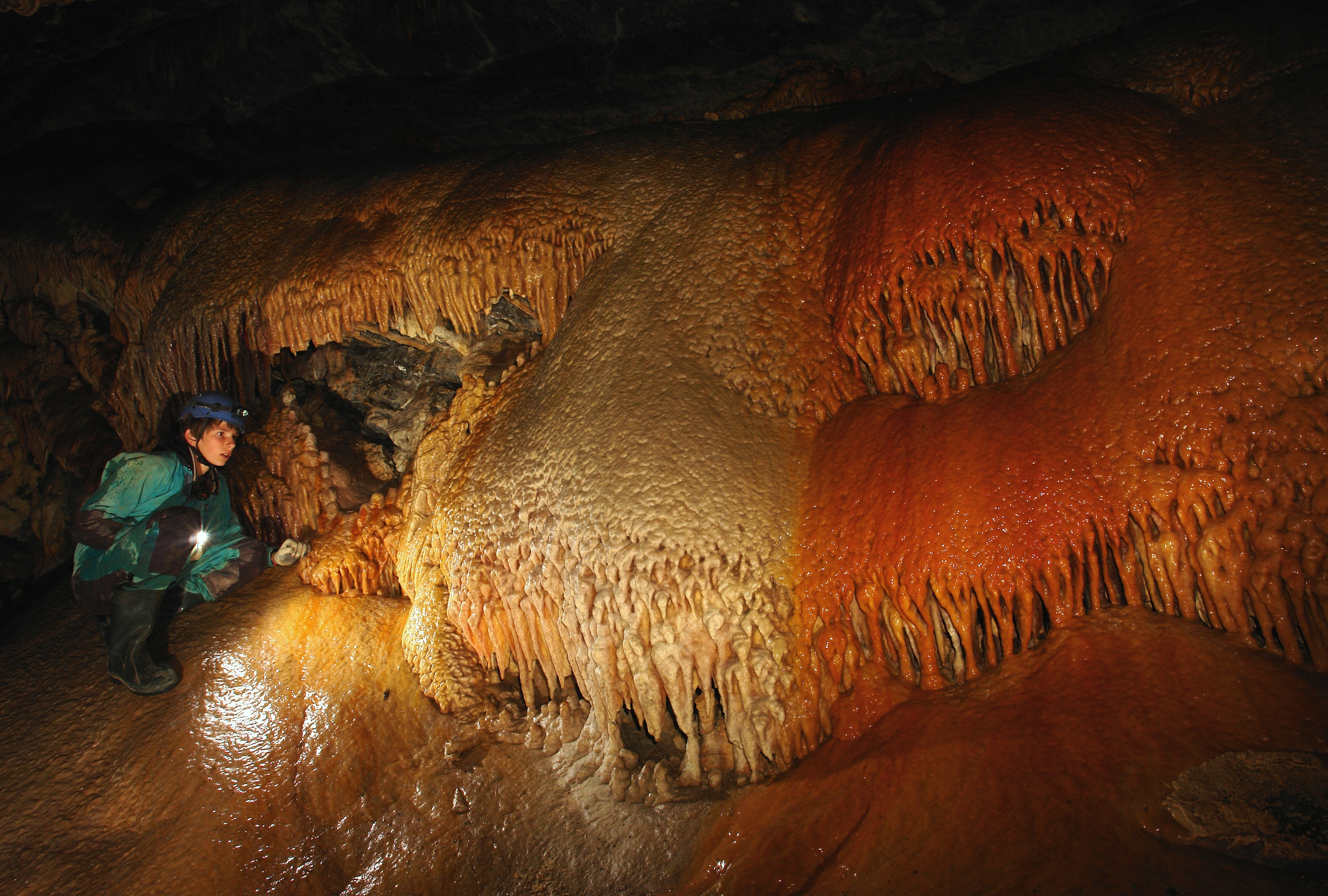
Cream and red, Tonnelnaja 2010

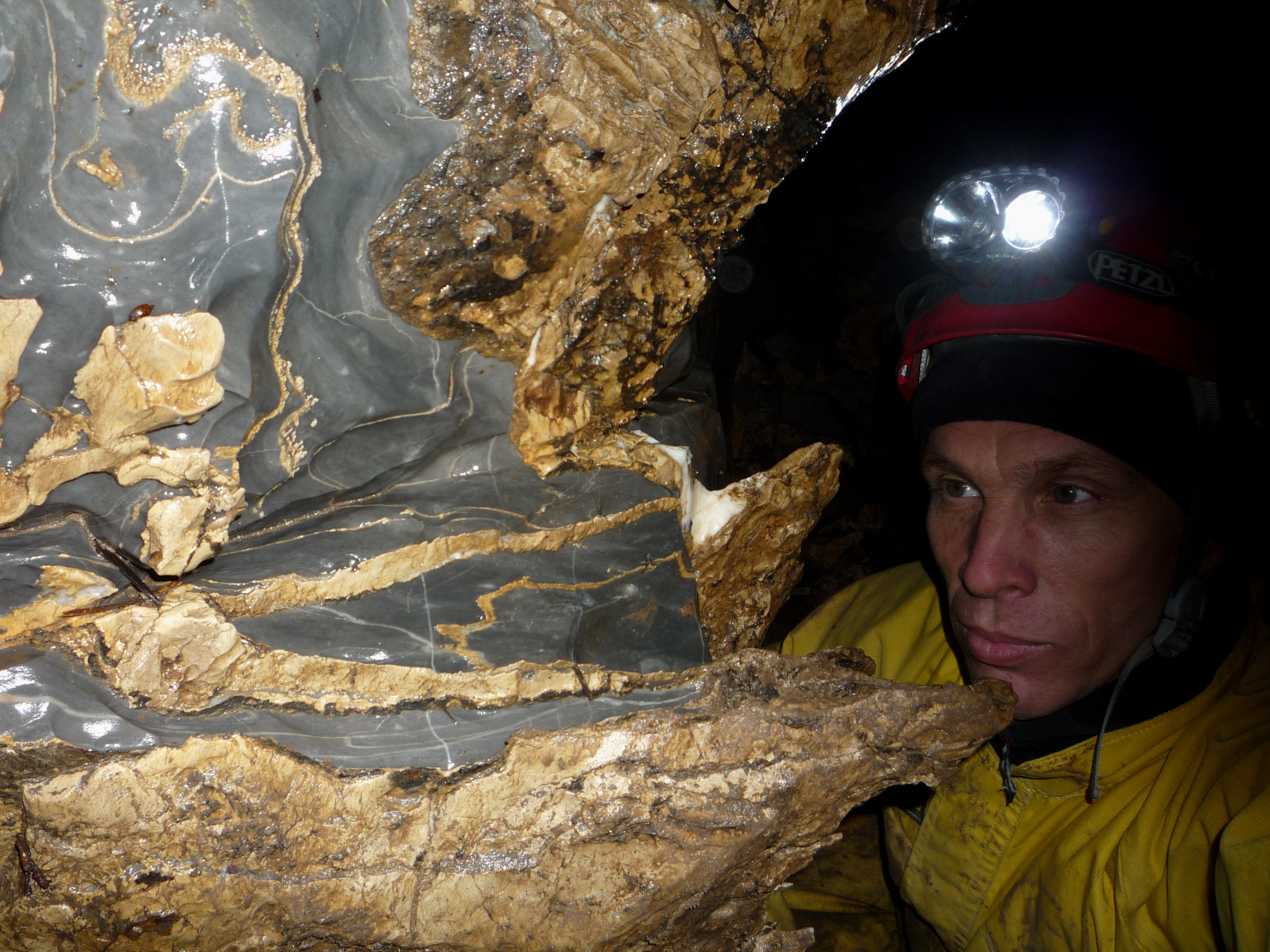
Rock intarsia, Bojcovskaja 2010

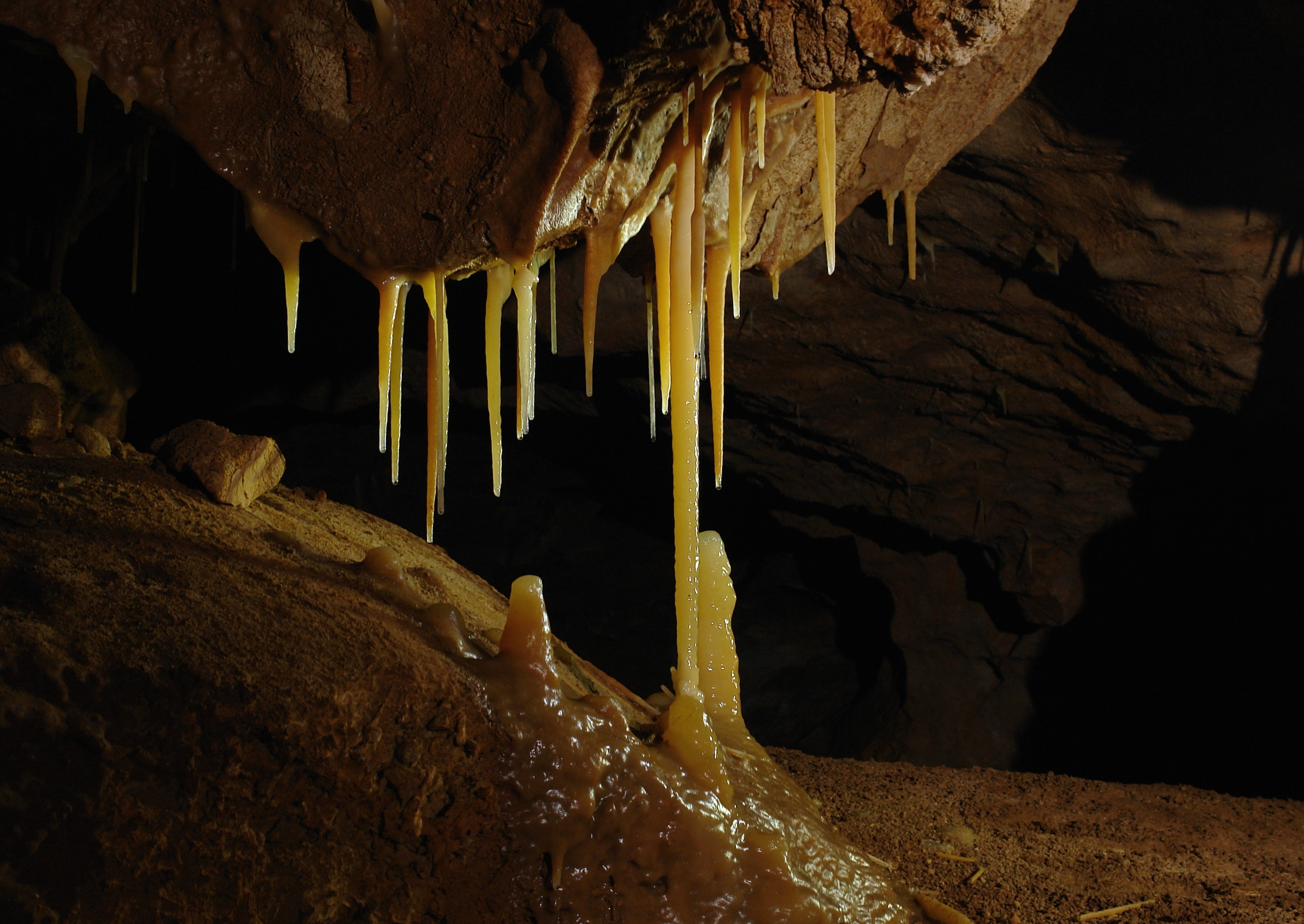
Translucency, Taëžnaja 2012

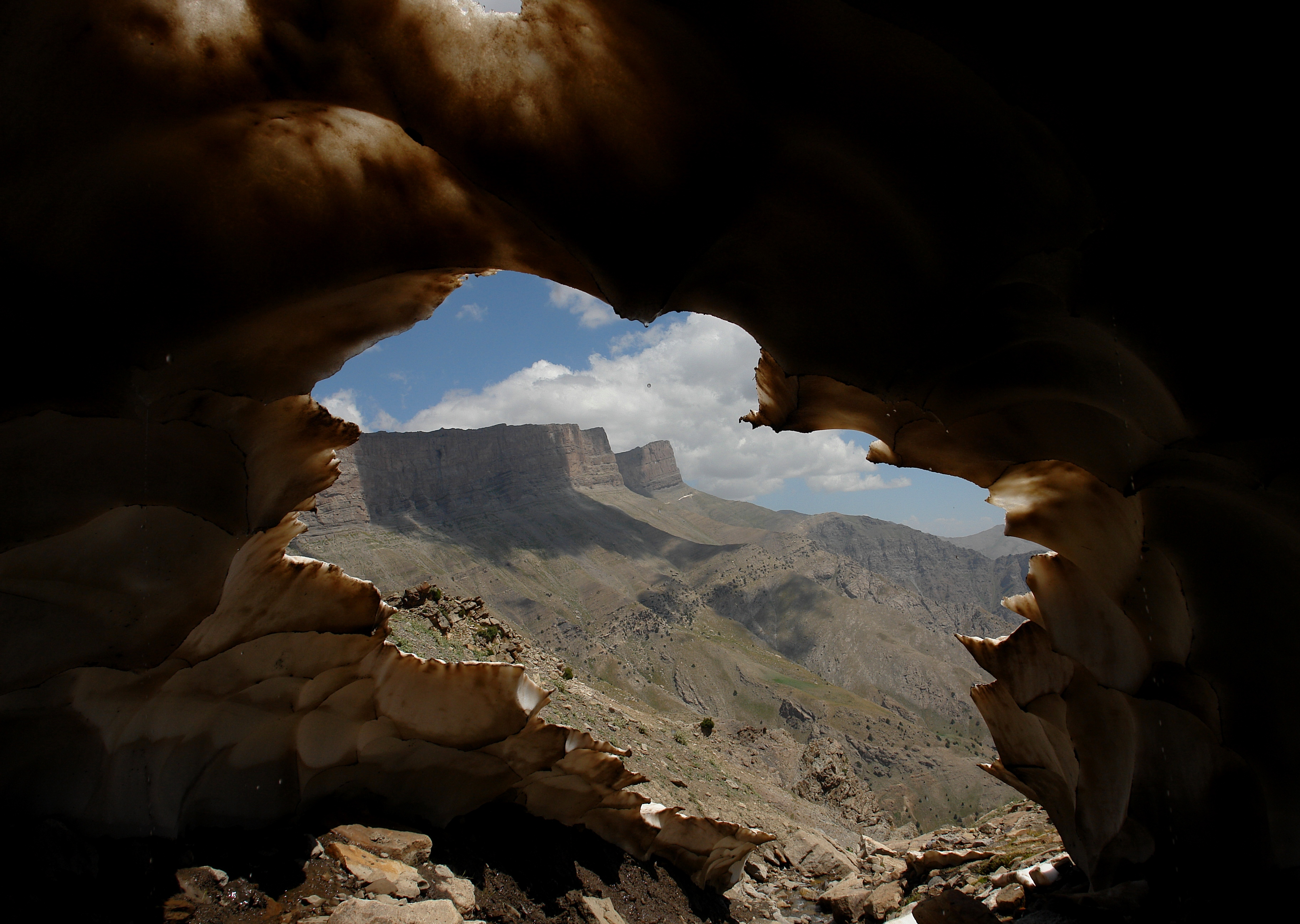
Ice cavern, Baysuntau 2012

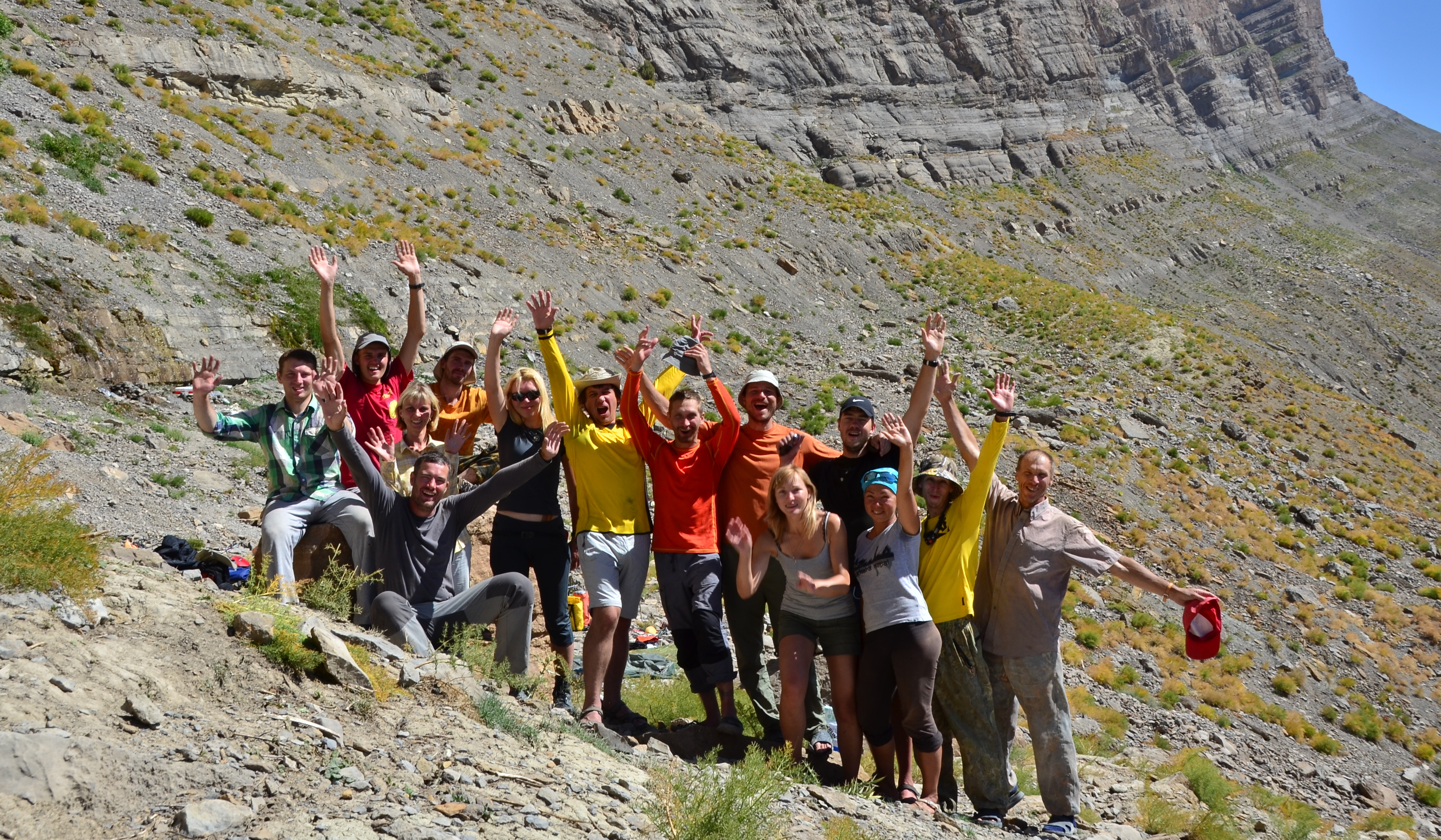
Team, Hodja-Gur-Gur-Ata 2015

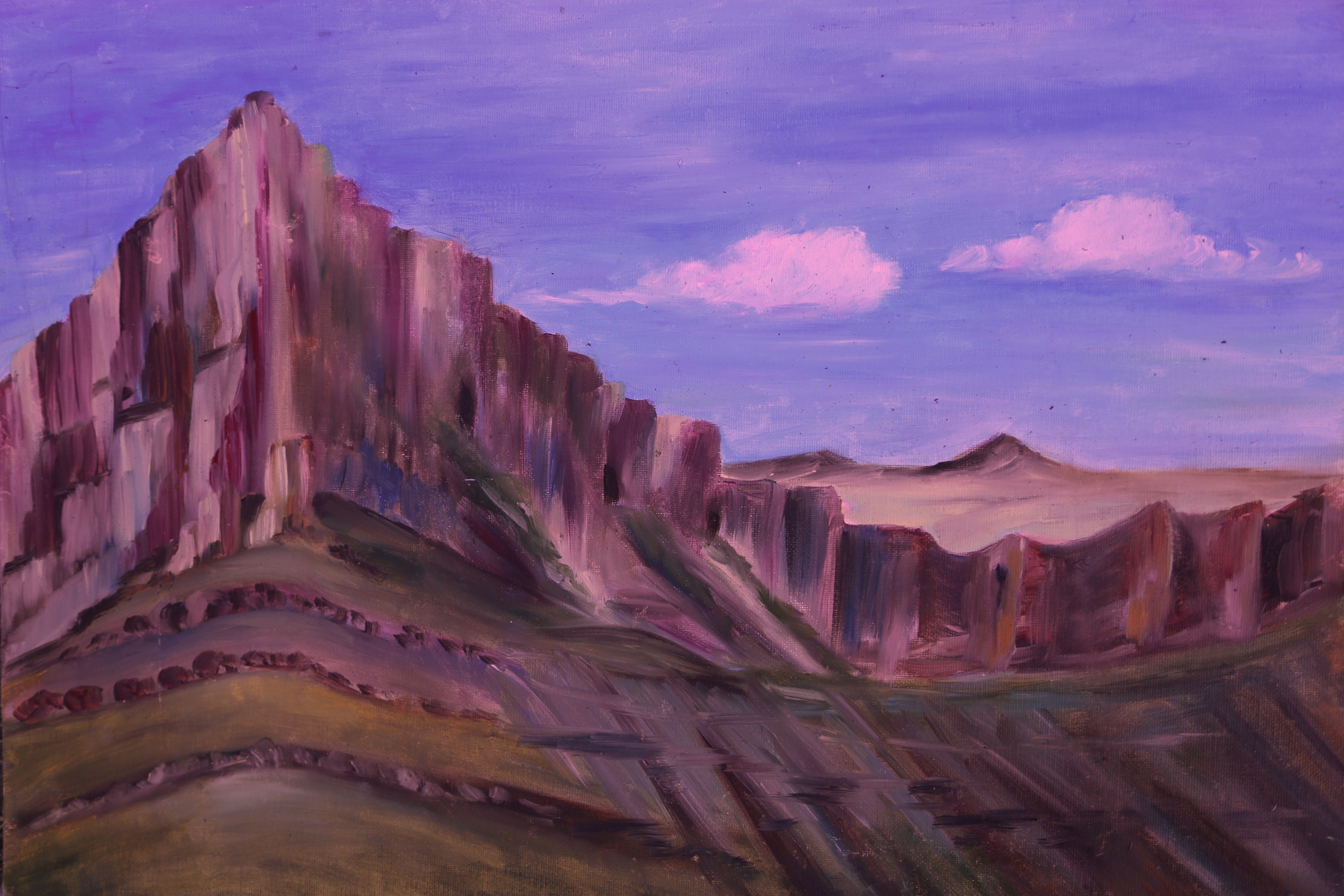
Cave mountain, oil/canvas 2015

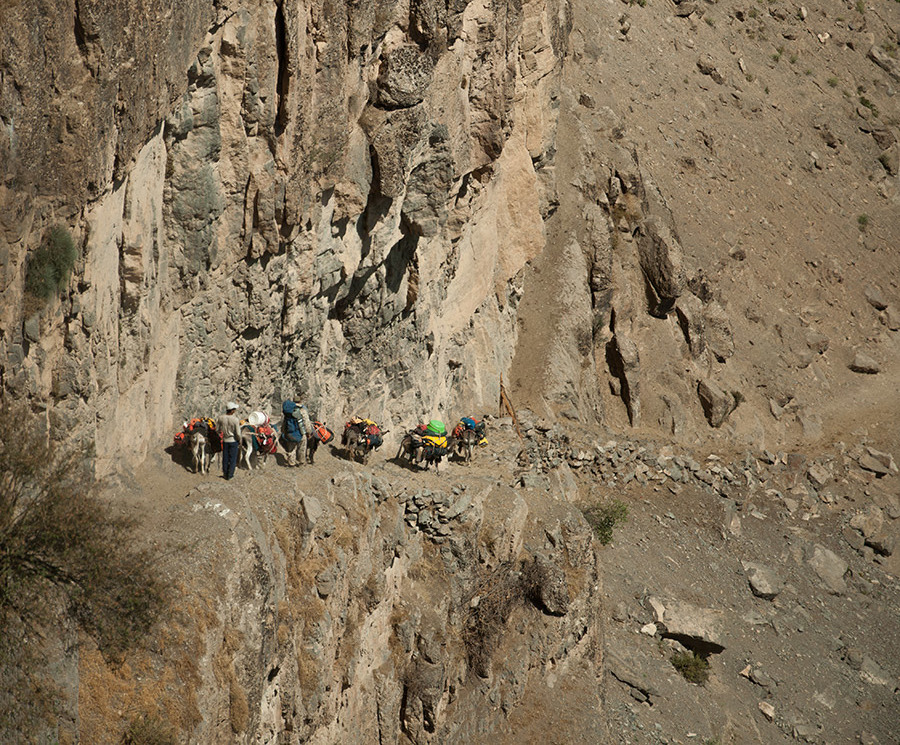
Pack donkeys, Višnevskij 2016

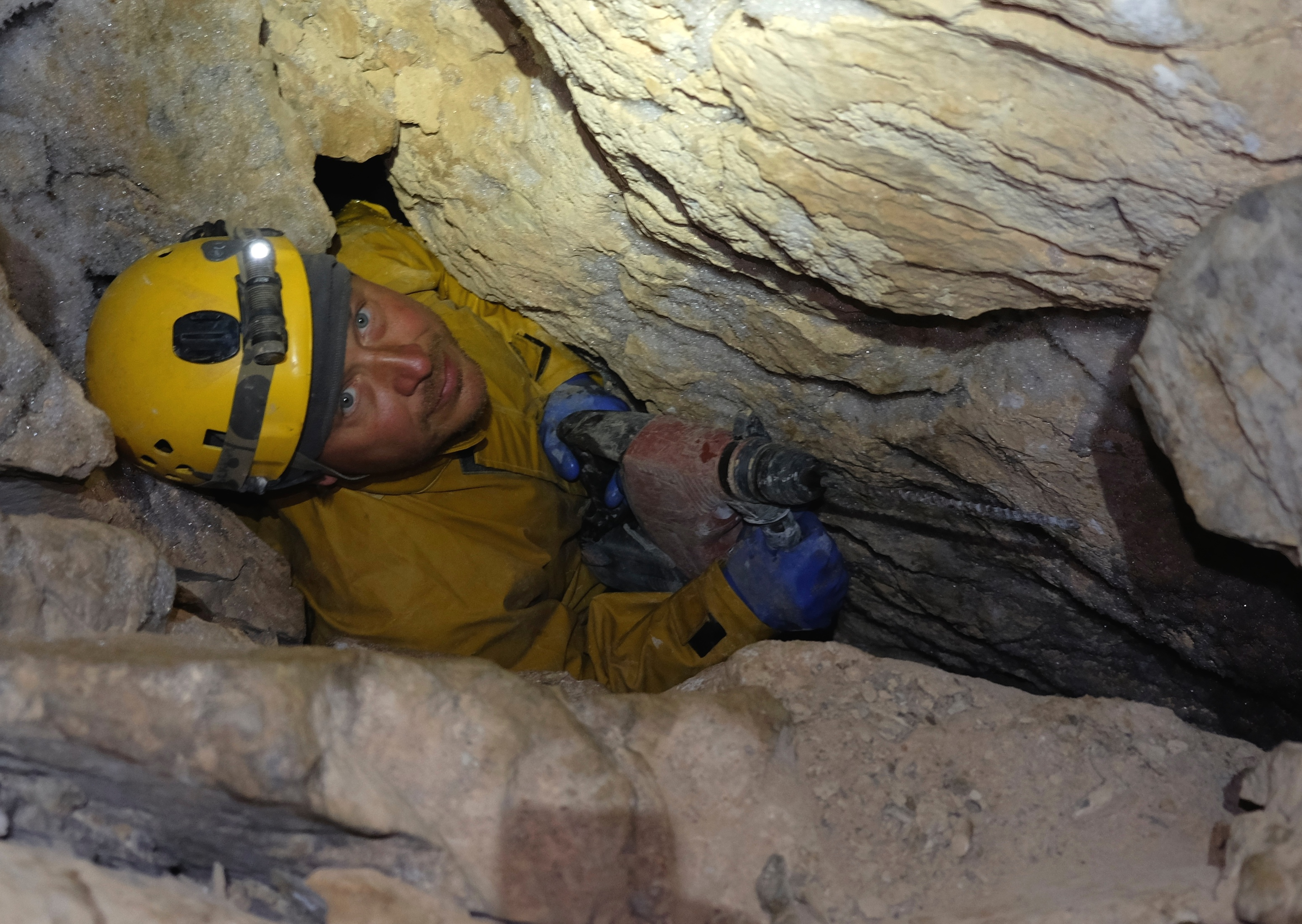
Meander widening, ČB-17 2017

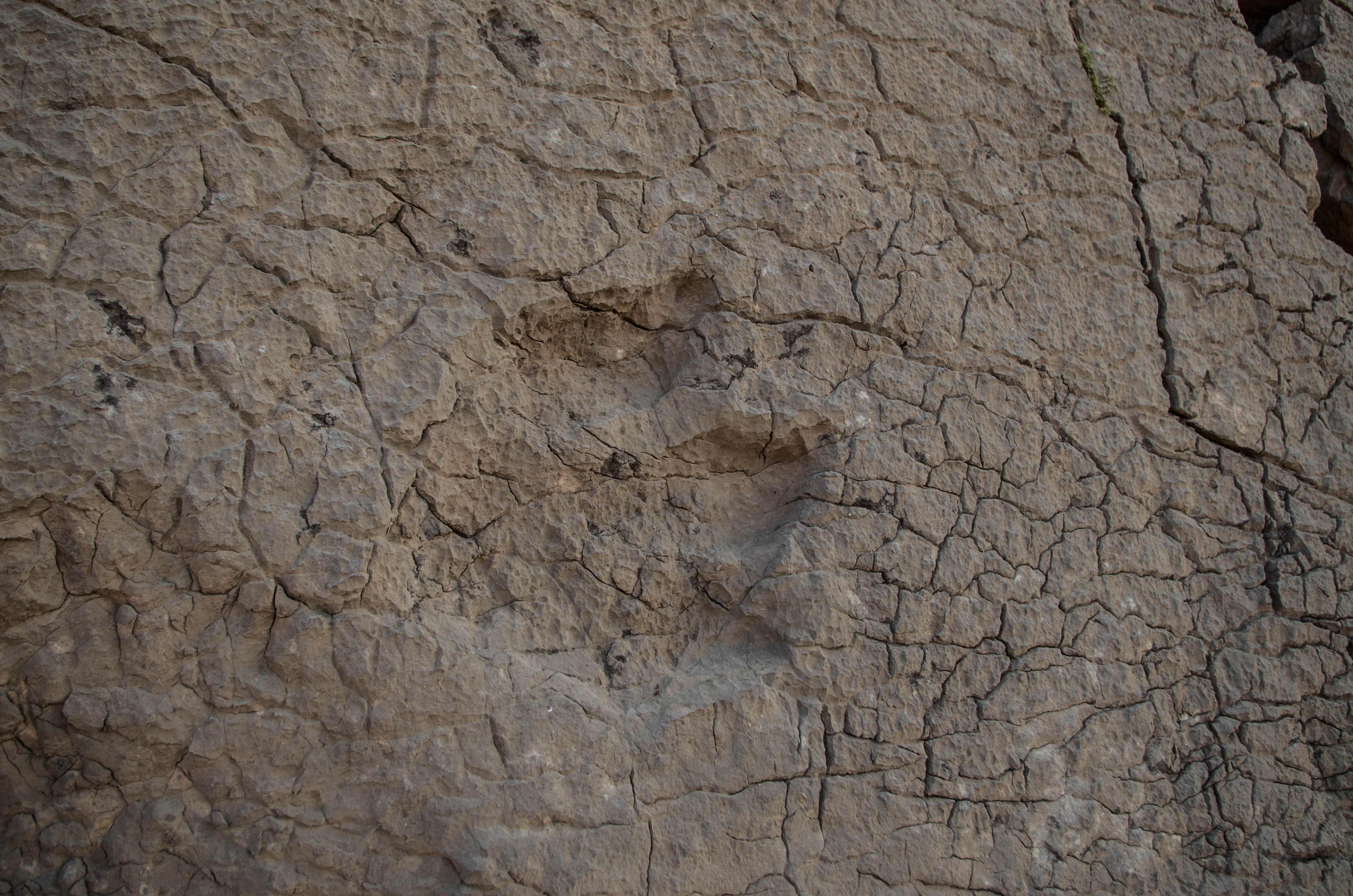
Dino footprint, Boybuloq 2018

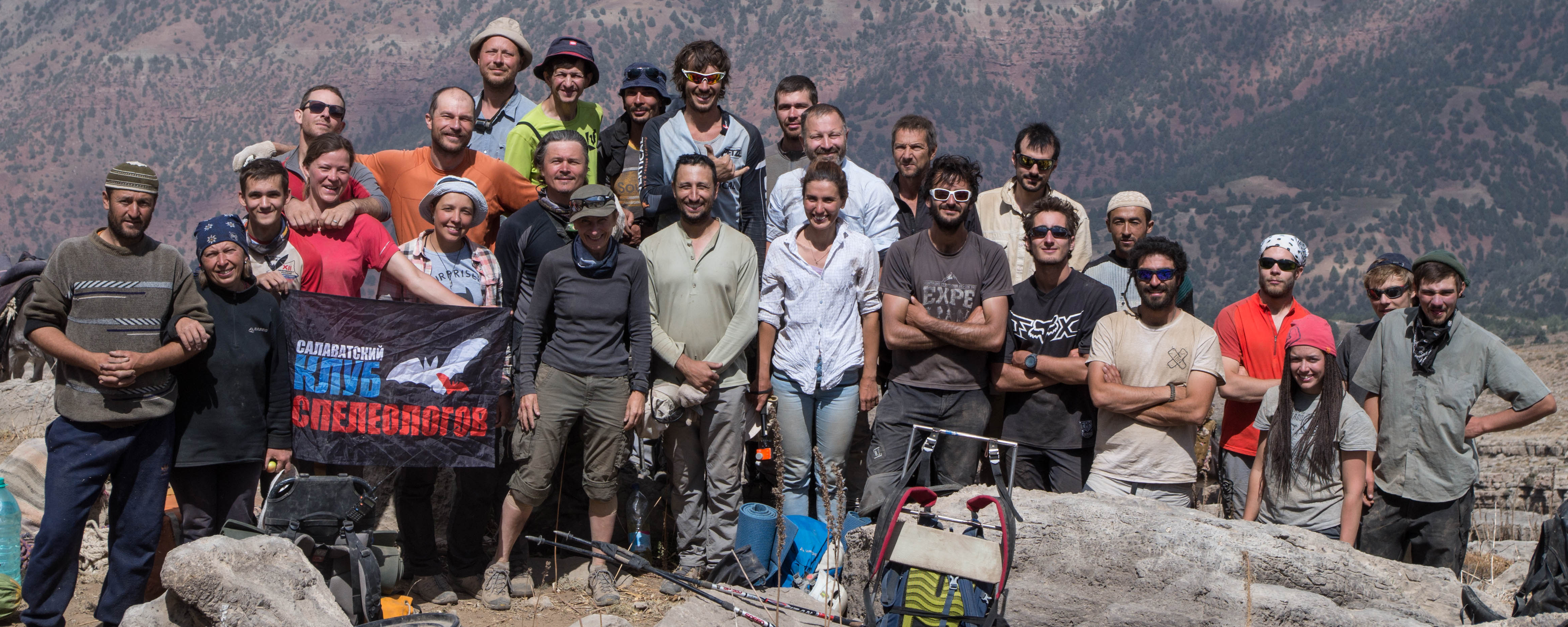
Boybul. & Višnevskij team, 2018

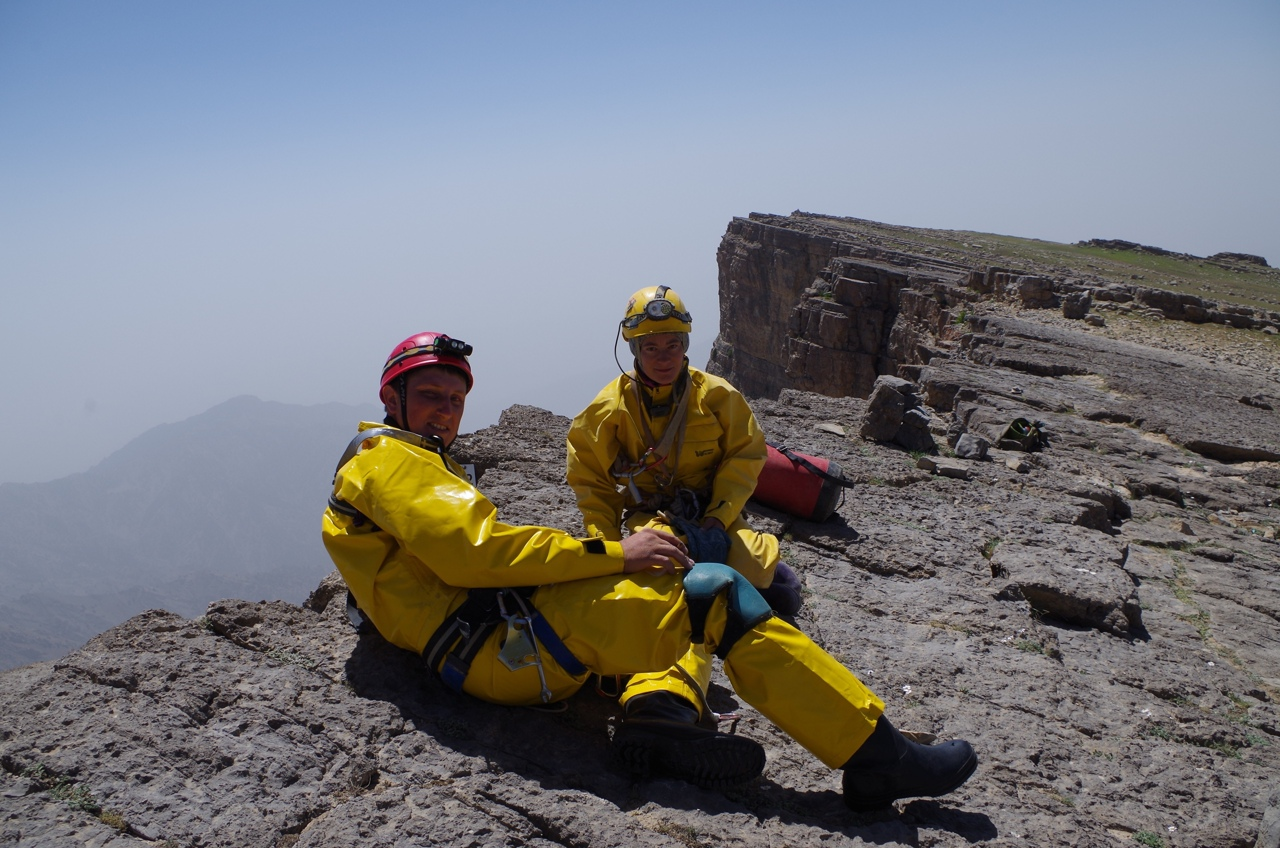
Precipice edge, Višnevskij 2019

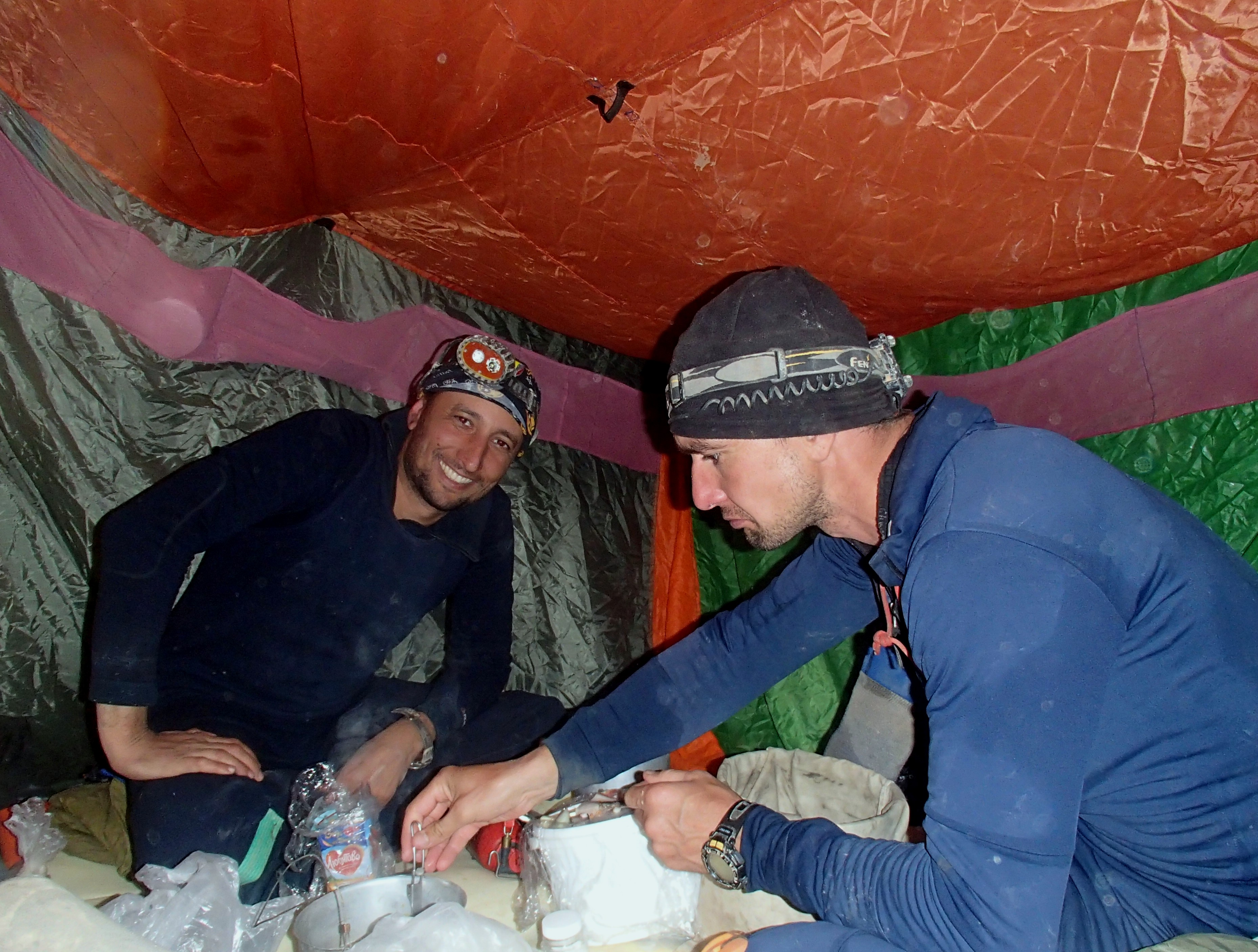
Lunch, -168 m, Višnevskij 2019

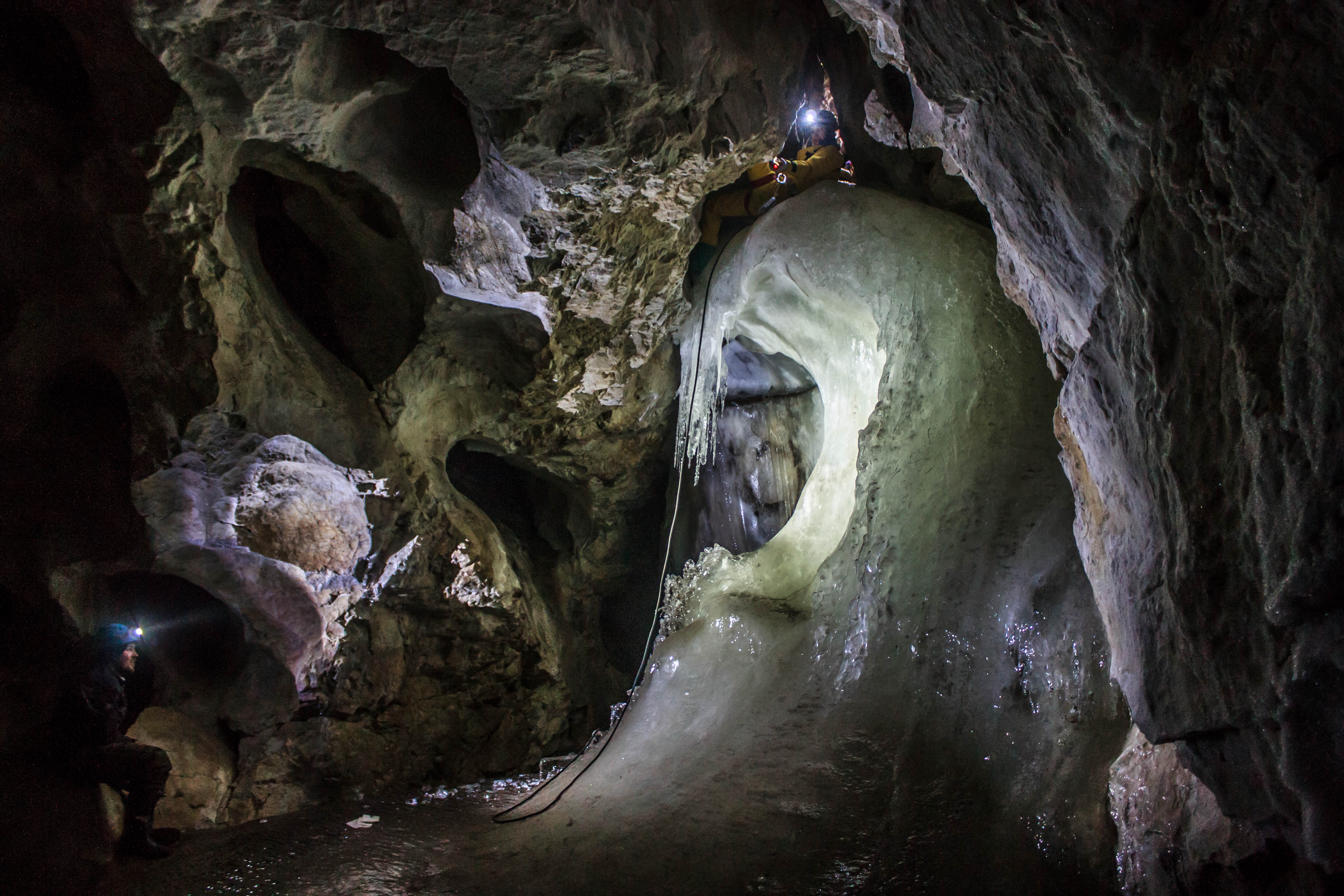
"Ice wave", Češirskij kot 2019

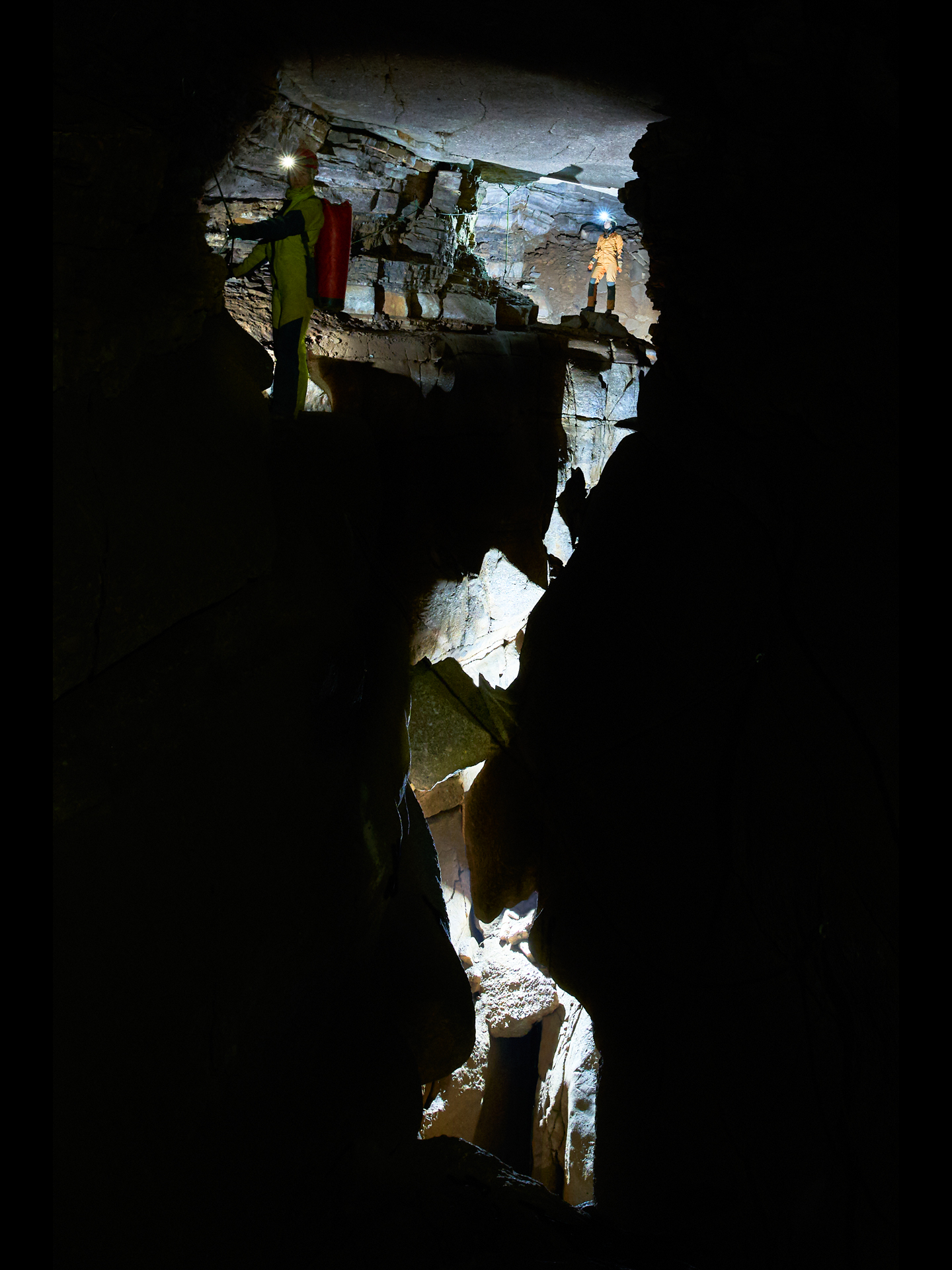
Shaft in darkness, Pobeda 2020

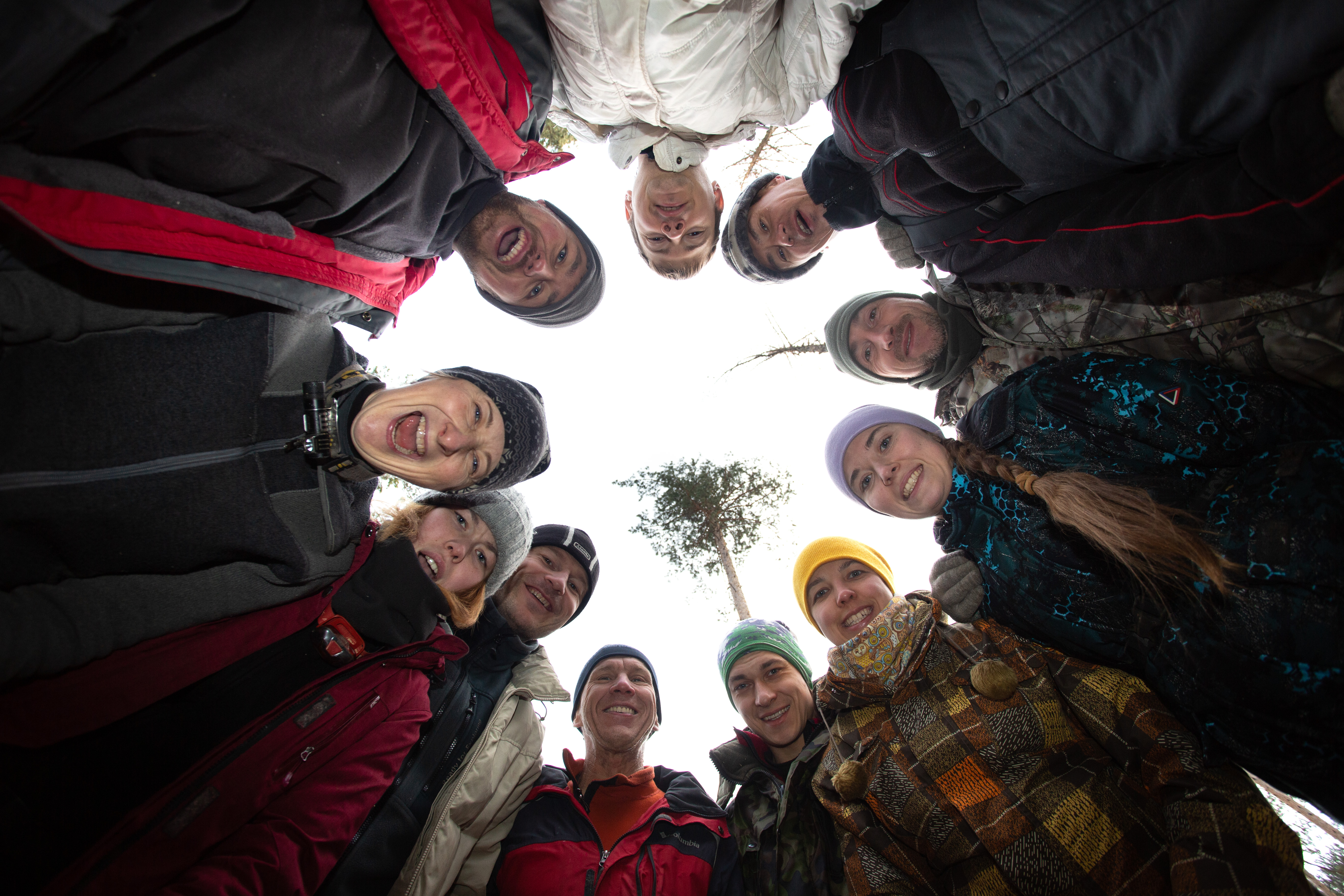
Circle of cavers, Vižaj 2020

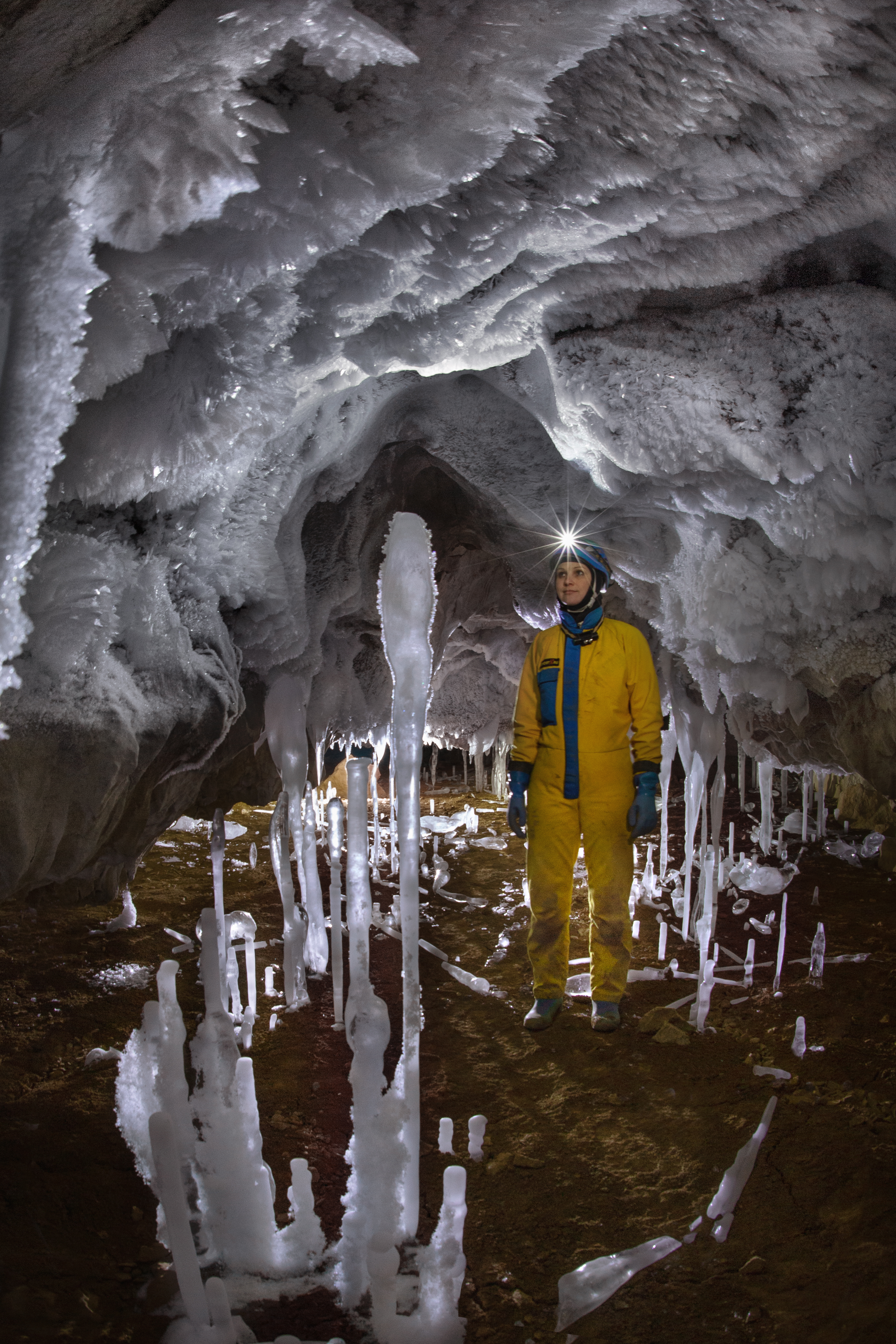
Sparkling cave ice, Vižaj 2021

== Publications ==
After 2000 a tradition of publishing a book at every important anniversary was established. It was usually in Russian and covered the results of the club's work. The first, SGS – 40 years, was published in 2001 by the Association of Speleologists of the Urals. Two more books followed, by Azimuth Publishing and SGS: SGS – The first semi-centennial. Caves. Events. People. in 2011 and SGS – In the spotlight in 2016 (in Russian and English. The same year a travelogue In the head of my sawdust ... by Sergej Kuklev, expedition participant, was published.

A 55-minute documentary film Asia forever, directed by Anna Loginova, premiered in December 2014.
