= Aleksandr Sergeyevich Vishnevsky =

Russian speleologist

Aleksandr Sergeevič Višnevskij
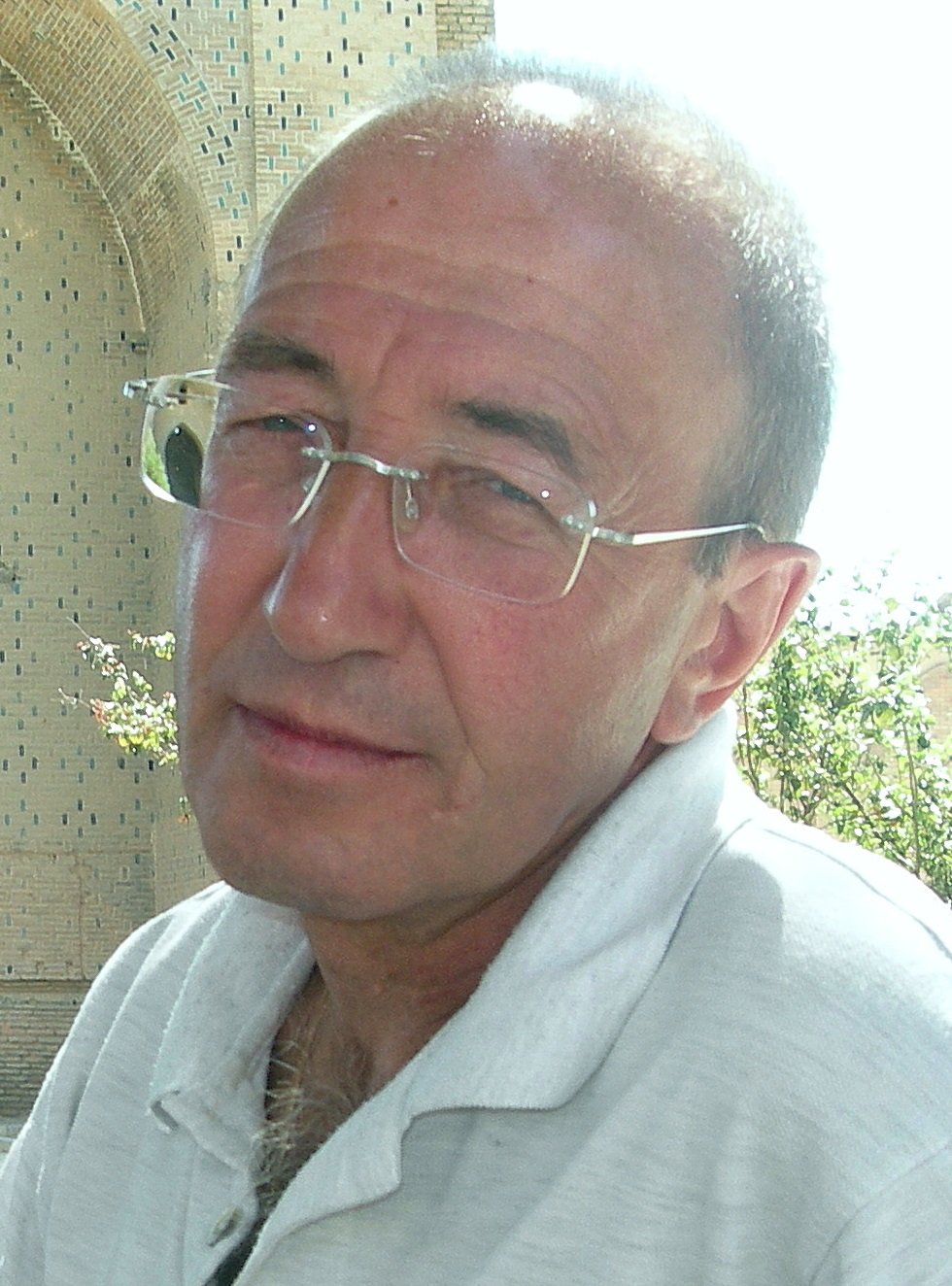
- in Samarkand, 2007
- Born: 18 August 1955; Sverdlovsk, Russia
- Died: 13 June 2015 (aged 59); Ekaterinburg
- Education: Ural State Pedagogical University
- Years active: 1974–2015
- Known for: speleology, high mountain caves
- Children: Ksenija A. Veršinina (born 1983)

Aleksandr Sergeyevich Vishnevsky (Russian: Александр Сергеевич Вишневский, Aleksandr Sergeevič Višnevskij, Alexander Sergeyevich Vishnevsky (Note: For greater accuracy Cyrillic names in this article are romanized according to Scientific transliteration of Cyrillic.)) (18 August 1955 – 13 June 2015) was a Russian speleologist, most known for his cave exploration work in the Urals and in Uzbekistan. After 2000 the latter area of his work became one of the speleology hotspots as it includes the Boybuloq, the deepest cave in Central and East Asia, and one of the deepest caves in the world.

== Early life, education and career ==
He was born into the family of Sergej Pantelejmonovič Višnevskij, a military civil engineer and builder of Kolcovo airfield in Sverdlovsk and of Marija Georgievna Višnevskaja, a chemist. After elementary and middle school in Sverdlovsk Višnevskij graduated, in 1978, at the Faculty of Geography and Biology of the Ural State Pedagogical University, also in Sverdlovsk. After graduation he followed the compulsory state assignment to teach geography at a school for troubled teenagers in Polunočnoe [Midnight Place], in the north of Sverdlovsk region. In February 1981 he was reassigned to a middle school in the village Novoalekseevskoe, close to Sverdlovsk, in the same capacity. In 1984 he returned to Sverdlovsk, to work at the School of Advanced Studies in Tourism, from 1991 in the Speleocenter travel agency, until he opened Al'pur, sports and recreation store, in 1995.

== Speleology ==
In high school Višnevskij got interested in caves and speleology. In 1973, as a student of geography, he traveled a lot in the Urals with SGS (Ekaterinburg Speleo Club), to which he was accepted as a member in 1974. After graduation in 1978, during his years as a teacher of geography he organized speleology courses and educated several generations of young speleologists. In 1984 he returned to his hometown and began to participate in the activities of tourist and speleological organizations of the USSR. He was one of the founders of the ASU (Association of Speleologists of the Urals, established in 1989), and its first president. He also became a senior member of the Russian Geographical Society. In 1999 he served as the vicepresident of the Russian Union of Speleologists. Višnevskij participated in several scientific projects, he was involved in the development and application of new speleological equipment, such as single-rope technique.

He organized, headed or supervised regional and all-Soviet Union speleological expeditions and training events: in 1976 two speleo camps in Western Caucasus, in Fisht massif and in Alek massif, in 1977 an expedition to Optymistychna Cave in Ukraine and all-Union speleo camp in Alek massif, in 1978 7th conference on the speleotourism issues in Perm, speleo camps in Gubaha, Western Urals and at Lake Bajkal, in 1979 all-Union gathering of caving instructors in Western Caucasus, Alek massif, in 1980 speleo camp at the same location, in 1981 4th speleotechnics meeting of the cities of the Urals in Sverdlovsk, speleo camp on the Kirk Tau plateau and a cave search expedition to Čak-Čar, southwestern Gissar Range, both in Uzbekistan, in 1983 another search expedition to Gissar range, an educational training trip to Alek massif, 7th speleotechnics meeting in Šihan near Čeljabinsk, exploration trip to Kujbiševskaja cave on Arabika Massif, speleo camp in the Northern Urals, in 1985 an educational camp on Bzyb Range and an expedition to Iljuhin cave on Arabika, both in Western Caucasus.

During the difficult years for the Russian speleology, after the collapse of the USSR in 1991 his organizational skills and financial support helped SGS and Sverdlovsk-Ekaterinburg caving preserve the legacy of previous years. In the following years he led expeditions and field trips mainly to Central Asia, but also to other destinations such as Italy, Nepal and Norway.

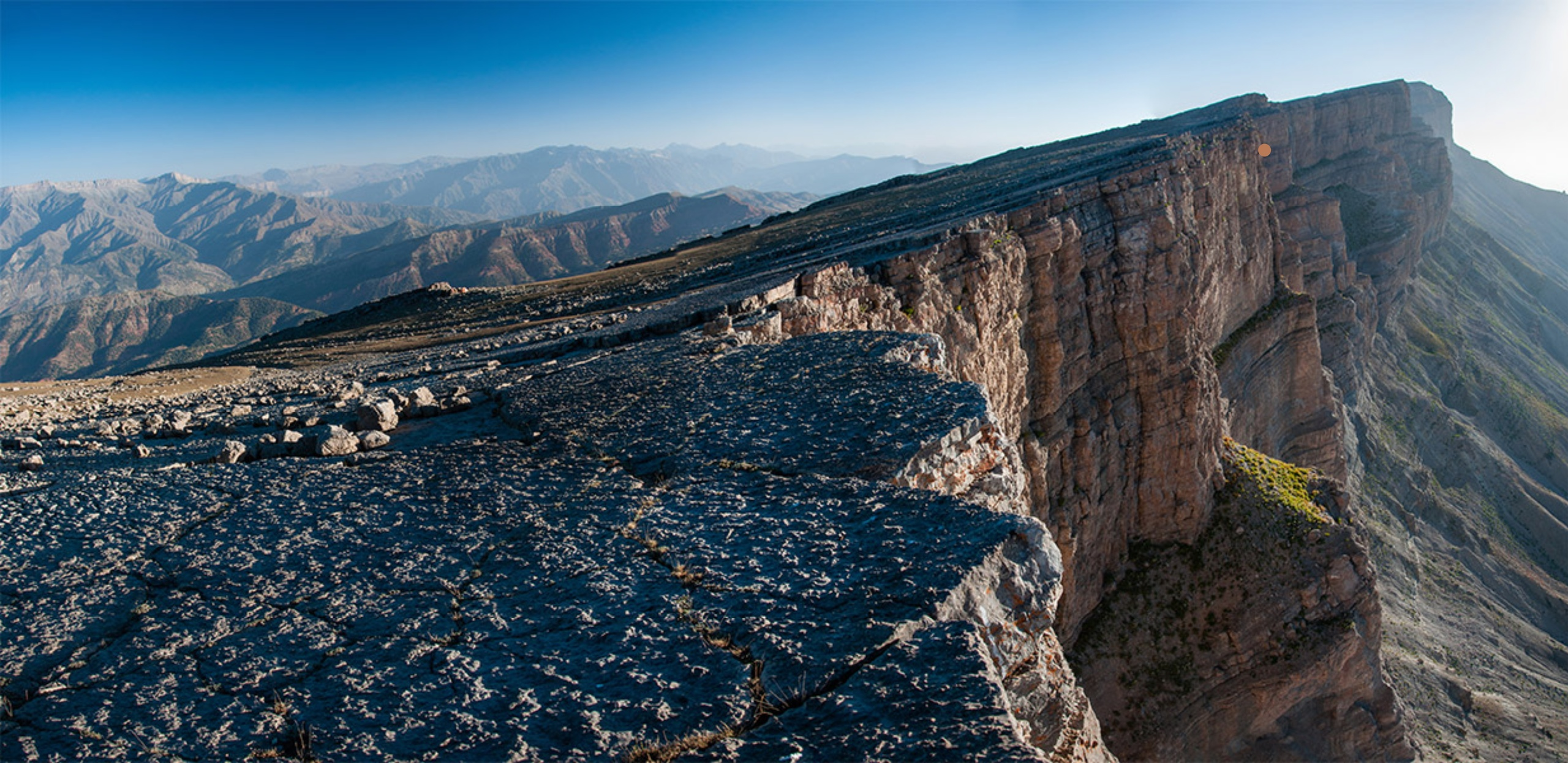
Chul-Bair mountain ridge, Uzbekistan, with entrance to the cave, named after Višnevskij

== Uzbekistan caves ==
After the discovery of Kiev Cave on the Kirk Tau plateau in Uzbekistan in 1972, 2340 m a. s. l., which was in the subsequent years explored to the depth of 990 m and was in the years 1977–1978 the deepest cave in the USSR, SGS cavers in the late 1970s started to search for new deep caves in the wider area. In May 1981 they discovered the Zindan cave, 3100 m a. s. l., in the Ketmen'-Čapta ridge. Its spring at the elevation of 1300 m indicated the possibility of a very deep cave. After the death of Sergej Zenkov, who fell into a pit during the summer expedition, the cave was renamed to Urals-Zenkov (Zindan) Cave. Next expedition in the following winter, co-led by Višnevskij, managed to dig through the siphon at −300 m and until January 1983 the final depth of 565 m was reached, in the siphon too narrow to dive. Several search expeditions in the summer 1983 were fruitless, and SGS decided to refocus on Arabika massif in Abkhazia, participating in expeditions of other speleological organizations. All in all Višnevskij was heading over 10 expeditions to Uzbekistan, mostly to Boybuloq.

== Boyboluq ==
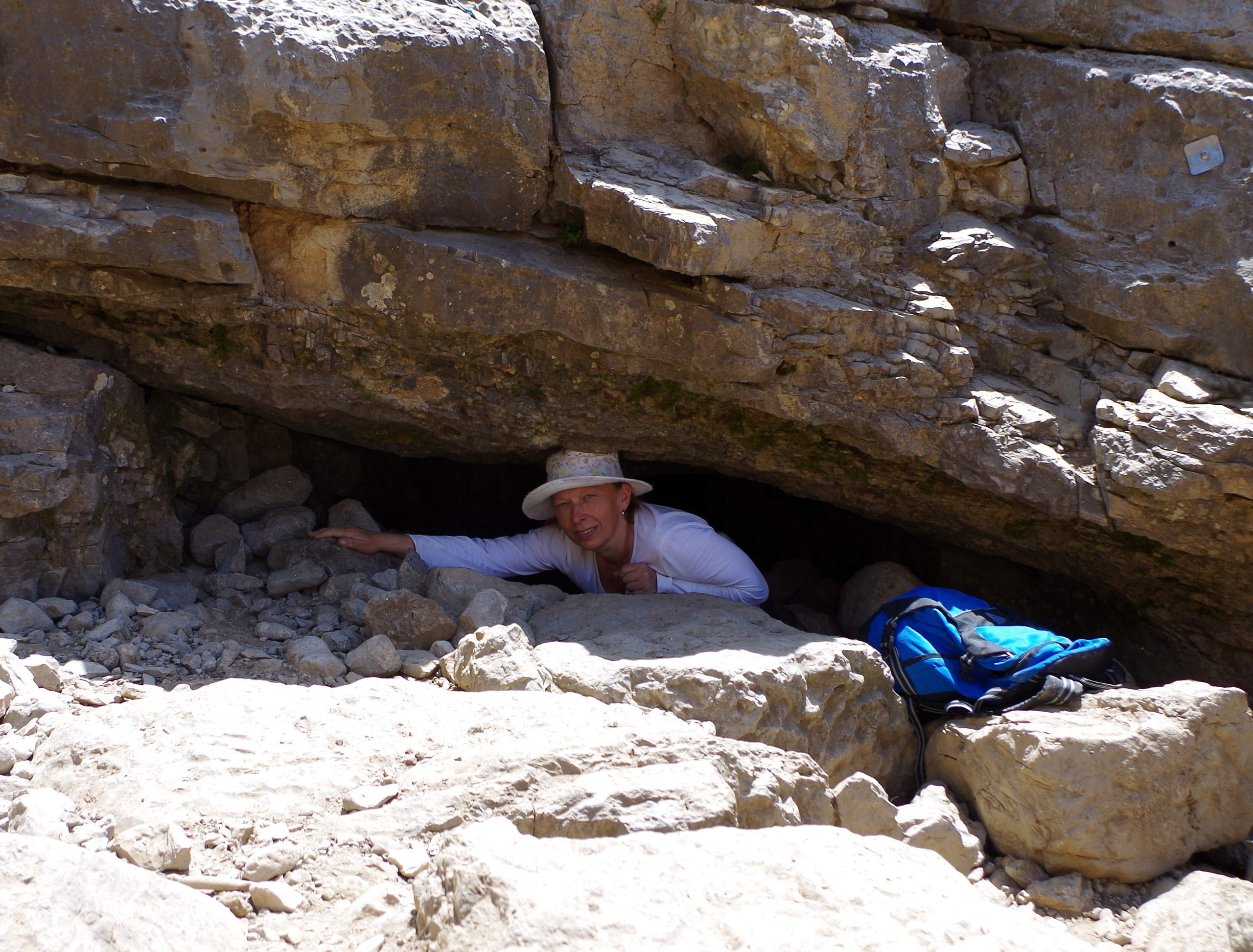
Entrance of the cave Boybuloq, Uzbekistan, with Elena Ljubavina

In 1985 they resumed the Uzbekistan campaign, to explore caves the entrances of which were discovered in 1984 by a token SGS expedition to Khodja-Gur-Gur-Ata massif. A group of five expedition members was sent to Surkhan-Tau ridge to scout its surface for new caves. On the way, in the village Kurgancha, 1455 m a. s. l., they were told of a cave higher in the mountain, called Boybuloq where a villager from the highest settlement in Uzbekistan, the village Dehibolo (boy buloq = rich spring in Uzbek language and the language of the people from the village, the Tajiki), went in 1971 and never returned. They followed the stream bed, discovered the cave, at an elevation of 2647 m, and followed its narrow meander which slowly ascended 600 meters in straight direction, to a height of 90 meters, where it turned down. Soon a 27-meter pit was reached and they discovered human remains at its bottom. Later it turned out that the man was Mustafaqul Zakirov, a teacher from Dehibolo who visited the cave, four hours away on foot, several times before. In May 1971, in time of severe drought, he departed to the cave with his son and pack donkeys to fetch water. He entered the cave, and after a crawl of about one hour, he reached the point close to the first pit, where his kerosene lamp went out. In the darkness he missed the direction towards outside and fell into the abyss.

Not only Boybuloq but most other caves in the area are a long sequence of very narrow passages which are difficult to pass, due to the geological situation and the very meager quantities of water present during the cave formation. In Višnevskij's own words, as recorded in 1999 by Sergej Kuklev, a member of his team:

A little about the Boybuloq morphology, – continued Višnevskij. – The cave developed in the Upper and Middle Jurassic limestones, in monoclinal limestone strata – this is the preserved wing of the anticline. The thickness of limestones, according to our observations, is from 200 to 350 meters. Boybuloq is located at an altitude of 2700 meters above sea level. The edge of the strata is at an altitude of 3800 meters. The upward development of the cave gives us an interesting perspective of increasing the cave to a substantial depth. The most interesting observation of the expedition confirmed our assumptions that all the waters flowing in different directions in Boybuloq are, apparently, of condensation origin, since the flood that we observed did not reach the lower horizons of the cave. All the water flows down the strata above the covered Central Asian karst and erodes the canyons, but does not form a cave.

Boybuloq – cave profile with surface NW-SE, as seen from the SW

In the following years further expeditions took place: in 1986 the cave was deepened to −400 m, in 1987 to −500 m and the remains of Zakirov were returned to his family, in 1988 a siphon at −600 m was free-dived and also the barrier on the other side lowered so that the lake could be waded through, and a new branch of the cave was discovered – it continued to −900 m. In 1989 a combined Soviet-Italian team reached the terminal siphon at −1154 m, and managed to climb upwards to the point at an elevation of +156 m which gave the total cave depth of 1310 m. In 1990 a Soviet-British team managed to extend the New branch in the cave upwards to +222 m (total depth 1376 m), in 1991 lower levels of the New branch were discovered, and in 1992 an additional chimney upwards was climbed, to +257 m which gave the final cave depth of 1415 m. In the next years the turmoil which followed the dissolution of the Soviet Union was unfavorable for caving expeditions and there were just a few. In 1994 the breakup of the majority of caving kit bags brought the misson to a premature end, in 1995 a major collapse in the cave was dug through, in 1998 the diving of the siphon at −560 m was unsuccessful, and the spring Holtan-Čašma, where the water from the terminal cave siphon comes to light, was also dived. The spring is situated 130 m below the terminal cave siphon while the horizontal distance is 7 km, and so the connecting passages are most likely submerged. SGS cavers returned to Uzbekistan in 2007, to Boybuloq, led again by Višnevskij and expeditions followed almost every year. New passages in Boybuloq were discovered and explored, yet the cave depth remained the same. Diving in the Holtan-Čašma spring was resumed in 2014, 2015 and 2016, when, at a horizontal distance of 170 m and depth of 18 m, a lenticular grotto was reached with narrow, downward extending slots, too narrow to pass.

== Death ==
Višnevskij never married, he lived alone. Yet he was always surrounded by friends and like-minded people, his life was filled with cave exploration, extreme sports and travel. In the last years his health started to deteriorate, but his premature death was caused by a nosocomial infection during the hospitalization after a domestic head injury.

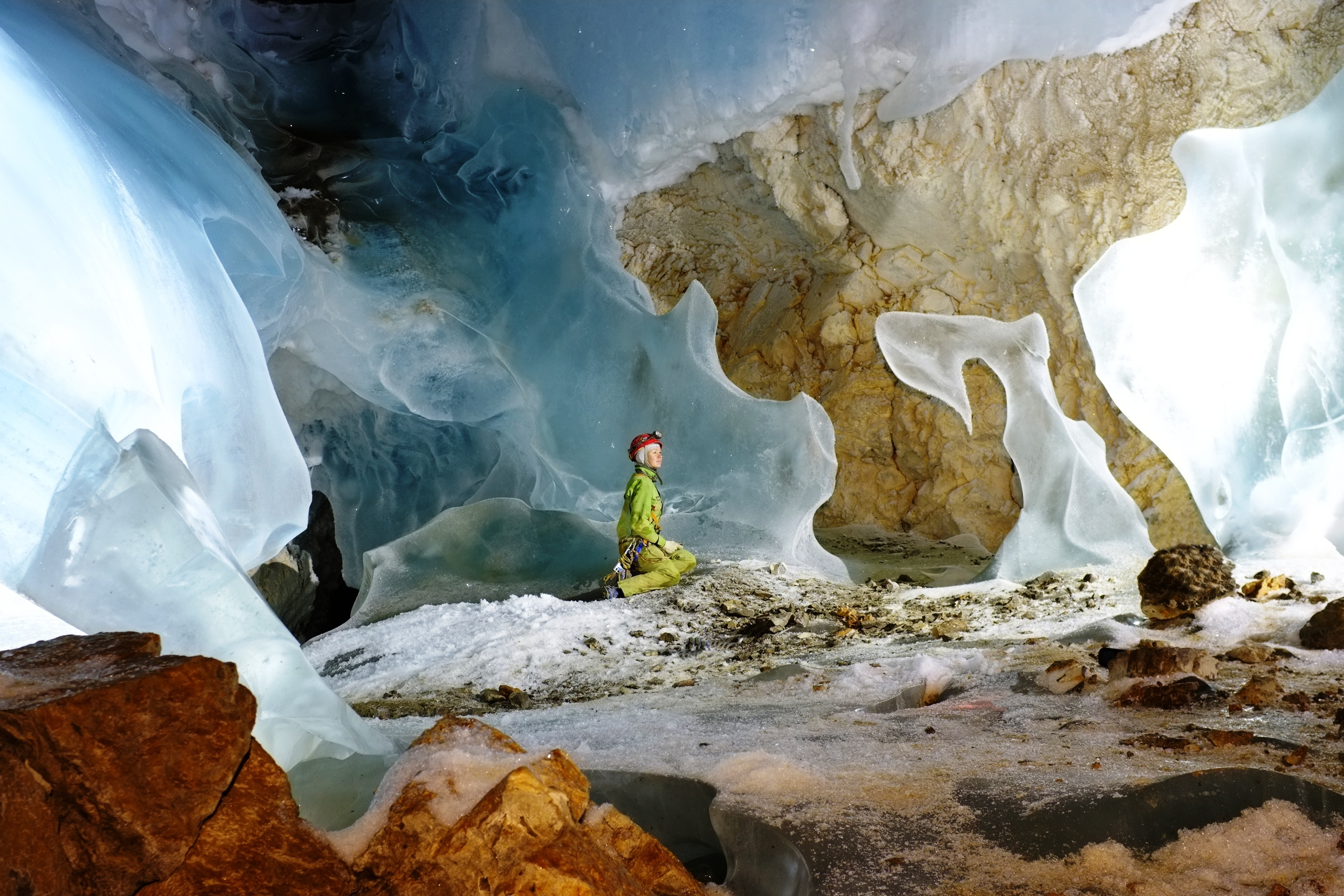
Polnolunie [Full Moon] hall in Ice, with Anastasija Buharova; Dark Star cave, Uzbekistan

== Legacy ==
Legacy of his work is manifold, especially notable are achievements of his home speleological institutions, the SGS and ASU, in the Chul-Bair mountain ridge, initiated by Višnevskij. In the year of his death, 2015, as part of the SGS and ASU expedition, a search team led by Vasilij Samsonov from Orenburg discovered a cave just below the cliff top, above the Boybuloq, which they marked as ČB-15, and explored it 400 meters far and 70 meters deep. In 2016 the cave was deepened to 260 m and prolonged to 1500 m. The main branch of the cave, now named Višnevskij cave, steadily descended in the direction of Boybuloq. Explorations continued in the following years and in 2019 the SGS and ASU team with the participation of Moscow and Irkutsk cavers bypassed the siphon at −735 m. They continued to a depth of 1131 m where they ended the exploration above the next pit because of lack of equipment and time. The connection of the two caves (in 2019 the closest point reached in Višnevskij cave was 50 m vertically and 250 m horizontally apart from Boybuloq) would achieve the cumulative depth of over 2000 m. The perspectives this achievement opened led to further initiatives of speleological exploration in the wider region.

Višnevskij's work reflected in movies about the expeditions in Uzbekistan, in books and travelogues.
