= Dark Star (cave) =

Cave system in Uzbekistan

- Location within Uzbekistan
- Location: Near village of Boysun, Uzbekistan
- Coordinates: 38°23′47″N 67°17′13″E
- Depth: >900 metres (3,000 ft)
- Length: >17 kilometres (11 mi)
- Discovery: 1984
- Geology: limestone

Dark Star is the name of a cave system located in the Boysuntov Range in Uzbekistan, some 350 kilometres (220 mi) from the capital Tashkent, near the village of Boysun.

It has seven entrances. The first cave entrances were discovered by Russians in 1984, but it was not until 1990 when British cavers began to explore it. It is named after the 1974 film of the same name. As of March 2017, it has been explored by eight different expeditions, with over 17 kilometres (11 mi) of passageways discovered, with an estimated depth of over 900 metres (3,000 ft).

Nearby is another cave system, Festivalnaya: It is suspected the two are connected.

It is believed to be the longest cave in Uzbekistan, and possibly the deepest in the whole world.
