= Kruber =

Kruber may refer to:

- Alexander Kruber, Russian and Soviet geographer and professor
- Kruber Ridge on the Iturup Island
- Kruber Rock, Antarctica
- Johann Julius Kruber (d. 1826), Russian doctor and botanist, the namesake of the Krubera genus
