= Reprua River =

River in Abkhazia

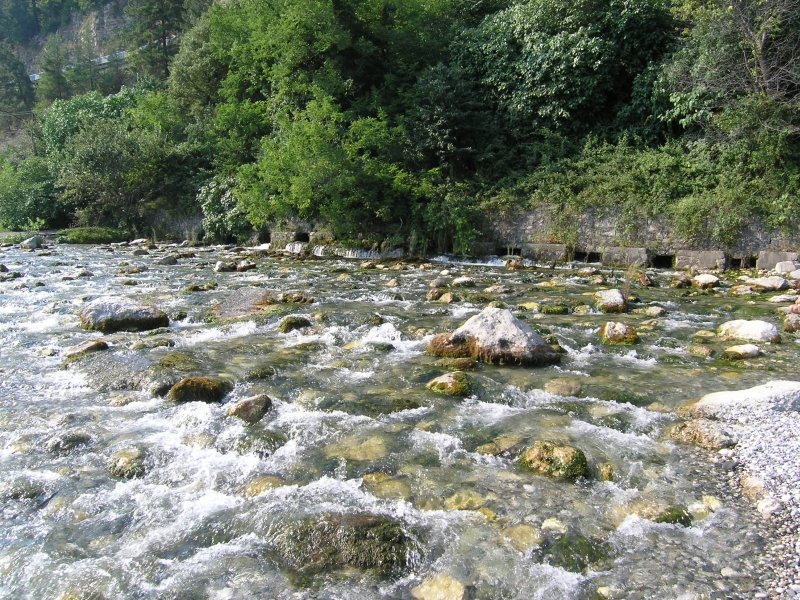

- Location within Abkhazia Location within Georgia
- Native name: Аԥрҩа (Abkhaz); რეპრუა (Georgian)

Location
- Country: Abkhazia (Note: The political status of Abkhazia is disputed. Having unilaterally declared independence from Georgia in 1992, Abkhazia is formally recognised as an independent state by 4 UN member states (three other states previously recognised it but then withdrew their recognition), while the remainder of the international community recognizes it as de jure Georgian territory. Georgia continues to claim the area as its own territory, designating it as Russian-occupied territory.)

Physical characteristics
- Source: Krubera Cave's springs
- Mouth: Black Sea
  - coordinates: 43°19′51″N 40°12′17″E
- Length: 0.018 km (0.011 mi)

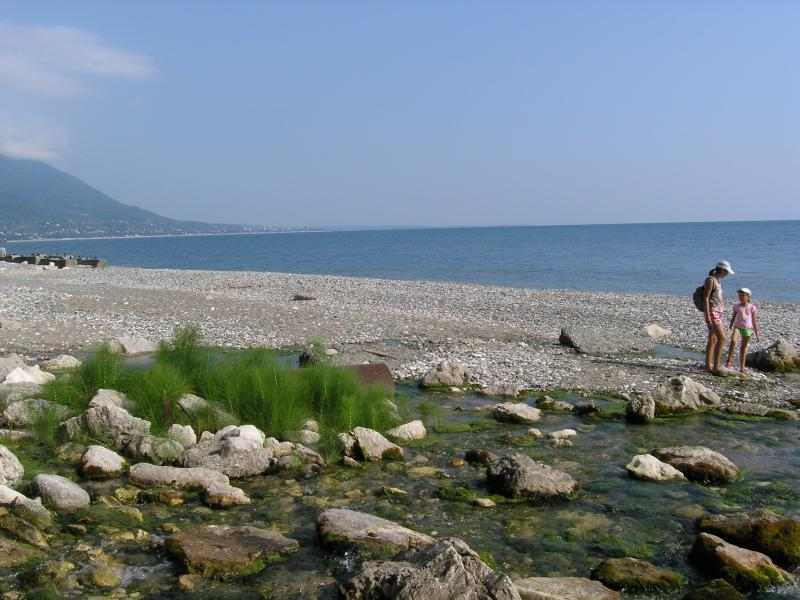

The Reprua (Georgian: რეპრუა, Abkhaz: Аԥрҩа) is a river in the Gagra District of Abkhazia. Only 18 m (59 ft) long, it is one of the shortest rivers in the world and is said to be one of the coldest rivers on the Black Sea coast.

Sources of the river are the springs in karst Krubera Cave. The Reprua flows into the Black Sea, in the southwestern outskirts of Gagra.

== Mythology ==
Based on an ancient Abkhazian legend, the river represents the tears of the children of an underground spirit, who lived on the shores of the Black Sea with his son and three daughters.

Suli was forging weapons for his boy and the warriors who guarded the only entrance to Abkhazia, the Gagra Pass. The weapons he forged were invincible, and the girls made food and clothes. After the death of the soul, no one could renew the weapon, and so his son and the warriors who stood by him were defeated in an unequal war against numerous armies that came from distant lands. Those who went south destroyed the three cave entrances through which the sisters came to the surface to see their brother. When the sisters realized that their brother was dead, they started crying. Tears formed small streams, which at the exit of the cave formed the Reprua, Anikhamtsa, and Bagarepsta rivers.

== See also ==
- Roe River, in the United States, also claimed to be the shortest river in the world at 61 m (200 ft)
- D River, also in the United States and claimed to be the shortest river in the world at 37 m (121 ft)
- Ombla, in Croatia, claimed to be the shortest river in the world at 30 m (98 ft)
