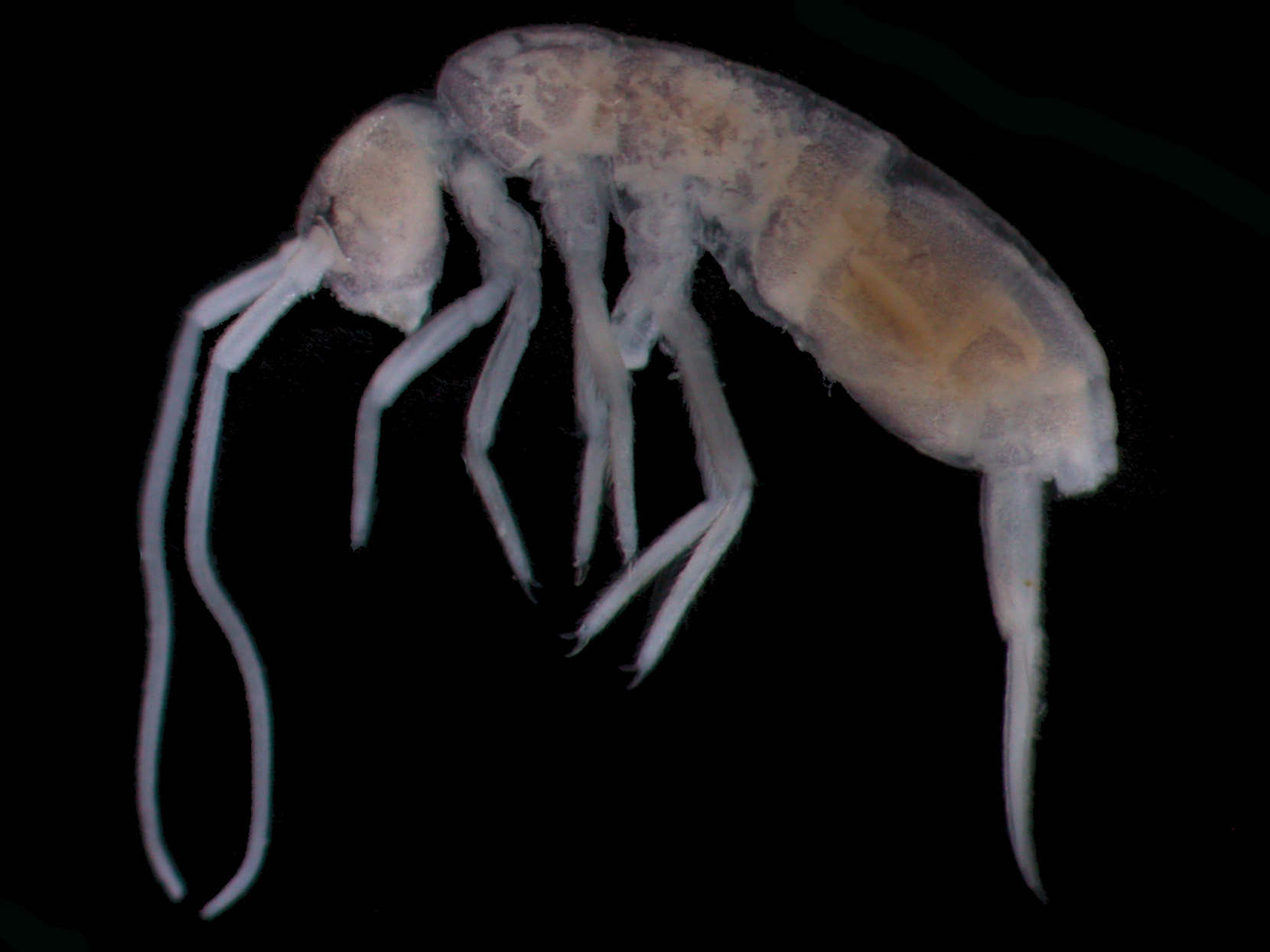

Scientific classification
- Kingdom: Animalia
- Phylum: Arthropoda
- Clade: Pancrustacea
- Class: Collembola
- Order: Entomobryomorpha
- Family: Tomoceridae
- Genus: Plutomurus
- Species: P. ortobalaganensis

Binomial name
- Plutomurus ortobalaganensis Jordana & Baquero, 2012

= Plutomurus ortobalaganensis =

Species of springtail that is the deepest terrestrial animal ever found on Earth

Plutomurus ortobalaganensis is the deepest terrestrial animal ever found on Earth, living at 1,980 metres (6,500 ft) below a cave entrance. It is a species of springtail (arthropods) endemic to the Krubera-Voronja cave system in Abkhazia, Georgia. It was discovered in the CAVEX Team expedition of 2010. It feeds on a few fungi and decomposing organic matter in the caves.

== Anatomy ==
It has long antennae, is eyeless, has a grayish body and has darker spots covering it.
