= Yuriy Kasyan =

Ukrainian speleologist (born 1961)

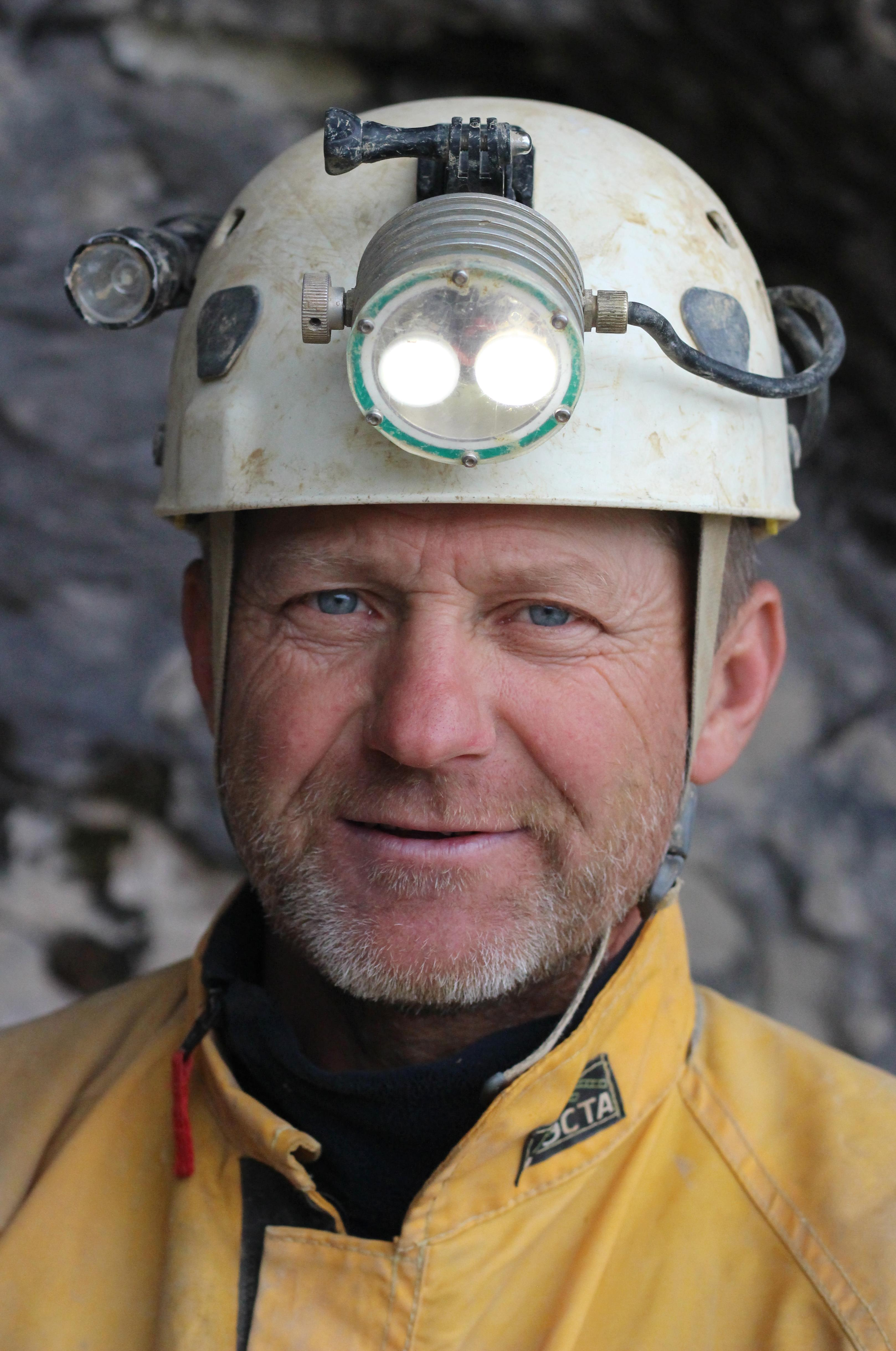
- in Coral Cave, Arabika, 2019
- Born: 6 May 1961 (age 65); Sniatyn, Ukraine
- Education: Ivano-Frankivsk National Technical University of Oil and Gas
- Years active: 1978–present
- Known for: speleology, deep cave projects
- Spouses: Antonina Kasjan (m. 1983–1989); Julija Timoševskaja (m. 1991–2002); Katerina Medvedeva (m. 2003–2005); Natalija Ščuka (m. 2009–2011); Zinaida Kasjan (m. 2011)
- Children: Anastasiya, Serhiy, Denys, Evhen, Anatoliy

Yuriy Mykhailovych Kasyan (Note: In this name that follows East Slavic naming customs, the patronymic is Mykhailovych and the family name is Kasyan.) (Ukrainian: Юрій Михайлович Касьян; born 6 May 1961) is a Ukrainian speleologist, most known for his work in cave exploration, especially as the Call of the Abyss research project coordinator. He was heading the speleological expeditions to caves of the Arabika massif in Abkhazia and, with Aleksandr Klimčuk, to Aladaglar massif in Turkey. Some of the world's deepest caves were explored, including the first cave, deeper than 2,000 m, the Krubera-Voronja Cave.

== Early life, education and career ==
Kasyan was born in Sniatyn, a small town in Western Ukraine, in the Ivano-Frankivsk Oblast, to the north of Moldova. His father, Mykhailo Yuriyovych Kasyan, was chairman of the District Council of the Sports Society "Grain Ear", which promoted athletic development in the countryside, and his mother was a statistician in the accounting department of the district party committee. After high school in Sniatyn where he also pursued swimming and freestyle wrestling he graduated (1984) in geology at the Ivano-Frankivsk National Technical University of Oil and Gas in the province capital Ivano-Frankivsk. After graduation, he moved to Poltava for a job in the regional branch of the All-Union Research and Design Institute for Explosive Geophysical Survey Methods. Kasyan continued as instructor at the Poltava regional center of education in tourism and local history and from there moved on to a career in industrial rope access.

== Speleology ==
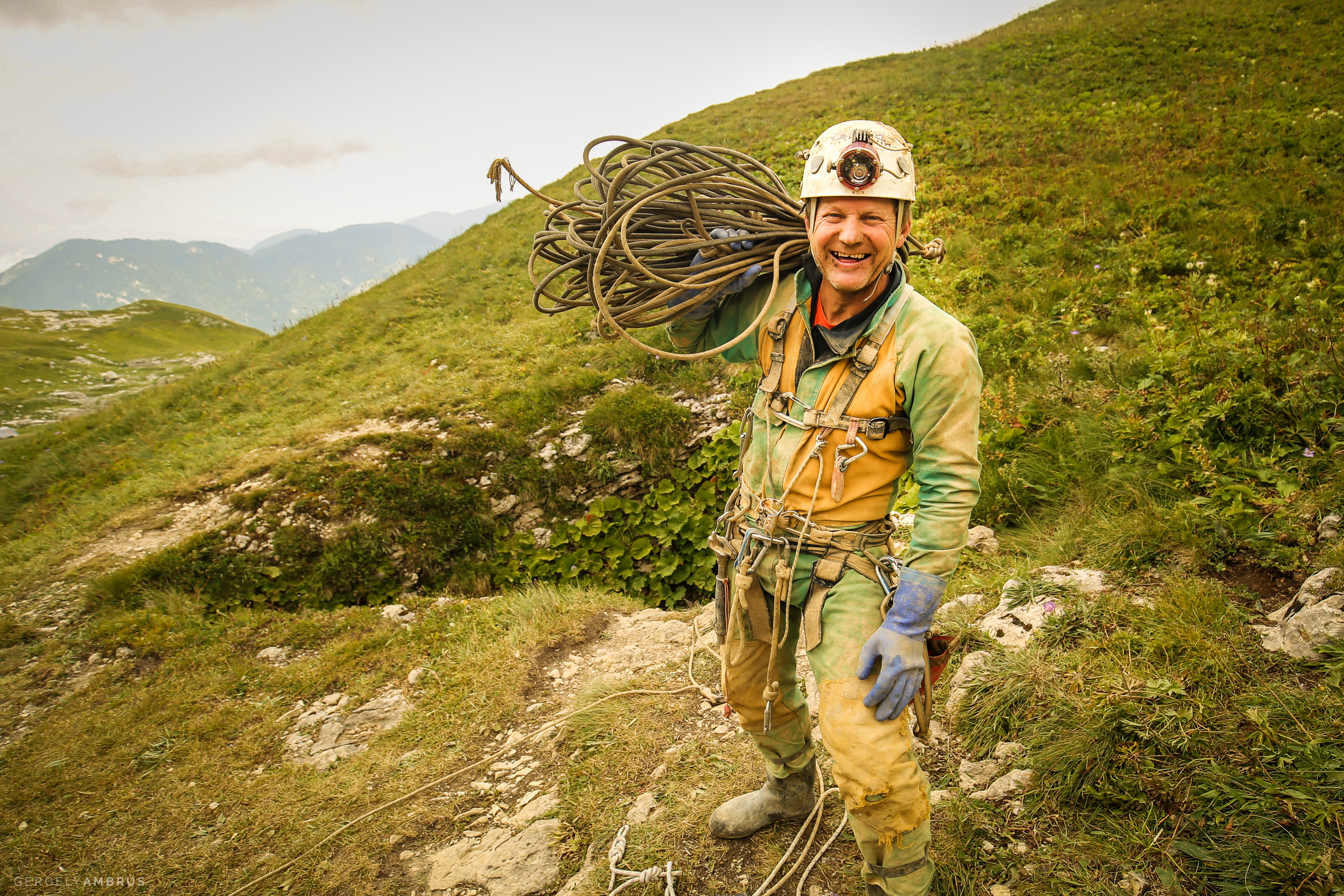
Kasyan at the entrance of the Krubera-Voronja cave in 2016

In the autumn of 1978, at the beginning of geology study in Ivano-Frankivsk, there were 3 available extra-curricular courses: in tourism, rock climbing and speleology. From the latter two Kasyan chose speleology as the closest to geology and joined the Ivano-Frankivsk speleo club Протей [Proteus]. He stayed till 1984, since 1981 he was its chairman. In 1984 he founded the Poltava speleoclub "Poltava-speleo", which he led until 2003. In 2004 he joined the Kyiv speleoclub; for several years he was the head of its speleo school, he is a longtime member of the club board.

In 1992 Kasyan was one of the founding members of the Ukrainian Speleological Association (UkrSA). As of April 2019 he is the vice-president of the UkrSA; he served as president in the years 1998–2001 and 2006–2007. Since 2003 he is an honorary member of the UkrSA, in 1996 and 2012 Kasyan was the recipient of the UkrSa Diploma for Outstanding Achievements.

He is the coordinator of the Training and Methodological Commission of the UkrSA, MIPKAR and “Call of the Abyss” projects, head of the UkrSA Cave Rescue Team.

From 1978 to 1998 Kasyan's caving activity was mostly devoted to caves of Western Ukraine and the Crimea, such as Gvozdetsky abyss, Liu-Khosar shaft, Shaft of the lost ones and discovery and mapping of over 1,5 km long Poltavskiy branch of the labyrinthine Mlinki cave. He initiated a program of marking and revising the caves of the Karabi plateau in the Crimea (1998).

From 1998 Kasyan participated in several international caving expeditions, to Arabika massif in Abkhazia (as a leader since 1999), to Skalarjevo brezno cave on Mt. Kanin in Slovenia and Aladaglar mountain range in Turkey as the leader of operations in the cave.

Cavers are known for their superstition, and Kasyan was never tempted to estimate expedition potential in advance:

Openly talking about cave depth (you are going to achieve) is a very bad sign. If you think that you will break the record and take too much equipment with you, the cave will get scared and she will stop you.

== Arabika Caves ==
Top three Ortobalagan caves, connected to Kasyan's work in the past 20 years

Kasyan's most important achievements are connected to exploration of a cave system above the eastern coast of the Black Sea, in the Ortobalagan valley in Abkhazia. He was leading the following expeditions, nearly always organized by the Ukrainian Speleological Association:

- 1999 August: the expedition's second team, trying to get an upper entrance to Arabika cave system, explored the previously disregarded windows in the shafts of Krubera-Voronja cave (-340 m at the time). One of them, at -230 m, continued to -700 m.
- 2000
  - August: the second team reached -1,200 m in Krubera-Voronja.
  - September: exploration continued to -1,410 m.
- 2001
  - December (2000) – January: - windows at – 1,350 meters led to a deeper passage at – 1,430 meters. In it a side passage at -1,420 m continued to -1,710 meters, world depth record, for the first time in a cave outside Western Europe.
  - August: explorations in the lower part (1,420 m -1,710 m); a siphon at -1,650 was dived.
- 2004 October: siphon bypass produced a descent to -2,080 meters. Another world cave depth record and Kasyan was the first caver to set foot deeper than 2,000 m.
- 2005
  - February: Kvitočka siphon in the Main branch of Krubera-Voronja cave was dived through and the depth of -1,980 m was reached.
  - October: 4 teams worked in the cave but had to stop because of flooding on 17 October.
- 2006 August: world cave depth record of 2,158 m was achieved by the diver Gennadij Samohin in the "Dva Kapitana" siphon. For the first time all the expedition garbage (excluding body waste) was brought back to surface.
- 2007 August – September: G. Samohin moved the world cave depth record to -2,191 m in the same siphon. For the first time only electric illumination was used in the cave.
- 2008 August: works continued in the main branch of the cave and in Nekujbiševskaja branch, as well as in the cave Вентилятор [Ventilation Fan].
- 2009 August – September: two teams, the second headed by Aidas Gudaitis from Lithuania, worked in Krubera-Voronja, Kujbiševskaja, Detskaja and Silver Prince caves. Temperature and pressure loggers were installed at the bottom of the cave. Radiation levels were measured in all the caves. All readings but one (in Kujbiševskaja cave at -500 m) were within normal limits. There were issues with body feces contaminated water which led to serious gastrointestinal problems of one caver. The decision was made to store, in the future, all body waste in special containers and bring it back to surface.
- 2010 August – September: exploration continued in the Nekujbiševskaja branch of the cave. It was prolonged by 600 m, 2 siphons were dived.
- 2011 September: in Nekujbiševskaja branch of Krubera-Voronja the siphon Koljučka (Thorn) at 1,558 m was free dived after a drawdown, digging in a connection passage to Kujbiševskaja cave was continued. Martel cave (entrance at 2,316 m a.s.l.) was deepened to 95 m, it ends in a narrow meander with strong air current.
- 2012 July–August: G. Samohin corrected the world cave depth record to -2,196 m in the "Dva Kapitana" siphon of Krubera-Voronja. Martel cave depth was moved to 135 m.
- 2013 July–August: cave fauna was collected in Krubera-Voronja. Gennadij Samohin caught a few crustaceans in the "Dva Kapitana" siphon, fish traps produced no results. Martel cave was slightly prolonged, strong roar of wind follows. Works began in Berčilskaja (pron. Berchilskaya) cave (2,430 m a.s.l., -500 m), a possible higher entrance to Krubera.
- 2014 August: Amber siphon in Krubera-Voronja was dived through; the path to historical bottom at -340 m was cleared. Top tight passages in Berčilskaja were widened. An expedition of MSU Speleo Club connected Krubera-Voronja with Arbaika cave and the total depth reached 2,199 m.
- 2015 August: narrows in Berčilskaja cave, at that time 500 m deep, were cleared till the depth of 400 m.
- 2016 July–August: at the historical bottom in Krubera-Voronja a series of shafts led back to the main branch of the cave. Berčilskaja – a new bottom was reached at -630 m.
- 2017 August: In Krubera-Voronja 60 m of a large tunnel in the siphon at -1,650 m was dived. In Berčilskaja depth of -770 was reached and a better survey was made. The main direction of new parts is south, away from Krubera-Voronja. Connection will have to be searched elsewhere.
- 2018 August: digging in Berčilskaja cave was conducted, in most lucrative places for connection with Krubera-Voronja, at -480 m and at -650 m (Old School hall).

His right hand in most of these projects was Russian cave diver from Simferopol, Gennadij Samohin; as of July 2019 cavers from 20 countries have participated in the list (sorted in descending order by the number of expeditions – given after the country name if exceeding 1): Ukraine (21), Russia (14), Israel (8), United States (4), Bulgaria (3), Lithuania (3), Poland (2), Spain (2), United Kingdom (2), Belarus, Belgium, Britain, France, Iran, Ireland, Italy, Lebanon, Moldova and Turkey.

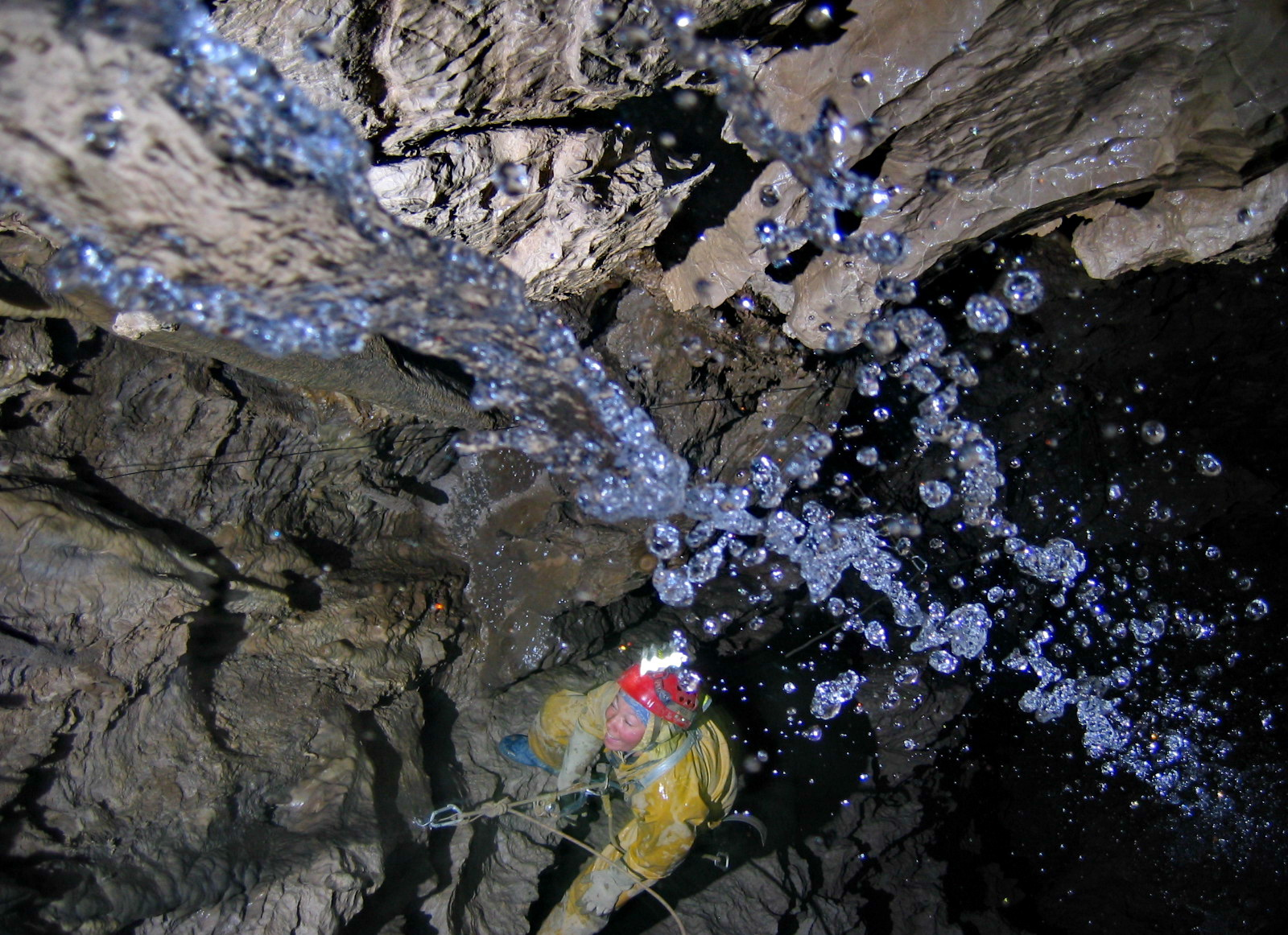
Water is probably the most picturesque cave element: Maša Plotnikova in Krubera-Voronja cave, at -1,340 m, 2007, by J. Kasyan

== Aladaglar Caves ==
Kasyan also made a major contribution to exploration of caves in the Aladaglar mountain ridge above the southern coast of Anatolia in Turkey, in the framework of the Call of the Abyss project. From 2002 to 2008 over 150 new caves were examined in the area, most notably Kuzgun cave, discovered in 2003, explored 400 m deep and in 2004 to its final (as of 2019) depth of 1400 m. In 2005, 2008 and 2013 three caves in the vicinity which could lead to greater depth were examined, 900 m deep side branch in Kuzgun was explored and engineering works at the cave bottom, which would stabilize loose collapse, were undertaken. In 2018 and 2019 Kasyan lead expeditions to new caves in the neighbouring area, also as part of the project.

== Film, photography, journalism ==
Kasyan documented the underground explorations in which he participated in over 100 short films. His photographs, especially from the Krubera-Voronja cave were published in several national and international journals, books such as The Darkness Beckons, and other publications, including the official cave photo site of the Ukrainian Speleological Association. He was a juror in international cave photography competitions. Since 2004 Kasyan is the editor of the Ukrainian speleo journal Свет [Light].
