= Anurida stereoodorata =

Scientific classification
- Kingdom: Animalia
- Phylum: Arthropoda
- Class: Collembola
- Order: Poduromorpha
- Family: Neanuridae
- Subfamily: Pseudachorutinae
- Genus: Anurida
- Species: A. stereoodorata

Binomial name
- Anurida stereoodorata Jordana & Baquero, 2012

Species of springtail

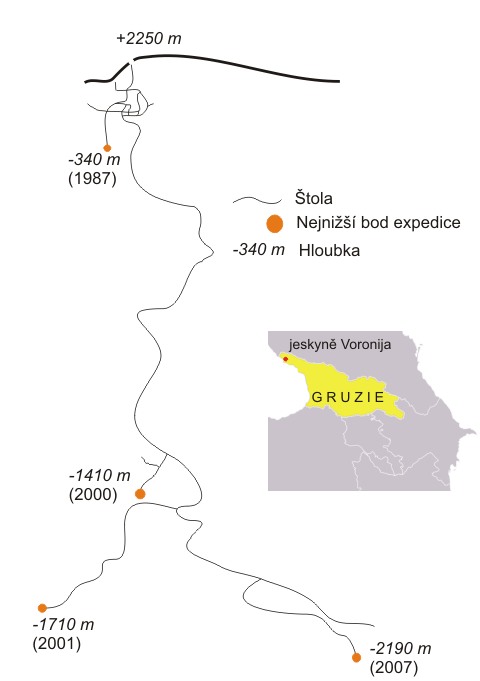
Voronija cave system

Anurida stereoodorata is a species of springtails (arthropod) endemic to the Krubera-Voronja cave system in Georgia. It is one of the deepest terrestrial animals ever found on Earth, living at >1,800 metres (5,900 ft) below the cave entrance. It was discovered in the CAVEX Team expedition of 2010.
