= Plutomurus =

Scientific classification
- Domain: Eukaryota
- Kingdom: Animalia
- Phylum: Arthropoda
- Class: Collembola
- Order: Entomobryomorpha
- Family: Tomoceridae
- Genus: Plutomurus; Yosii, 1956

Genus of springtails

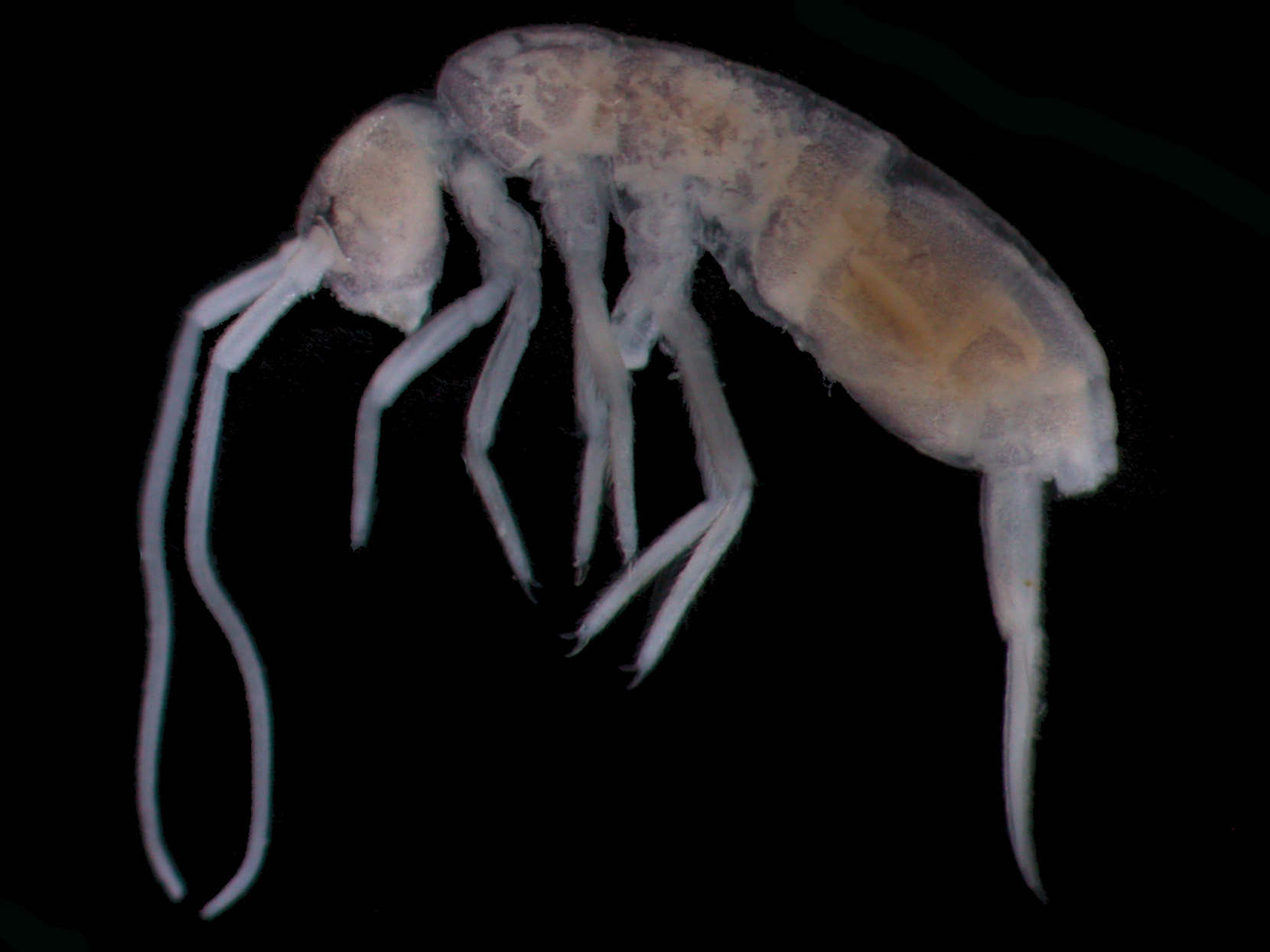
Picture of a Plutomurus Ortobalaganensis

Plutomurus is a genus of springtails belonging to the family Tomoceridae.

Species:

- Plutomurus abchasicus
- Plutomurus baschkiricus
- Plutomurus ortobalaganensis
