= Alexander Kruber =

Russian and Soviet geologist (1871–1941)

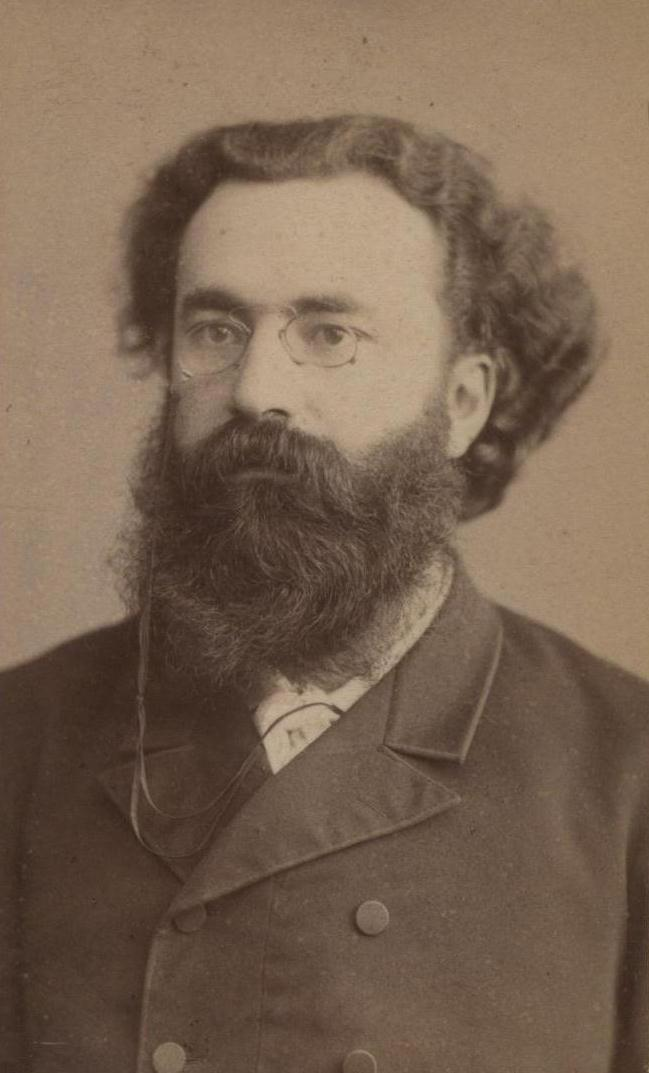
Alexander Kruber

Alexander Alexandrovich Kruber (Note: Also transliterated as Aleksandr and Aleksandrovich.) (Russian: Александр Александрович Крубер; 22 August [O.S. 10 August] 1871 – December 15, 1941) was a Russian and Soviet geographer and professor. He was the founder of Russian and Soviet karstology.

== Biography ==
Alexander Kruber was born in Voskresensk, Russia (now Istra). He graduated from Imperial Moscow University in 1897. He published a textbook in 1917, titled General Earth Science. He became the chairman of the Geography Department of Moscow University in 1919, succeeding Dmitry Anuchin. Anuchin was one of Kruber's teachers at Moscow University. Kruber then served as the director of the Scientific Research Institute of Geography from 1923 to 1927. From 1927, he could no longer work due to significant health problems.

He studied the karst structures of the East European Plain, Crimea, and Caucasus.

A mountain ridge on the Iturup Island (Kruber Ridge), a karst cavity in the Qarabiy yayla Crimea, and a karst cave in Georgia (Krubera Cave), are named after him.

== Books ==
- Гидрография карста, М., 1913
- Карстовая область горного Крыма, М., 1915
- Общее землеведение, 5 изд., ч. 1—3, М., 1938
