= Kruber Ridge =

Coordinates: 45.3958°N 148.5820°E

The Kruber Ridge is a mountain ridge on the Iturup Island. It is a chain of inactive volcanoes in the northeastern part of the Medvezhy Peninsula ("Bear Peninsula") of the island and constitutes part of the water divide between the Okhotsk Sea and the Pacific Ocean. The average elevation is 400-700m, the highest point being Mount Shibetoro (Shibetoro Peak, Shibetoro-dake) (853m).

The ridge is named after Alexander Kruber.
