= Gennady Samokhin =

Ukrainian speleologist (born 1971)

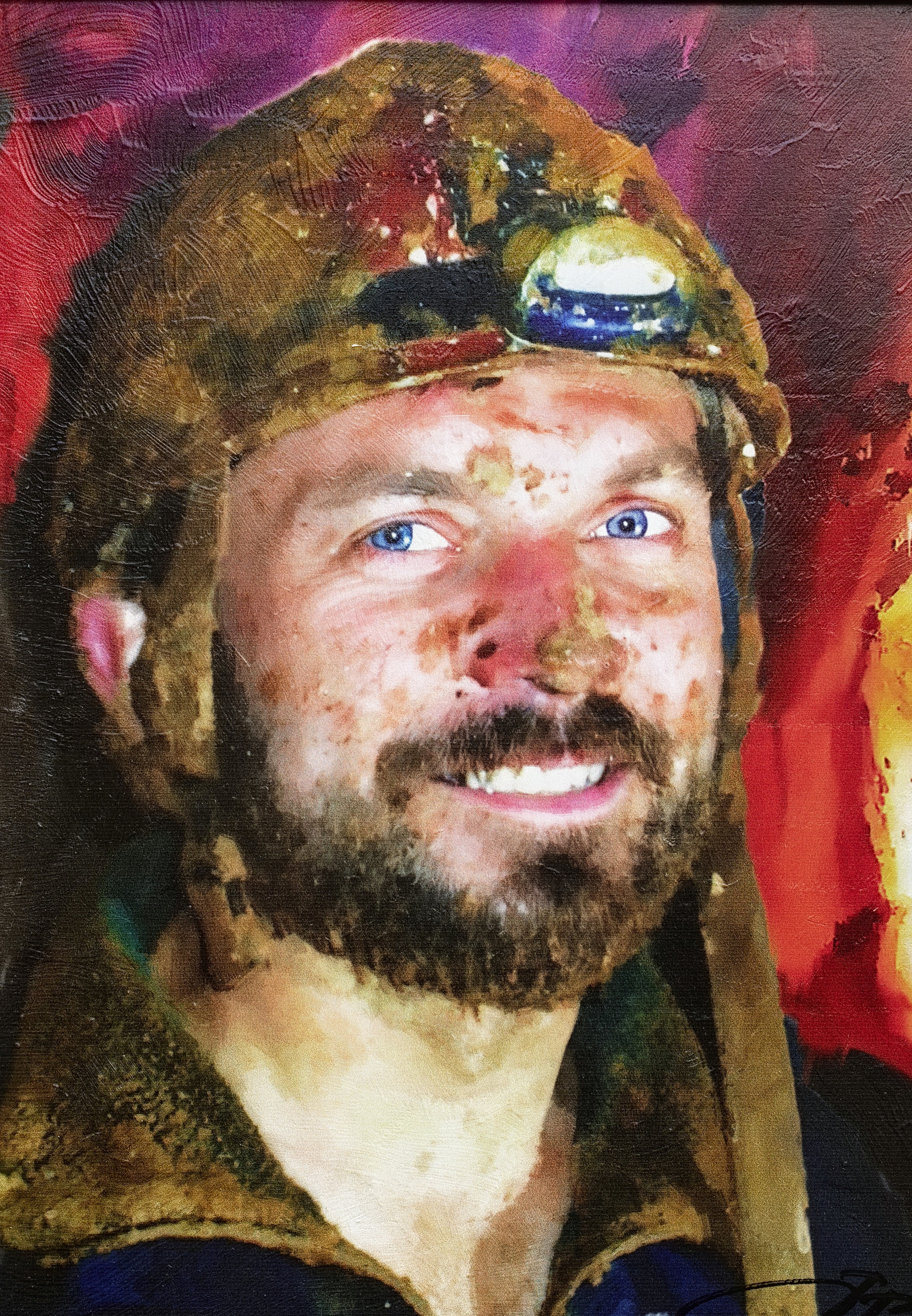
- in a cave, around 2000
- Born: July 14, 1971 (age 55); Simferopol
- Education: Tavrida National V.I. Vernadsky University
- Known for: speleology, deep cave diving

Gennady Viktorovich Samokhin (Геннадий Викторович Самохин; born July 14, 1971, in Simferopol) is a Crimean speleologist who holds the depth world record of cave diving in a sump at −2,196 meters, attained while exploring the Krubera Cave in 2012. He was educated and works in the Tavrida National V.I. Vernadsky University (now Crimean Federal University).
