= Krubera Cave =

Cave in Abkhazia, Georgia

- Voronya Cave
- Location within Abkhazia Location within Georgia
- Interactive map of Krubera Cave
- Location: Abkhazia, (Note: The political status of Abkhazia is disputed. Having unilaterally declared independence from Georgia in 1992, Abkhazia is formally recognised as an independent state by 4 UN member states (three other states previously recognised it but then withdrew their recognition), while the remainder of the international community recognizes it as de jure Georgian territory. Georgia continues to claim the area as its own territory, designating it as Russian-occupied territory.) Georgia
- Coordinates: 43°24′35″N 40°21′44″E
- Depth: 2,224 m (7,297 ft)
- Length: 16.058 km (9.978 mi)
- Elevation: 2,256 m (7,402 ft)
- Discovery: 1960
- Geology: Limestone
- Entrances: 6
- Translation: Crows' Cave (Russian)

Kruber's Cave, also Krubera Cave (Note: "Krubera" is the Russian genitive case for the name "Kruber".) (Georgian: კრუბერის გამოქვაბული, romanized: k'ruberis gamokvabuli or კრუბერის ღრმული, k'ruberis ghrmuli; Abkhaz: Ӡоу Аҳаҧы, romanized: Źou Ah̦aṕy), also known as Voronya Cave (sometimes spelled Voronja Cave), is the deepest known cave on Earth. It is located in the Arabika Massif of the Gagra Range of the Western Caucasus, in the Gagra District of Abkhazia, a Russian-backed, separatist-occupied region of Georgia.

The difference in elevation of the highest cave entrance (Arabika) and its deepest explored point is 2,199 ± 20 metres (7,215 ± 66 ft). It became the deepest known cave in the world in 2003 when the Ukrainian Speleological Association reached a depth of 1,910 m (6,270 ft). This exceeded the previous record, Lamprechtsofen in the Austrian Alps, by 80 metres (260 ft). In 2006, for the first time in the history of speleology, the Ukrainian Speleological Association expedition reached a depth greater than 2,000 m (6,600 ft), and explored the cave to −2,080 m (−6,824 ft). Ukrainian diver Gennadiy Samokhin extended the cave by diving in the terminal sump to 46-meter (151 ft) depth in 2007 and then to 52 m (171 ft) in 2012, setting successive world records of 2,191 m (7,188 ft) and 2,197 m (7,208 ft), respectively. In 2017 this title was taken by the Veryovkina Cave, but in 2024 the depth of Krubera Cave was reevaluated to the current record. Krubera Cave is one of the two known caves deeper than 2,000 metres, the other being Veryovkina Cave in the same mountain range.

== Naming ==
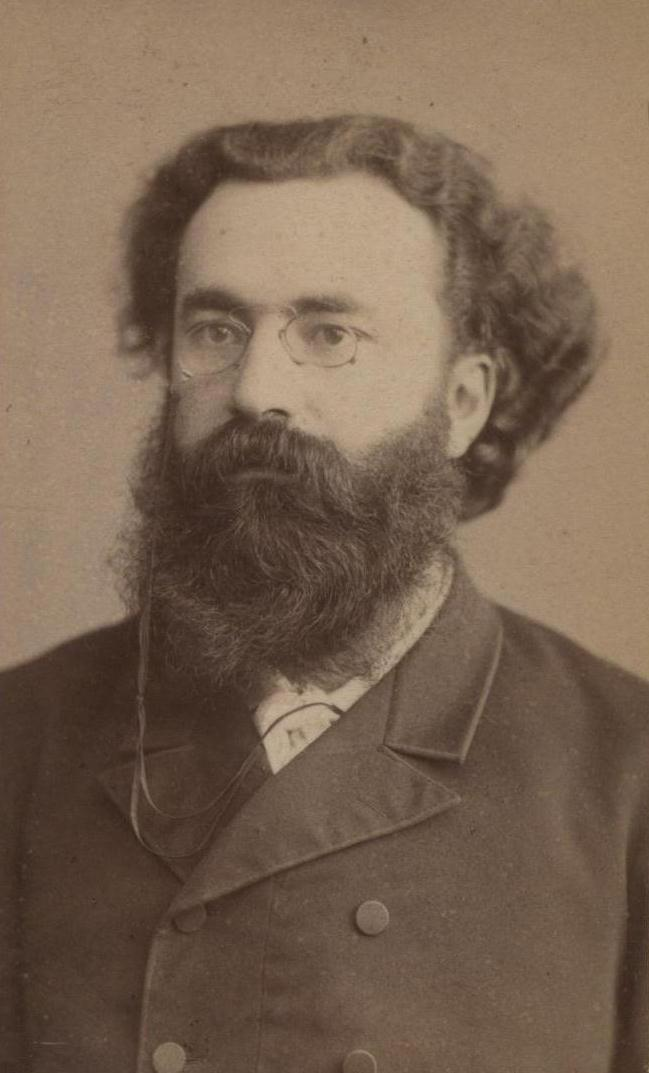
Alexander Kruber

Georgian speleologists from the so-called "Kipiani group" who discovered the cave in 1963 named it for Russian geographer Alexander Kruber and explored it to -57 m. In the 1980s the cave was rediscovered by another group and called "Siberian cave". It was rediscovered again by Ukrainian speleologists and called Voronya (Crows' cave) after the crows nesting in the entrance pit. Only a later exchange of information between the caving clubs revealed that they explored the same cave.

== Location and background ==
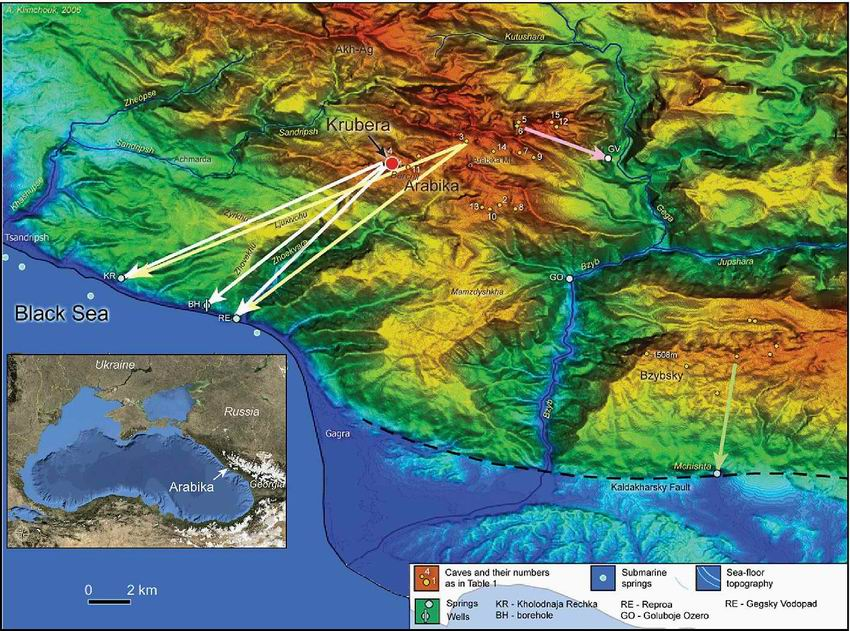
Map of the Arabika Massif, showing the location of Krubera Cave and its projected resurgences

The Arabika Massif, the home of Kruber's (Voronya) Cave, is one of the largest high-mountain limestone karst massifs in the Western Caucasus. It is composed of Lower Cretaceous and Upper Jurassic limestones that dip continuously southwest to the Black Sea and plunge below the modern sea level.

To the northwest, north, northeast, and east, Arabika is bordered by the deeply incised canyons of Sandripsh, Kutushara, Gega and Bzyb rivers. The Bzyb River separates Arabika from the adjacent Bzybsky Massif, another outstanding karst area with many deep caves, including the Snezhnaja-Mezhonogo-Iljuzia System (−1,753 m or −5,751 ft) and Pantjukhina Cave (−1,508 m or −4,948 ft). To the southwest, Arabika borders the Black Sea.

The Arabika Massif has a prominent high central sector with elevations above the tree line at ~1,800–1,900 m (5,900–6,200 ft). This is an area of classical glaciokarstic landscape, with numerous glacial trough valleys and cirques, with ridges and peaks between them. The bottoms of trough valleys and karst fields lie at elevations of 2,000–2,350 m (6,560–7,710 ft), and ridges and peaks rise to 2,500–2,700 m (8,200–8,900 ft). The highest peak is the Peak of Speleologists (2,705 m (8,875 ft)) but the dominant summit is a typical pyramidal horn of the Arabika Mount (2,695 m (8,842 ft)). Some middle- to low-altitude ridges covered with forest lie between the central sector and the Black Sea. A plateau-like middle-altitude outlier of the massif in its south sector is Mamzdyshkha, with part of the plateau slightly emerging above the tree line.

Among several hundred caves known in the Arabika Massif, fifteen have been explored deeper than 400 m (1,300 ft) and five deeper than 1,000 m (3,300 ft).

Kruber's Cave is located at 2,256 m (7,402 ft) above sea level in the Ortobalagan Valley, a perfectly shaped, relatively shallow, glacial trough of the sub-Caucasian stretch, which holds the advanced position in the Arabika's central sector relative to the seashore. Since 1980 Soviet, and later Russian, Moldavian and Ukrainian cavers have been undertaking systematic efforts in exploring deep caves in the Ortobalagan Valley, resulting in exploration of the Krubera Cave to its current depth and of the surrounding caves, now mostly connected to it. Another deep cave in the valley, located in its very upper part is Berchilskaya Cave, 770 m (2,530 ft) deep. All large caves of the Ortobalagan Valley likely belong to a single hydrological system, connected to large submarine springs at the Black Sea shore.

== Geology ==
Vertical profiles of Voronja, Arabika and Berčilskaja caves

The Ortobalagan Valley extends along the crest of the Berchil'sky anticline, which gently plunges northwest. The cave entrances are aligned along the anticlinal crest but the caves are controlled by longitudinal, transverse, and oblique fractures and faults and exhibit complex winding patterns in the plan view, remaining largely within and near the anticlinal crest zone. The caves are predominantly combinations of vadose shafts and steep meandering passages, although in places they cut apparently old fossil passages at different levels (e.g., at −2,100–2,040 m (−6,890–6,690 ft) in Kujbyshevskaja and Krubera caves, −1,200–1,240 m (−3,940–4,070 ft) and −980–1,150 m (−3,220–3,770 ft) in the non-Kujbyshevskaja branch of Krubera Cave, etc.). The deep parts of Krubera display a more pervasive conduit pattern with a mixture of phreatic morphology, characteristic of the zone of high-gradient floods, which can be up to 400 m (1,300 ft) above the low-flow water table, and vadose downcutting elements that are observed even below the water table.

The core part of the Arabika Massif is composed of the Upper Jurassic succession resting on the Bajocian Porphyritic Series, which includes sandstones, clays and conglomerates at the top, and tuff, tuffaceous sandstones, conglomerates and breccia, porphyry and lava. The Porphyritic series forms the non-karstic basement of Arabika, which is exposed only on the northern and eastern outskirts, locally in the bottoms of the Kutushara and Gega River valleys. In the central part of Arabika the Cretaceous cover (Valanginian and Hauterivian limestones, marls and sandstones) is retained only in a few ridges and peaks, but it lies intact through the low-altitude ridges to the south-west of the central part. There the Cretaceous succession includes Barremian and Aptian–Cenomanian limestones and marly limestones with abundant concretions of black chert.

The Upper Jurassic succession begins with thin-bedded Kimmeridgian–Oxfordian cherty limestones, marls, sandstones and clays, which are identified in the lower part of Krubera Cave. Above lies the thick Tithonian succession of thick-bedded limestones with marly and sandy varieties. Sandy limestones are particularly abundant through the upper 1,000 m (3,300 ft) sections of deep caves of the Ortobalagan Valley.

The tectonic structure of Arabika is dominated by the axis of the large sub-Caucasian anticline (oriented NW–SE), with the gently dipping southwestern mega-flank, complicated by several low-order folds, and steeply dipping northeastern flank. The axis of the anticline roughly coincides with the ridge bordering the Gelgeluk Valley to the north. Located on the southwestern flank of the major anticline is another large one (Berchil'sky), in which the crest is breached by the Ortobalagan Valley. There are several smaller sub-parallel anticlines and synclines farther southwest, between the Berchil' Ridge and the coast.

The plicative dislocation structure of the massif is severely complicated by faults, with the fault-block structure strongly controlling both cave development and groundwater flow. Major faults of the sub-Caucasian orientation delineate several large elongated blocks that experienced uplift with different rates during Pliocene and Pleistocene. This had a pronounced effect on the development of deep groundwater circulation and of Krubera Cave in particular. Both longitudinal and transverse faults and related fracture zones play a role in guiding groundwater flow; the latter guide flow across the strike of major plicative dislocations, from the central sector toward the Black Sea.

== Cave entrances ==
The cave has six entrances, in the gallery below they are arranged by altitude, highest to lowest, after the main one. All are situated above the tree line.

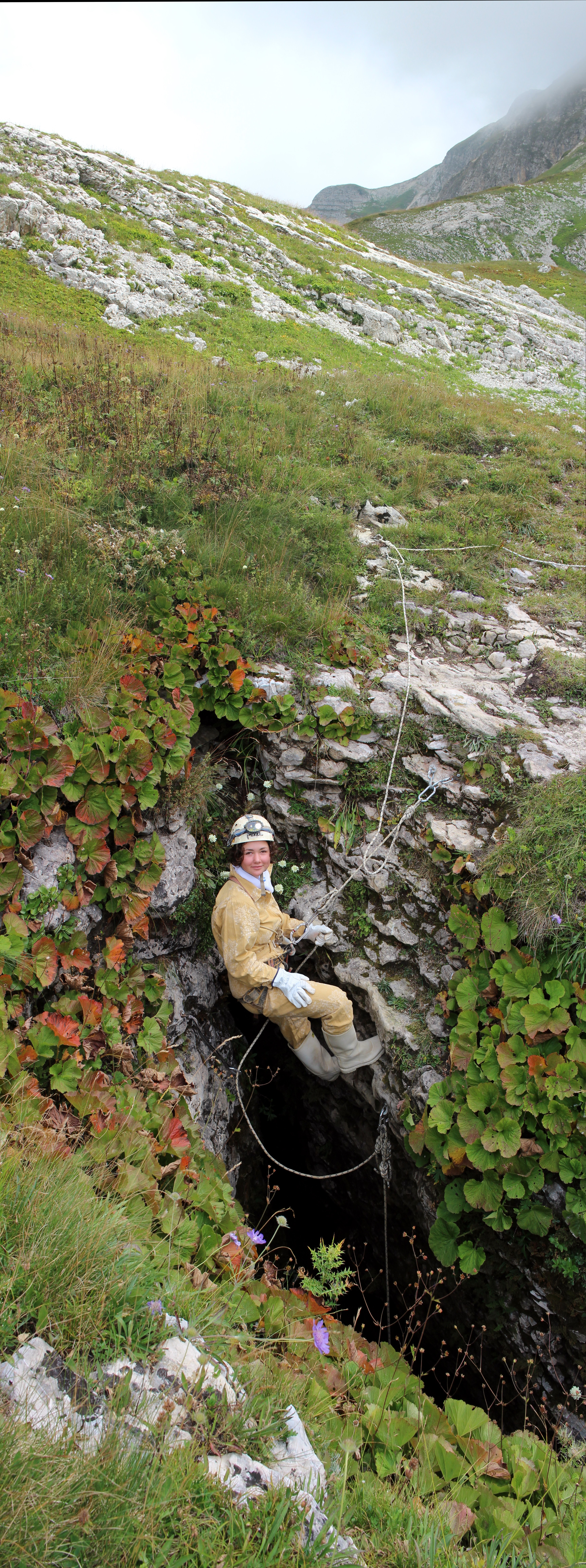
Voronja, 2256 m

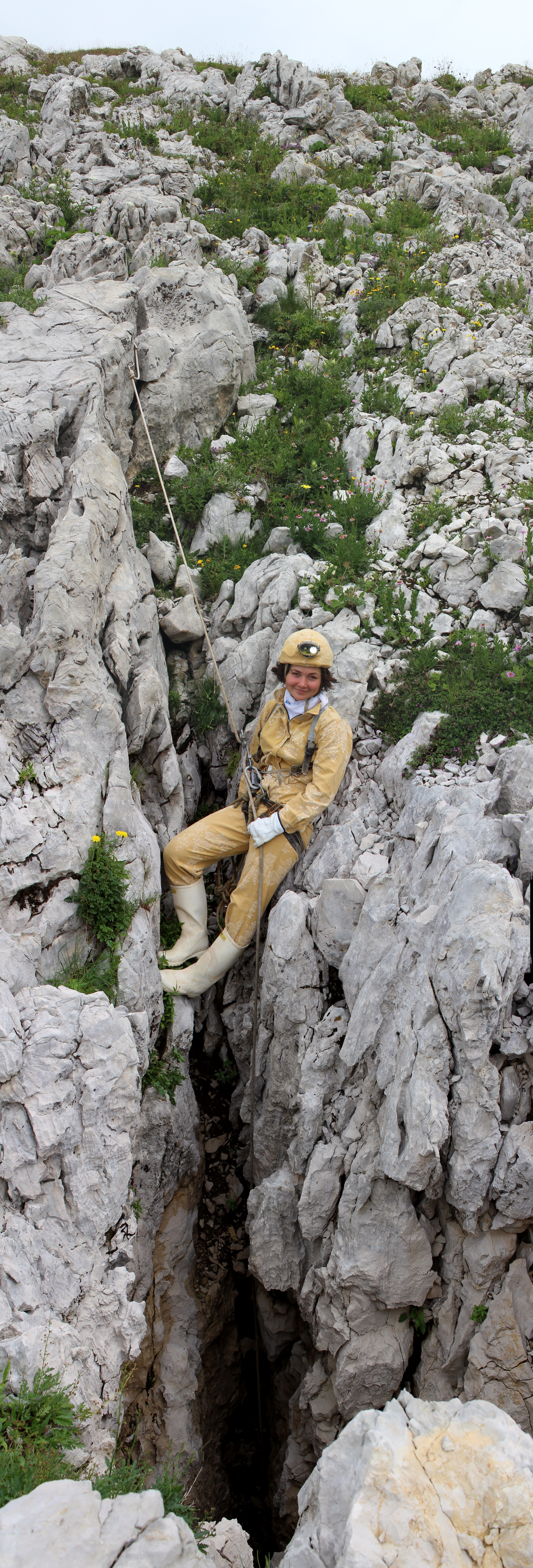
Arabika, 2259 m

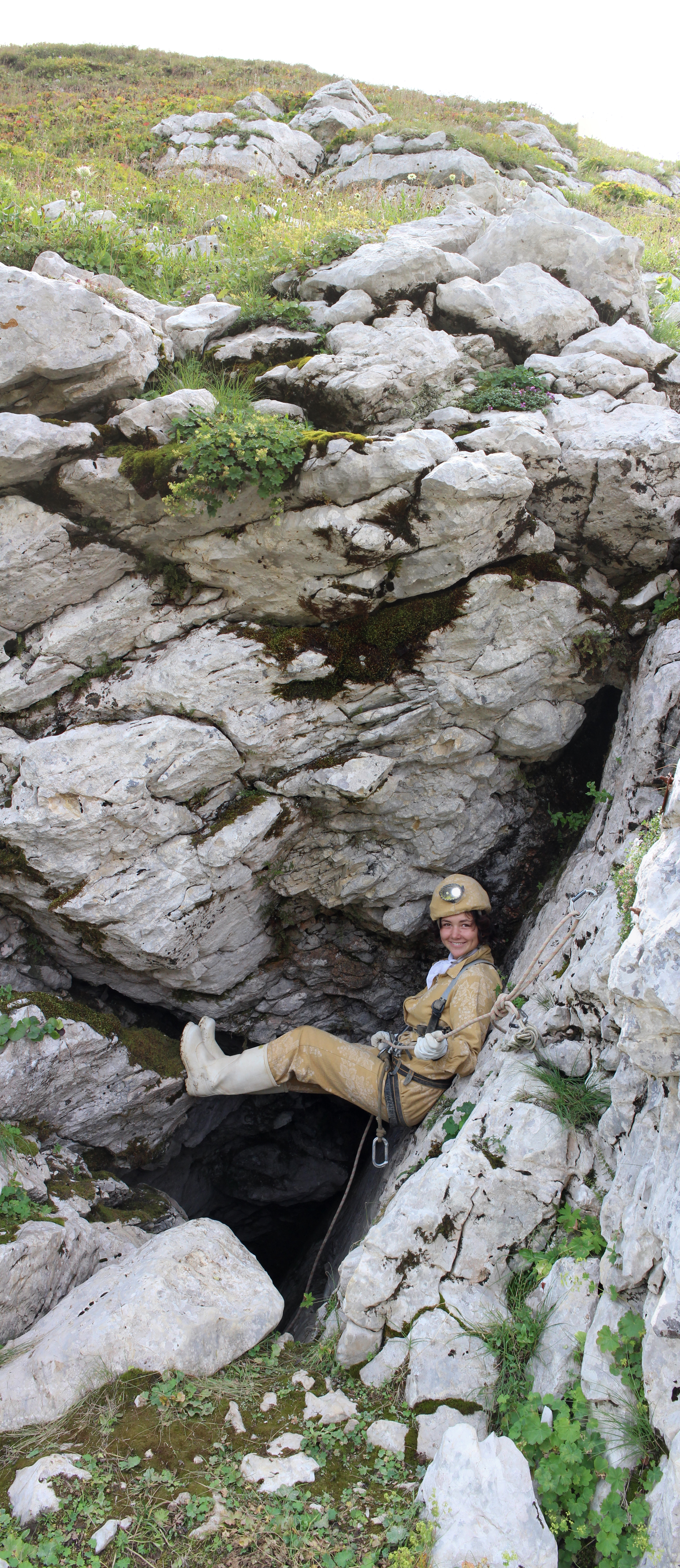
Gnomov, 2206 m

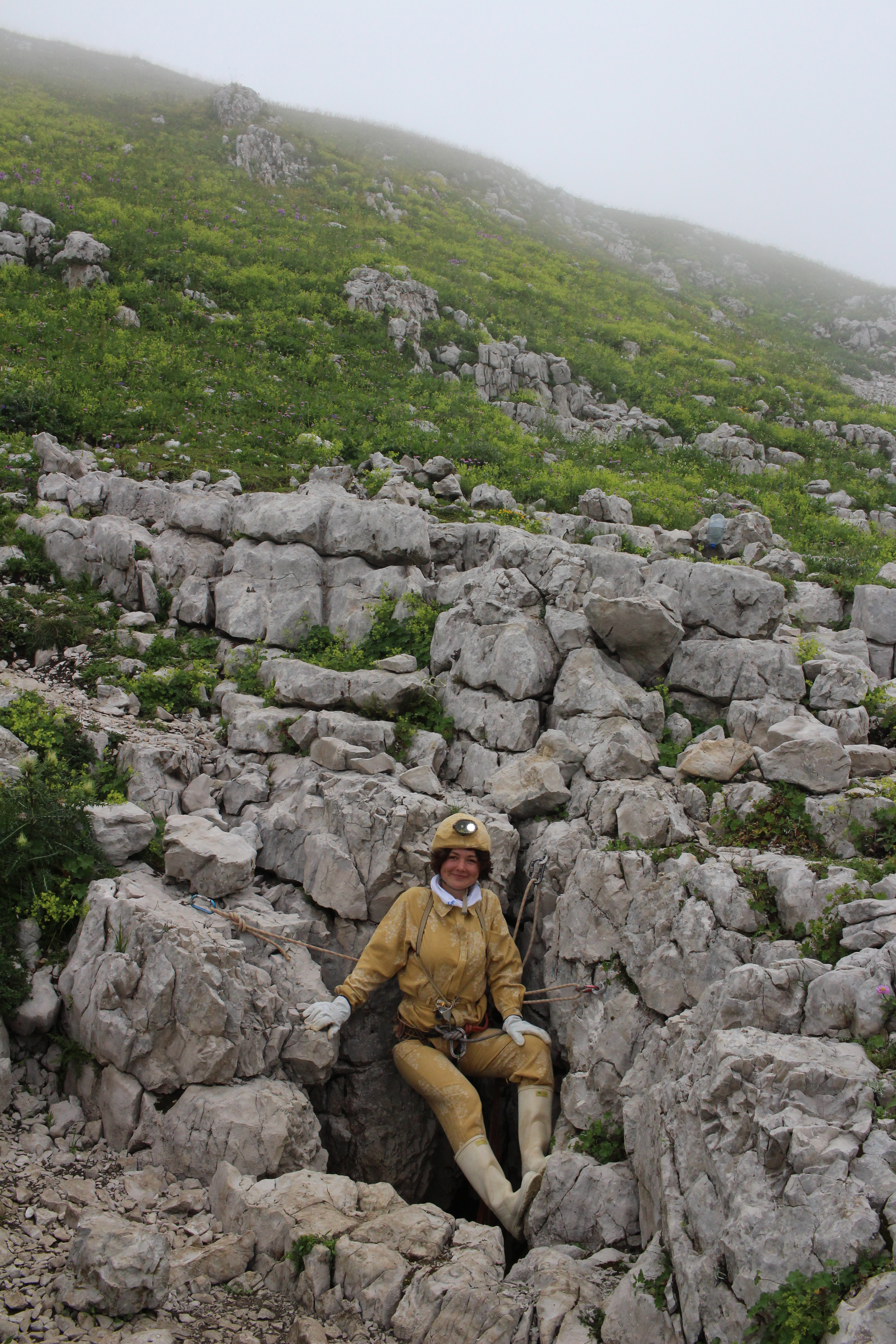
Kujbyševskaja, 2180 m

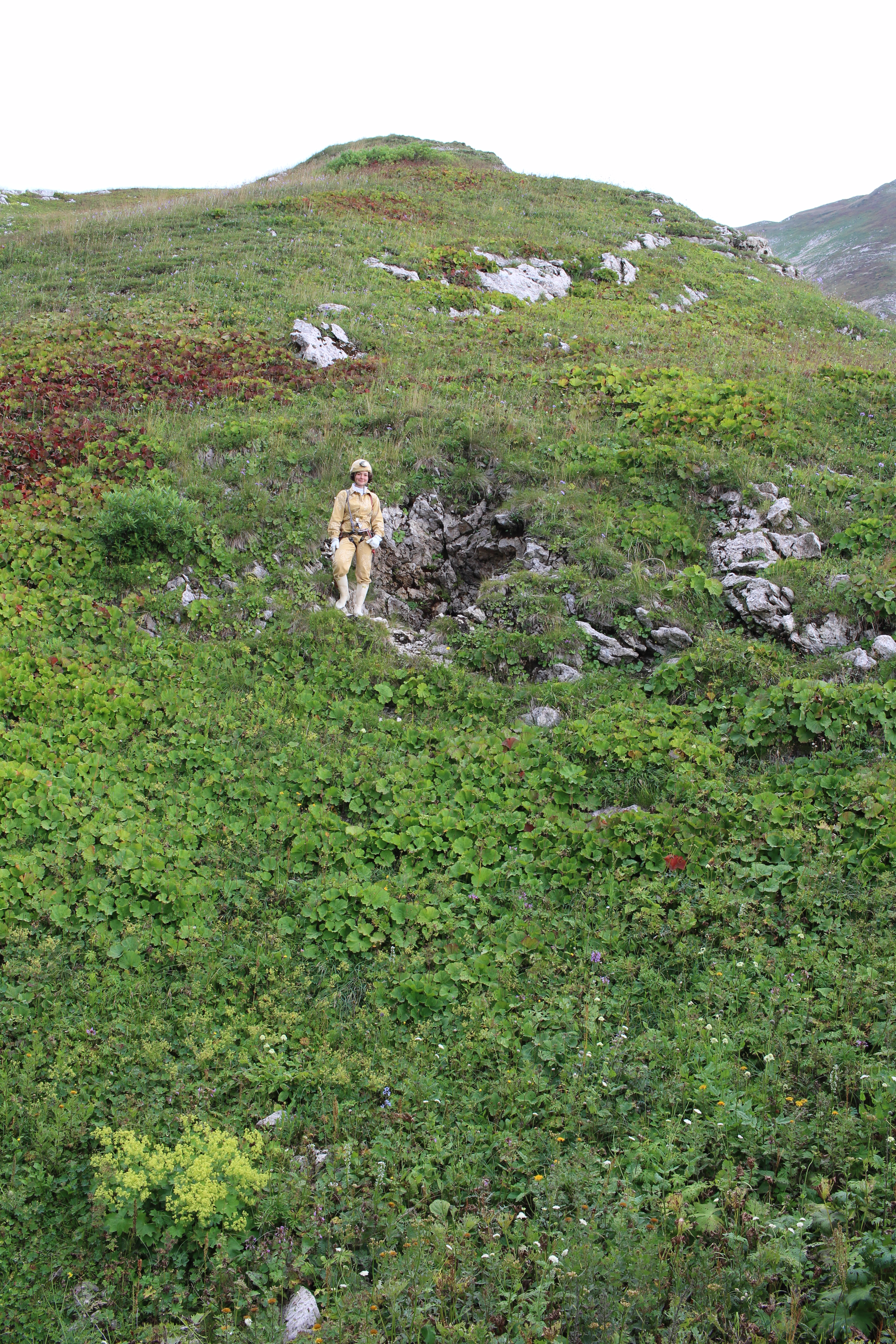
Detskaja, 2140 m

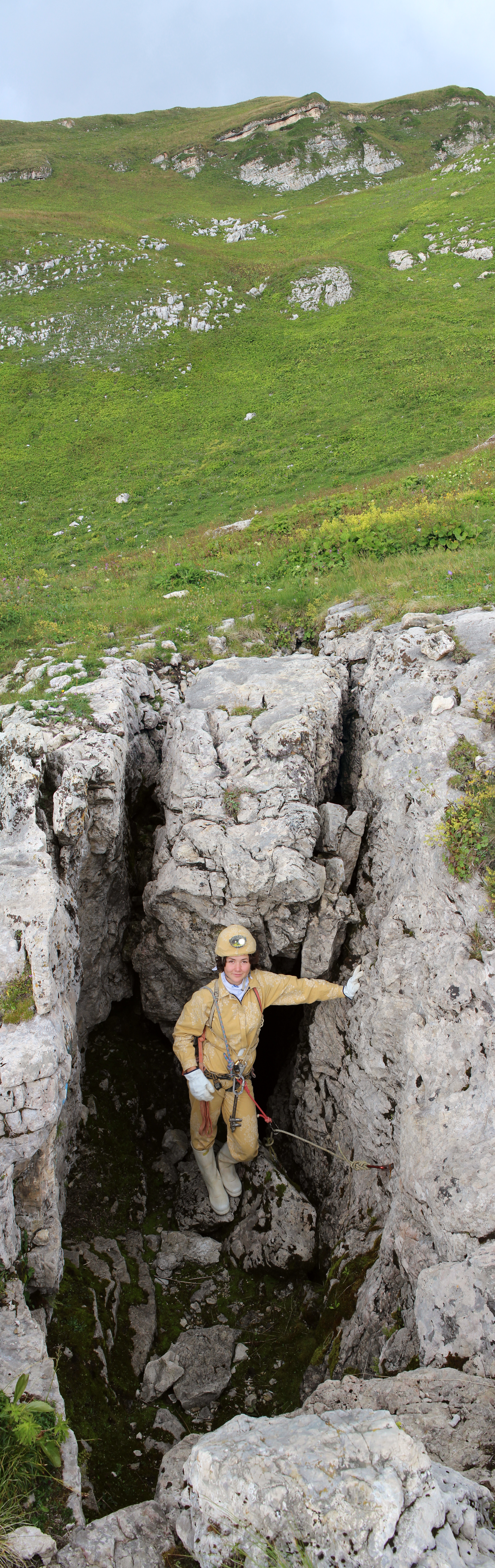
Genrihova bezdna, 2110 m

== Hydrogeology ==
Major on-shore karst springs with individual average discharges of 1 to 2.5 m^{3}/s (35 to 88 cu ft/s) are located at altitudes ranging from 1 m (3 ft 3 in) (Reprua Spring) to 540 m (1,770 ft) (Gega waterfall). Two of them are located in the shore area; these are Reprua (average discharge 2.5 m^{3}/s or 88 cu ft/s; altitude 1 m or 3 ft 3 in above sea level) and Kholodnaja Rechka (1.2 m^{3}/s or 42 cu ft/s; 50 m or 160 ft a.s.l.). Two more major springs are located in the river canyons bordering Arabika to the east: Goluboe Ozero in the Bzyb canyon (2.5 m^{3}/s or 88 cu ft/s; 90 m or 300 ft a.s.l.) and Gega waterfall in the Gega canyon (1 m^{3}/s or 35 cu ft/s; 540 m or 1,770 ft a.s.l.). There are also several smaller springs in the Gagra town. The Reprua River, one of the shortest rivers in the world, about 60 feet (18 m) long, starts in the cave and flows toward the Black Sea.

Some boreholes located along the shore of the Black Sea yield karstic groundwater from depths of 40–280 m (130–920 ft) below sea level. Other much deeper boreholes tapped low-salinity karstic waters at depths of 500 and 1,750 m (5,740 ft) in the Khashupse Valley near Gantiadi and 2,250 m (7,380 ft) near Gagra. This suggests the existence of a deep karst system and vigorous karst groundwater circulation at depth.

Submarine springs are known in the Arabika area, emerging from the floor of the Black Sea in front of the massif. Shallow springs at depths of 5–7 m (16–23 ft) can be reached by free dive near Gantiadi. Tamaz Kiknadze (1979) reported submarine springs near the eastern part of Gagra at depth of 25–30 m (82–98 ft) and Buachidze and Meliva (1967) revealed submarine discharge at depths up to −400 m (−1,300 ft) by hydrochemical profiling. Recently an outstanding feature of the sea floor topography near Arabika has been revealed from a digital bathymetric map that combines depth soundings and high-resolution marine gravity data. This is a huge submarine depression in front of the Zhovekvara River mouth, which has dimensions of about 5 km × 9 km (3.1 mi × 5.6 mi) and a maximum depth of about 380 m (1,250 ft). The Arabika Submarine Depression is a closed feature with internal vertical relief of about 120 m (390 ft) (measured from its lowest rim) separated from the abyssal slope by the bar at a depth of about 260 m (850 ft). It has steep northern and northeastern slopes (on the side of the massif) and gentle south and southwestern slopes. Its formation is apparently karstic. Presently this depression seems to be a focus of submarine discharge of the karst systems of Arabika.

The speleological explorations and a series of dye tracing experiments conducted during the 1980s under the coordination of Alexander Klimchouk have radically changed previous notions of the hydrogeology of Arabika, revealed its outstanding speleological perspectives and strongly stimulated further efforts for exploration of deep caves. Tracers injected in the Kujbyshevskaja Cave and the Iljukhina System were detected in the Kholodnaja Rechka and Reprua springs, proving groundwater flow to the south-southwest across major tectonic structures over a distance of 13–16 km (8.1–9.9 mi) as the crow flies. The tracer from Kujbyshevskaja Cave was also detected in a borehole located between these two springs, which yields groundwater from a depth of 200 m (660 ft) below sea level. This has been interpreted as an indication of the connection of the cave with the submarine discharge. The large "Central Karst Hydrologic System", which encompasses most of the southeastern flank of the Arabika anticline, had been identified in this way. The system became the deepest in the world with its overall vertical range of about 2,500 m (8,200 ft) (measuring to the borehole water-bearing horizon) or even 2,700 m (8,900 ft) (measuring to the deepest reported submarine discharge points).

Another tracer was injected in the Moskovskaja Cave and detected at the Gegsky Vodopad spring, indicating the presence of a karst hydrologic system comprising the northeastern flank of the Arabika anticline (the "Northern System"). No connections have been revealed with yet another major spring, Goluboje Ozero in the Bzyb River canyon, although it apparently drains a large area of the eastern sector of the massif (the hypothetical "Eastern Karst Hydrological System"). It is not clear where Sarma Cave (−1,550 m; −5,090 ft) drains to, Goluboje Ozero to the southeast or Reprua to the southwest, at the shore.

The results of the dye-tracing tests demonstrated that groundwater flow is not subordinate to the fold structure but is largely controlled by faults that cut across the strike of major folds, and that the large part of the central sector of Arabika is hydraulically connected to the springs along the seashore and with submarine discharge points.

Krubera Cave has an extremely steep profile and reveals a huge thickness of the vadose zone. The lower boundary of the vadose zone (the top of the phreatic zone) is at an elevation of about 110 m (360 ft) at low flow, which suggests a low overall hydraulic gradient of 0.007-0.008. Low-TDS groundwater is tapped by boreholes in the shore area at depths of 40–280 m (130–920 ft), 500 m (1,600 ft), 1,750 m (5,740 ft), and 2,250 m (7,380 ft) below sea level, which suggests the existence of a deep flow system with vigorous flow. Submarine discharge along the Arabika coast is reported at depths up to around 400 m (1,300 ft) below sea level.

It is difficult to interpret these facts in terms of the development of karst systems controlled by contemporary sea level, or within the range of its Pleistocene fluctuations (up to −150 m [−490 ft]). In combination with the existence of the Arabika Submarine Depression, all these facts point to the possibility that karst systems in Arabika could have originated in response to the Messinian salinity crisis (5.96–5.33|Ma}}) when the Black Sea (Eastern Paratethys) could have almost dried up, as did the adjacent Mediterranean, where the dramatic sea level drop of around 1,500 m (4,900 ft) is well established.

== Biology ==
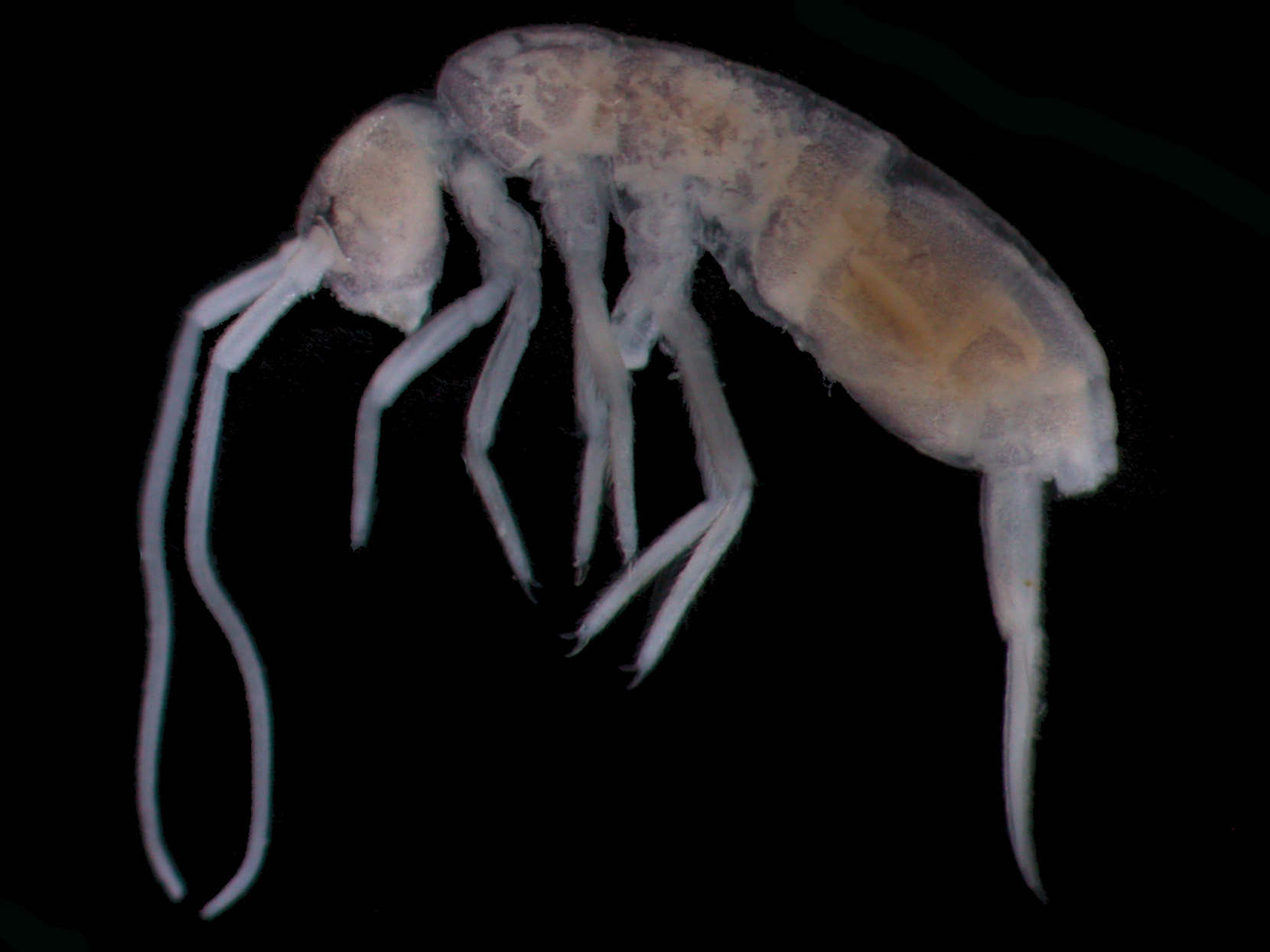
Plutomurus ortobalaganensis

The animal diversity of Krubera-Voronja is composed of more than 12 species of arthropods of several groups, such as pseudoscorpions, spiders, opiliones, crustaceans, springtails, beetles and dipterans. Krubera-Voronja cave is inhabited by endemic species, including four springtails discovered during the CAVEX Team expedition of 2010: Anurida stereoodorata, Deuteraphorura kruberaensis, Schaefferia profundissima, and Plutomurus ortobalaganensis; the last of these is the deepest terrestrial animal ever found on Earth, living 1,980 metres (6,500 ft) below the cave entrance. The leiodid beetle Catops cavicis inhabits Krubera-Voronja and also several caves around the Ortobalagan Valley at depths of −1,600 metres (−5,200 ft). The flying dipteran Trichocera maculipennis is the only invertebrate that has been recorded at all depths of the cave system, from the surface down to the deepest unflooded part of the cave. The subterranean amphipod crustacean Kruberia abchasica caught by Gennady Samokhin in August 2013, during dives in the siphon 'Dva Kapitana', dwells at the deepest part of the Krubera Cave at a depth of −2,175 metres (−7,136 ft). Many of these species exhibit clear troglomorphic traits such as reduced or absent eyes and depigmentation.

Surveys of the microbial communities of the Krubera-Voronja cave system reveal high bacterial diversity at both the phylum and genus levels, with the composition of bacterial phyla being heavily dependent on both depth and the frequency of human visits. 24 phyla of bacteria have been identified throughout the cave system, with the most common at all depths and regions of the cave being Acidobacteria, Actinobacteria, Bacillota, and Pseudomonadota.

The subsurface biotic community is heavily dependent on surface sources of organic carbon that come from water percolating from the surface, sinking streams that enter the cave system, and the activities of animals that move in and out of the caves.

== History of exploration ==
=== Early exploration ===
At the beginning of the 20th century, Arabika was visited by French speleologist Édouard-Alfred Martel, who published several works about the massif. In 1909–10 Russian karst scientist Alexander Kruber, a founder of the study in Russia, performed some field studies in Arabika. He published his observations in a series of Arabika-specific papers and several monographs. During the subsequent 50 years no special studies were undertaken of the karst and caves in the region, although the karst of Arabika was referred to in many works dealing with regional geology and hydrogeology.

=== 1960s ===
In the early 1960s, Georgian geographers led by Levan Maruashvili began exploring caves in the high sector of the massif. Among several other caves, they made the first exploration of an open-mouthed 60 m (200 ft) shaft in the Ortobalagan Valley and named it after Alexander Kruber. The first explorers were stopped by impassable squeezes at −95 m (−312 ft) in a meandering passage which led off from the foot of the entrance shaft. The cave remained largely neglected over the next 20 years, although occasionally visited by cavers from various caving clubs. Before 1980 there were no caves deeper than 310 m (1,020 ft) known in Arabika.

=== 1980s ===
The new era in cave explorations in the Arabika Massif began in 1980 when the Kiev Speleological Club, led by Alexander Klymchuk, started exploring caves there. They adopted an approach to cave search and exploration which included thorough investigations in a defined area and systematic testing of cave limits, through digging in boulder chokes and enlarging squeezes which had previously obstructed exploration. The Ortobalagan Valley had been selected as a primary focus for the Ukrainian efforts. This approach, followed in subsequent years by other caving clubs which joined exploration activity in different parts of Arabika, resulted in the discovery of many deep caves including five caves deeper than 1,000 m (3,300 ft).

In the Ortobalagan Valley, the Ukrainian cavers made breakthroughs in Kuybyshevskaya Cave at −160 m (−520 ft) and pushed it to −1,110 m (−3,640 ft) by 1986 through a series of massive boulder chokes. They broke through a formerly impassable squeeze at −120 m (−390 ft) in Genrikhova Bezdna Cave and eventually connected it to Kuybyshevskaya at −956 m (−3,136 ft) in 1987. The resultant system has been named the Arabikskaya System.

From 1982 onwards, the Kiev cavers started systematically working in Krubera Cave, located less than 200 meters from the Kuybyshevskaya entrance, hoping to connect with the Arabikskaya System and increase its total depth by 60 m (200 ft). Exploration progressed slowly because critically tight meanders between the pits required enormous amounts of work to widen them to a passable size. The cave was pushed to −340 m (−1,120 ft) during 1982–1987. Two "windows" in a vertical shaft at depths of 220–250 m (720–820 ft) were documented on the cave map but remained unexplored. During this time the cave received its second, alternative name Voronja (Russian for 'Crows'') Cave, owing to the number of crows nesting in the entrance shaft.

=== 1990s–early 2000s ===
The political and ethnic conflict in Abkhazia during 1992–94 resulted in instability and border problems which continued over subsequent years. This suspended speleological explorations in Arabika. Some stabilization of the situation in 1998 has since enabled a renewal of exploration efforts to take place in the region.

In 1999, the expedition of the Ukrainian Speleological Associations (Ukr. S.A.) led by Jurij Kasjan (also spelled Yuriy Kasyan) made a major breakthrough in Krubera Cave by discovering and exploring two branches behind the windows at a depth of 220–250 m (720–820 ft). These branches stretched in two different directions. The "Main Branch" was explored to −740 m (−2,430 ft) and the "Nekuybyshevskaya Branch" to −500 m (−1,600 ft).

In 2000, the Main Branch was quickly pushed by the multi-stage expedition of the Ukr. S.A. in August to −1,200 m (−3,900 ft) and in September to −1,410 m (−4,630 ft).

In January 2001, the Ukr.S.A. expedition explored the cave to −1,710 m (−5,610 ft) making it the deepest cave in the world. For the first time in the history of speleology, the deepest cave in the world had been established outside of Western Europe. Since 2001, the Krubera explorations by the Ukr.S.A. have been undertaken within the frame of the multi-year project named "The Call of the Abyss", coordinated by A. Klimchouk, Y. Kasyan, G. Samokhin and K. Markovskoy. Besides the Ukrainian speleologists, cavers from many countries such as France, Spain, Russia, Moldova, Bulgaria, United Kingdom, Ireland, Israel and Lithuania have taken part in different expeditions of the Ukr.S.A.

=== 2001 onwards ===
The major events in the exploration of Krubera Cave in subsequent years were as follows:

==== 2001 ====
- August: the Ukr.S.A. expedition led by Jurij Kasjan. Four underground camps established in the cave: in the Main Branch at −500 m (−1,600 ft), −1,200 m (−3,900 ft) and −1,400 m (−4,600 ft) and in the Nekujbyshevskaja Branch at −500 m (−1,600 ft). Systematic inspection and probing of potential leads in the deep sections of the Main Branch; climbing in the Lamprechtsofen tributary; digging in the boulder choke in the Nekuybyshevskaya Branch.

==== 2003 ====
- August: the expedition of the Kiev Speleological Club and the CAVEX team. Tested and passed a sump at −1,440 m (−4,720 ft) (now known as Sump 1), explored the post-sump section to roughly −1,660 m (−5,450 ft), continued climbing in the Lamprechtsofen tributary.

==== 2004 ====
- July: the CAVEX team started their separate explorations, beyond the Ukr.S.A. project, in Krubera Cave. Continued exploring a section beyond Sump 1 at −1,410 m (−4,630 ft) and reached the next sump (Sump 2 – "Blue Lake") at depth claimed to be −1,840 m (−6,040 ft). The depth of that point according to the subsequent Ukr.S.A. survey is −1,775 m (−5,823 ft).
- August: the Ukr.S.A. expedition led by Nikolay Solovyov and Alexander Klimchouk. In the Main Branch, surveyed the post-sump series, established a camp at −1,640 m (−5,380 ft), discovered a lead to a new section ("The Way to the Dream") and explored to −1,840 m (−6,040 ft). Explored the Uzhgorodskaya Series in the upper part of Krubera by climbing an 80-meter (260 ft) high shaft in the Meander Krym. Continued working in the Nekuybyshevskaya Branch.
- October: the Ukr.S.A. expedition led by Jurij Kasjan. In the Main Branch, discovered a lead into a new section beyond the Big Junction at −1,790 m (−5,870 ft). Explored this section named "Windows" to a blind chamber called "Game Over" at −2,080 m (−6,820 ft). The depth mark of −2,000 m (−6,600 ft) had been passed for the first time in the history of speleology.

==== 2005 ====
- February–March: the Ukr. S.A. expedition led by Jurij Kasjan. In the Main Branch, continued exploring the "Windows" series where many side leads and several sumps were tested. A sump at −1,980 m (−6,500 ft) called "Kvitochka" was passed by Nikolay Solovyov, and a continuation found behind it.
- July: the CAVEX team expedition. Explored the section beyond the Kvitochka Sump to a further sump called Dva Kapitana ("Two Captains") at −2,140 m (−7,020 ft).
- August: the Ukr. S.A. expedition led by Nikolay Solovyov. Continued digging and broke through the boulder choke at −500 m (−1,600 ft) in the Nekuybyshevskaya Branch, explored it to the next boulder choke at −640 m (−2,100 ft).
- October: the Ukr.S.A. expedition led by Jurij Kasjan. The exploration beyond the Kvitochka Sump had been cancelled due to a sudden flood. Established a camp at −1,960 m (−6,430 ft). Performed a verification survey to −1,200 m (−3,900 ft) by hydrolevelling to assess the precision of the standard Ukr.S.A. survey (the Russian Geographic Society group). Continued climbing in the Lamprechtsofen tributary to +210 m (690 ft) relative to the junction.

==== 2006 ====
- August–September: the Ukr.S.A. expedition coordinated by Jurij Kasjan. In the Main Branch the terminal sump called Dva Kapitana ("Two Captains") was tested by Gennadiy Samokhin to a depth of 17 m (56 ft), which extended the total depth of Krubera Cave to 2,158 m (7,080 ft). In the Nekuybyshevskaya Branch, a group led by Kyryl Markovskoy broke through the boulder choke at −640 m (−2,100 ft) and explored a continuation to −1,004 m (−3,294 ft).

==== 2007 ====
- January: the CAVEX team expedition. Performed a dive in the terminal "Dva Kapitana" sump and claimed it to reach −30 m (−98 ft) depth below the water table. However, characteristics of morphology of the underwater passage reported by the team were not confirmed by the subsequent exploration, and no safety line was found deeper than 16 m (52 ft).
- August–September: the Ukr.S.A. expedition led by Jurij Kasjan. In the Main Branch, Gennadiy Samokhin dived the terminal "Dva Kapitana" Sump for a length of 140 m (460 ft) and depth of −46 m (−151 ft), which set the new depth for Krubera Cave at 2,191 m (7,188 ft). After an elbow at −35 m (−115 ft) the underwater passage continues to depth under steep angle. Also in the deep parts of the Main Branch, several side passages and sumps at various depths were explored. In a side branch which previously ended at 1,775 m (5,823 ft) by the "Blue Lake" sump, a series of air-filled passages was explored behind the sump, separated by six intermediary sumps. The farthest sump, "Yantarny", was explored for 130 m (430 ft) in length and 19.5 m (64 ft) in depth and continues. The deepest point in this branch has been reached at −1,841 m (−6,040 ft). In the Nekuybyshevskaya Branch, a group led by Kyryl Markovskoy continued exploring new leads and extended the depth of this branch to −1,293 m (−4,242 ft).

==== 2008 ====
- September: the Ukr.S.A. expedition led by Jurij Kasjan. Explored the Nekuybyshevskaya Branch to a depth of 1,390 m (4,560 ft). An international scientific expedition "Towards the Centre of the Earth", led by Lithuanian Aidas Gudaitis (Aenigma), descended the main branch as far as −1,800 m (−5,906 ft), placing water level loggers at siphons here and in the "Chamber of Soviet Speleologists" at −1,710 m (−5,610 ft).

==== 2009 ====
- August–September: the Ukr.S.A. expedition led by Jurij Kasjan further pushed the Nekuybushevskaya Branch to a siphon at a depth of 1,557 m (5,108 ft). The international "Towards the Centre of the Earth" expedition led by Aidas Gudaitis returned to the main branch to collect data from water level loggers, swap their locations and push exploration in the "Spanish branch" near camp 1400. 2008–2009 data collected from 1,710 m (5,610 ft) and 1,800 m (5,900 ft) indicated that the sump levels rose in two distinct periods: continuously from May–July 2009 and with an isolated pulse in October 2008, both sumps reaching a maximum flood depth of 12 m (39 ft). New logger locations at depths of 1,800 m (5,900 ft), 1,980 m (6,500 ft) (Kvitochka sump) and 2,140 m (7,020 ft) (Dva Kapitana's sump).

==== 2010 ====
- July–August: The CAVEX Team Summer expedition led by Konstantin Mujin performed the first biospeleological studies in the Krubera-Voronya cave. The biospeleological studies led by the cave biologists Ana Sofia Reboleira and Alberto Sendra, provided the deepest subterranean arthropods of the Earth.
- August: During "Towards the Centre of the Earth" expedition led by Aidas Gudaitis, a Lithuanian member of Aenigma caving club Saulė Pankienė became the first woman to dive Kvitochka sump at 1,980 m (6,500 ft), and subsequently to descend to the "Two Captains" sump at a depth of 2,140 m (7,020 ft). Water level measurement results of 2009–2010, collected during this expedition, showed that the water level rose up to 228 m (748 ft) above the sump "Two Captains" during June 2010. Data logging devices were installed by Irish members of the expedition near to the entrance of the cave, to log surface conditions and enable correlation of data between surface and underground locations. "Spanish Branch" exploration was completed and a limit was reached with 131 m (430 ft) total passage surveyed.

==== 2012 ====
- August: A team of 59 spent 27 days exploring Krubera. Including members from nine different countries, the team set up a series of camps underground. Ukrainian cave diver Gennady Samokhin was responsible for reaching a new world depth record of −2,199 metres (−7,215 ft).

==== 2024 ====
- August: total denivelation of the cave was reported to be –2224 metres after repeated survey of the whole cave and subsequent dive in the bottom sump.

== See also ==
- Geography of Abkhazia
- Geography of Georgia
- List of caves
- Speleology
- List of deepest caves

== Bibliography ==
- Buachidze, I.M., and Meliva, A.M. 1967. To the question of groundwater discharge into the Black Sea in the Gagra area. Trudy laboratorii gidrogeologii I inzhenernoy geologii Gruzinskogo politechnicheskogo instituta, 3, 33–39.
- Kiknadze, T. Z. 1972. Karst of the Arabika massif. Metzniereba, Tbilisi, 245 p. (in Russian).
- Kiknadze, T.Z. 1979. Geology, Hydrogeology and activity of limestone karst. Metzniereba, Tbilisi, 232 p. (in Russian).
- Klimchouk, A. B. 1984. On impact of the late Quaternary glaciations on the karst development of the Arabika massif (Caucasus). Izvestia VGO (Leningrad), 116 (2), 165¬–170 (in Russian).
- Klimchouk, A. B. 1990. Karst circulation systems of the Arabika massif. Peschery (Caves), inter-university scientific transactions, Perm: Perm University, 6–16 (in Russian)
- Klimchouk, A.B. 2006. The deepest cave in the world in the Arabika Massif and the evolution of the Black Sea. Svet (Light), 2 (31), 33–36 (in Russian).
- Klimchouk, A. 1991. Le grotte del massiccio di Arabika. La Rivista del CAI, 112(1), 37–47.
- Klimchouk, A.B. 2004. Krubera (Voronja) Cave, Georgia. In: Gunn, J. (Ed.). Encyclopedia of Cave and Karst Science. New York - London: Fitzroy Dearborn – Taylor and Francis Books.
- Klimchouk, A. and Kasjan, Yu. 2001. In a search for the route to 2000 meters depth: The deepest cave in the World in the Arabika massif, Western Caucasus. Nat. Speleol. Soc. News (USA), 59 (9). 252–257.
- Klimchouk, A. and Kasjan, Yu. 2004. Krubera: il piu profondo abisso del mondo (Alla ricerca del −2000 metri nel massiccio di Arabika). La Rivista del CAI, 71–75.
- Klimchouk A.B. and Kasjan Yu.M. 2006. Distribution of temperature in karst systems: data from deep caves of the Arabika Massif. Geologichny Zhurnal (Geological Journal), 1, 108–115, Kyiv (Ukraine) (in Russian).
- Klimchouk, A.B., Samokhin, G.V., and Kasjan Yu.M. 2008. The deepest cave in the word Krubera and its hydrogeological and paleogeographic significance. Speleology and Karstology, 1, 100–104. Simferopol (Ukraine) (in Russian).
- Kruber, A. A. 1911. Karabi-Yuajla and the Arabika massif. Zemlevedenie (Moscow), 18(3) (in Russian).
- Kruber, A. A. 1912a. The voyage to Arabika. Estestvoznanie i geografia (in Russian).
- Kruber, A. A. 1912b. From observations of karst in the vicinity of Gagra and Karabi-Yuajla. Zemlevedenie (Moscow), 19 (1–2) (in Russian).
- Martel, E. A. 1909. La Côte d’Azur Russe (Riviera du Caucase). Ch. XVI: La massif de l'Arabika, Paris.
- Maruashvili, L. I., Tintilozov, Z. K., and Changashvili, G. Z. 1961. The results of speleological explorations carried out in 1960 on the Arabika limestone massif. Izvestia AN GSSR (Tbilisi), XXVI (5) (in Russian).
- Maruashvili, L. I., Tintilozov, Z. K., and Changashvili, G. Z. 1962. Karst and ancient glaciation in Arabika. Abstracts of papers of the second scientific session of speleologists. Tbilisi: AN GSSR (in Russian).
- Maruashvili, L. I., and Tintilozov, Z. K. 1963. The results of the recent speleological explorations in the karstic belt of the Western Georgia in 1957–1960. Zemlevedenie (Moscow), nov. ser. VI (in Russian).
- Sendra, Alberto and Ana Sofia P.S. Reboleira. 2012. The world's deepest subterranean community - Krubera-Voronja Cave (Western Caucasus). International Journal of Speleology, 41 (2): 221–230.
- Tabor, James M. Blind Descent. The Quest to Discover the Deepest Place on Earth. New York: Random House, 2010.
