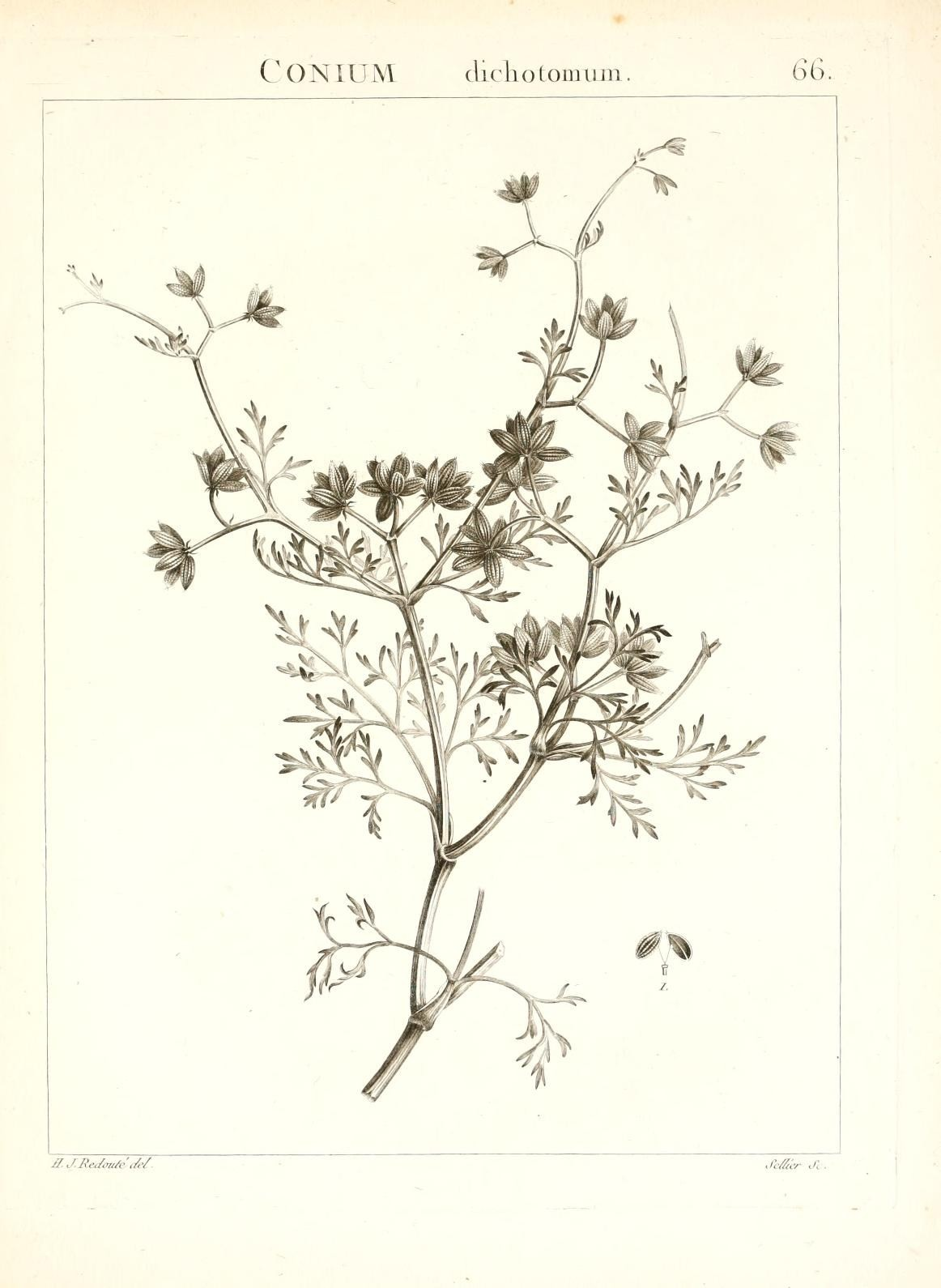

Scientific classification
- Kingdom: Plantae
- Clade: Embryophytes
- Clade: Tracheophytes
- Clade: Spermatophytes
- Clade: Angiosperms
- Clade: Eudicots
- Clade: Asterids
- Order: Apiales
- Family: Apiaceae
- Subfamily: Apioideae
- Genus: Krubera; Hoffm.
- Species: K. peregrina

Binomial name
- Krubera peregrina (L.) Hoffm.

Synonyms
- Genus synonymy: Timoron Raf.; Ulospermum Link; Species synonymy: Cachrys dichotoma (Desf.) Spreng.; Cachrys peregrina (L.) Spreng.; Capnophyllum dichotomum (Desf.) Lag.; Capnophyllum peregrinum (L.) Lange; Cicuta dichotoma (Desf.) Poir.; Conium dichotomum Desf.; Krubera leptophylla Hoffm.; Timoron dichotomum (Desf.) Raf.; Tordylium peregrinum L.; Ulospermum dichotomum (Desf.) Link

= Krubera peregrina =

Species of plant

Krubera peregrina is a species of plants in the family Apiaceae. It is the only species in the genus Krubera.

== Taxonomy ==
The genus name of Krubera is in honour of Johann Julius Kruber (d. 1826), a doctor and botanist in Moscow, Russia. The Latin specific epithet of peregrina is derived from Latin 'Peregrinus, is a name originally meaning "one from abroad", that is, a foreigner, traveller, or pilgrim.

It was first described and published in Gen. Pl. Umbell. on page 103 in 1814. Then the species was published in Man. Fl. Madeira Vol.1 on page 361 in 1864.

== Sources ==
This article incorporates text from a free content work. Licensed under CC0 (license statement/permission). Text taken from Krubera peregrina. Encyclopedia of Life.
