= List of Dicyrtomidae species =

Wikimedia kist article

This is a list of species in the springtail family Dicyrtomidae.

== Dicyrtoma (Bourlet, 1841) ==
A Dicyrtoma fusca found in WA

- Dicyrtoma aurata (Mills, 1934)
- Dicyrtoma bellingeri Snider, 1990
- Dicyrtoma brevifibra Snider, 1990
- Dicyrtoma flammea Maynard, 1951
- Dicyrtoma fusca (Lubbock, 1873)
- Dicyrtoma fuscus (Lubbock, 1873)
- Dicyrtoma hageni (Folsom, 1896)
- Dicyrtoma kauaiensis (Snider, 1990)
- Dicyrtoma longidigita Snider, 1990
- Dicyrtoma madestris Snider, 1990
- Dicyrtoma microdentata Snider, 1990
- Dicyrtoma mithra Wray, 1949
- Dicyrtoma opalina (Folsom, 1896)
- Dicyrtoma pineolae (Wray, 1946)

*

- Dicyrtoma quadrangularis Mills, 1934
- Dicyrtoma rossi (Wray, 1952)
- Dicyrtoma serrata (Snider, 1990)
- Dicyrtoma sylvestratilis Snider, 1990
- Dicyrtoma tesselata Snider, 1990

== Dicyrtomina (Börner, 1903) ==
- Dicyrtomina africana Womersley, 1931

Dicyrtomina saundersi found in WA state

- Dicyrtomina cyanea Merlo & Najt, 1974
- Dicyrtomina dorsolineata R.Latzel, 1917
- Dicyrtomina ealana Marlier, 1945
- Dicyrtomina flavosignata (Tullberg, 1871)
- Dicyrtomina gigantisetae Lin & Xia, 1985
- Dicyrtomina insularis Carpenter, 1934
- Dicyrtomina minuta (O.Fabricius, 1783)
- Dicyrtomina murphyi (C.Delamare Deboutteville & Z.Massoud, 1965)
- Dicyrtomina nigra Bretfeld, 2000
- Dicyrtomina novazealandica J.T.Salmon, 1941
- Dicyrtomina ochrea H.Womersley, 1939
- Dicyrtomina ornata (H.Nicolet, 1842)

- Dicyrtomina platensis (Merlo & Najt, 1974)
- Dicyrtomina saundersi (J.Lubbock, 1862)
- Dicyrtomina signata Stach, 1919
- Dicyrtomina spec (Nicolet, 1842)
- Dicyrtomina torsolimata Latzel, 1917
- Dicyrtomina tuberculata Womersley, 1933
- Dicyrtomina turbotti Salmon, 1948
- Dicyrtomina venusta R.Latzel, 1917
- Dicyrtomina violacea (Krausbauer, 1898)

== Ptenothrix (Boerner, 1906) ==
- Ptenothrix albosignata (Parona, 1888) Stach, J, 1957:90

Ptenothrix species 6 found in King County, WA, USA

- Ptenothrix alveola (Lucas, H, 1846:255) Janssens F, 2020:mihi
- Ptenothrix annulata Lin & Xia, 1985
- Ptenothrix argentina Delamare Deboutteville & Massoud, 1963:281
- Ptenothrix atra (Linnaeus, C, 1758) Börner, 1906
- Ptenothrix australis Snider, RJ, 1990:247
- Ptenothrix beta (Christiansen, K & Bellinger, P, 1981) Christiansen, K & Bellinger, P, 1998
- Ptenothrix blidana Bretfeld, G, 2001:119
- Ptenothrix borincana Soto-Adames, FN, 1988:65
- Ptenothrix brasiliensis Delamare Deboutteville & Massoud, 1963:285
- Ptenothrix brouquissei Nayrolles, 1989
- Ptenothrix californica (Christiansen, K & Bellinger, P, 1981:1234) Christiansen, K & Bellinger, P, 1998:1408
- Ptenothrix castanea Snider, RJ, 1985

Ptenothrix maculosa found in King County, WA, USA

- Ptenothrix catenata (Schött, 1921) Richards, 1968
- Ptenothrix cavicola Cassagnau, P et Delamare Deboutteville, C, 1955:392
- Ptenothrix ciliata Stach, J, 1957:102
- Ptenothrix ciliophora Yosii, R et Lee, C-E, 1963:17
- Ptenothrix corynophora Börner, C, 1909:130
- Ptenothrix curvilineata (Wray, 1949) Snider, RJ, 1990:256
- Ptenothrix dalii Zeppelini D, Ferreira AS et Oliveira JVLC in Oliveira, JVLC, Ferreira, AS et Zeppelini, D, 2020:2
- Ptenothrix deharvengi Nayrolles, 1989
- Ptenothrix delongi (Christiansen & Bellinger, 1981) Christiansen, K & Bellinger, P, 1998:1409
- Ptenothrix denticulata (Folsom, JW, 1899:268) Börner, C, 1909:131
- Ptenothrix dinghuensis Lin & Xia, 1985
- Ptenothrix dominicana Mari Mutt, JA, 1977:285
- Ptenothrix dorsalis (Reuter, OM, 1876:85) Linnaniemi, 1912
- Ptenothrix fiscellata Handschin, 1925
- Ptenothrix flavescens (Axelson, 1905)
- Ptenothrix fuscamaculata Bretfeld & Trinklein, 2000
- Ptenothrix gaoligongshanensis Itoh, R et Zhao, L-J, 2000:156
- Ptenothrix gibbosa Börner, C, 1906:185
- Ptenothrix gracilicornis (Schäffer, C, 1898:423) Börner, 1903
- Ptenothrix hawaiiensis Snider, RJ, 1990:74
- Ptenothrix higashihirajii Yosii, R, 1965:67
- Ptenothrix higumai Yosii, R, 1965:68
- Ptenothrix himalayensis Yosii, 1966
- Ptenothrix huangshanensis Chen, J-X et Christiansen, K, 1996:587
- Ptenothrix iriomotensis Uchida, H, 1965:92
- Ptenothrix janthina Börner, C, 1909:132
- Ptenothrix keralae Prabhoo, 1971
- Ptenothrix koreanensis Jo, S-H et Park, K-H, 2023:126
- Ptenothrix kuraschvilii Djanaschvili, 1970
- Ptenothrix lactea Uchida, 1953
- Ptenothrix leucostrigata Stach, J, 1957:98
- Ptenothrix macomba Wray, 1967
- Ptenothrix maculosa (Schott, 1891)
- Ptenothrix marmorata (Packard, 1873) Mills, HB, 1934
- Ptenothrix mongolica Yosii, 1954
- Ptenothrix monochroma Yosii, R et Lee, C-E, 1963:20
- Ptenothrix narumii Uchida, 1940
- Ptenothrix nigricornis (Ionesco, 1916) Stach, J, 1957:91
- Ptenothrix ocellata (Becker, 1902)
- Ptenothrix palawanensis Yosii, R, 1969:223
- Ptenothrix palmata (Folsom, JW, 1902) Stach, J, 1957
- Ptenothrix palmisetacea Lin & Feng, 1985
- Ptenothrix plumiseta Kang J-S et Lee B-H in Kang, J-S, Lee, B-H et Park, K-H, 2005:235
- Ptenothrix quadrangularis (Mills, HB, 1934:106)
- Ptenothrix renateae Snider, RJ, 1985
- Ptenothrix reticulata Stach, J, 1957:105
- Ptenothrix rubra Bretfeld & Trinklein, 2000
- Ptenothrix ryoheii Uchida, 1953
- Ptenothrix saxatilis Yosii, R et Lee, C-E, 1963:19
- Ptenothrix setosa (Krausbauer, 1898:24) Handschin, B, 1929:125
- Ptenothrix simplificata Stach, 1957
- Ptenothrix sinensis Lin & Feng, 1985
- Ptenothrix tateyamana Uchida, H, 1958:76
- Ptenothrix texensis (Packard, AS, 1873:42) Stach, J, 1957:80
- Ptenothrix tranvansoii Yoshii, 1994
- Ptenothrix tricycla Uchida, 1953
- Ptenothrix tsutsuii Yosii, R, 1955:398
- Ptenothrix unicolor (Harvey, 1893) Folsom, 1928
- Ptenothrix utingae Arlé & Guimaraes, 1976
- Ptenothrix vinnula Uchida, H, 1957:26
- Ptenothrix violacea Handschin, 1929
- Ptenothrix violaceopa Hüther, 1967
- Ptenothrix vittata (Folsom, 1896) Folsom, 1934
- Ptenothrix yakushimana Yosii, R, 1965:65
- Ptenothrix yunnana Itoh, R et Zhao, L-J, 2000:159
- Ptenothrix Species 6 (Christiansen & Bellinger,1980)

== Jordanathrix Bretfeld & Arbea, 1999 ==

- Jordanathrix articulata (Ellis, WN, 1974:148) Bretfeld G & Arbea JI in Bretfeld, G, 1999:148, t.t.

== Calvatomina Yosii, 1966 ==
*

- Calvatomina alacris (Yosii, R, 1969:229)
- Calvatomina andrewarthai (Womersley, H, 1932:39) Betsch, J-M, 1980:147
- Calvatomina antenna Nguyen, 2017
- Calvatomina bellingeri (Snider, RJ, 1990:90)
- Calvatomina bougainvilleae (Yosii, 1960) Betsch, J-M, 1980:147
- Calvatomina brevifibra
- Calvatomina calva
- Calvatomina christianseni
- Calvatomina cruciata
- Calvatomina discolor
- Calvatomina formosana
- Calvatomina gladiata
- Calvatomina guyanensis
- Calvatomina lawrencei
- Calvatomina longidigita
- Calvatomina madestris
- Calvatomina microdentata
- Calvatomina modesta
- Calvatomina monodi
- Calvatomina nymphascopula
- Calvatomina opalina
- Calvatomina oryzae
- Calvatomina pagoda
- Calvatomina pallida
- Calvatomina pseudorufescens
- Calvatomina rossi
- Calvatomina rufescens
- Calvatomina scutellina
- Calvatomina solomonensis
- Calvatomina strigata
- Calvatomina superba
- Calvatomina sylvestratilis
- Calvatomina tesselata
- Calvatomina trivandrana
- Calvatomina tuberculata
- Calvatomina virgata
- Calvatomina yaeyamensis
