= Peter F. Bellinger =

American entomology professor

Peter F. Bellinger (1924–2017) was an American entomology professor who specialized in Collembola.

He worked on the four volume series "The Collembola of North America, North of the Rio Grande: A Taxonomic Analysis" which he published with Kenneth A. Christiansen.

He also wrote the publication "A catalog of the Neotropical Collembola, including Nearctic areas of Mexico" in 1990 in collaboration with José A. Mari Mutt.

Together they described multiple species in the genus Ptenothrix. Bellinger also published papers on species of Entomobrya.

Bellinger and Christiansen merged the species Folsomia silvestrii with Folsomia prima in 1980.

the Maddonna cave Springtail, a springtail found in Illinois in a singular cave system; was described by Douglas Zeppelini and Kenneth Christiansen in the 2003 publication "Arrhopalites (Collembola: Arrhopalitidae) in U.S. caves with the description of seven new species. Journal of Cave and Karst Studies 65(1):36-42."

== Career ==
Bellinger was a forward observer in World War II with the United States Army, where he ranked corporal. After the war he went to Harvard University. He then transferred to Harvard, eventually obtaining a Harvard PHD in Collembology.

== Literature ==
Bellinger described many species of springtails alongside University of California professor Christiansen . This eventually accumulated to their final publication of C&B in 1998. He helped review Frans Janssen's website Collembolla.org.

== Species described ==
- Ptenothrix delongi (Christiansen & Bellinger, 1981)
- Ptenothrix californica (Christiansen & Bellinger, 1981)
- Ptenothrix beta (Christiansen & Bellinger, 1981)
