= Ptenothrix atra =

- Ptenothrix atra found in Biddeford, Maine

Scientific classification
- Kingdom: Animalia
- Phylum: Arthropoda
- Clade: Pancrustacea
- Class: Collembola
- Order: Symphypleona
- Family: Dicyrtomidae
- Genus: Ptenothrix
- Species: P. atra

Binomial name
- Ptenothrix atra (Linnaeus, 1758)

Species of Entognatha

Ptenothrix atra is a species of springtail in the genus Ptenothrix found in Europe and the East Coast of North America, though it has been reported in the West Coast as well.

This species was described by Carl Linnaeus in 1758 in his publication Systema Naturae under the name Podura atra.

== Description ==
This species is strongly pigmented purple or orangey yellow. It has a faint kite pattern made up by small spots towards the back of the springtail, and an extremely faint dorsal line or diamond. It has hairier than average antenna for Ptenothrix. other features are microscopic.

== Similar species ==
This species is confused with the also strongly pigmented Ptenothrix unicolor and the European purple form of Dicyrtoma fusca which it shares the range of in both the United States (in which Dicyrtoma fusca is introduced) and Europe (where Dicyrtoma fusca originates.). Ptenothrix unicolor differs in both antennal shape, and lighter coloration. Dicyrtoma fusca is larger, more purple, and has completely different antennae. Other features are microscopic.
