= Ptenothrix unicolor =

- Ptenothrix unicolor found in Agusta, GA

Scientific classification
- Kingdom: Animalia
- Phylum: Arthropoda
- Clade: Pancrustacea
- Class: Collembola
- Order: Symphypleona
- Family: Dicyrtomidae
- Genus: Ptenothrix
- Species: P. unicolor

Binomial name
- Ptenothrix unicolor (Harvey, 1893)

Species of springtail

Ptenothrix unicolor is a species of springtail in the genus Ptenothrix endemic to North America. It is found in the Midwest and East Coast of the United States.

Its purple to yellowish overall, with a light arrow pattern on the back, and spots near the back of the abdomen. it is very hairy on the antenna. the tip of the antenna looks like a squiggle under a microscope, as opposed to the straight antennal tips on species such as Ptenothrix beta, or Ptenothrix maculosa.

This species has all the features of Ptenothrix species but because of its coloration it gets mistaken for Dicyrtoma fusca and similar species that have purple coloration. The latter have different coloration, less hair on their bodies, and no light arrow pattern.
