= Ptenothrix palmata =

Scientific classification
- Kingdom: Animalia
- Phylum: Arthropoda
- Clade: Pancrustacea
- Class: Collembola
- Order: Symphypleona
- Family: Dicyrtomidae
- Genus: Ptenothrix
- Species: P. palmata

Binomial name
- Ptenothrix palmata (Folsom, 1902)

Species of springtail

Ptenothrix palmata is a species of springtail in the family Dicyrtomidae. They are found in the Arctic, Subarctic, and North America.

== Appearance ==
This species has yet to be seen in a color photo, as it was formerly mistaken for Ptenothrix maculosa. It wasn't until 1902 where Folsom first described it. Its original description referred to this species as a purple alpine species of Ptenothrix. This was eventually generalized to suggest that all small, purple Ptenothrix in the west were Ptenothrix palmata, notably Ptenothrix maculosa "grapes".

== Confusion ==
The result of this confusion is that many websites such as BugGuide and Collembolla.org are incorrect in their assessments of what qualifies as Ptenothrix palmata, since they still use the old tentative taxonomy, before the species was keyed out to Ptenothrix maculosa via C&B.
