= Ptenothrix macomba =

Scientific classification
- Kingdom: Animalia
- Phylum: Arthropoda
- Clade: Pancrustacea
- Class: Collembola
- Order: Symphypleona
- Family: Dicyrtomidae
- Genus: Ptenothrix
- Species: P. macomba

Binomial name
- Ptenothrix macomba (Wray, 1967)

Species of springtail

Ptenothrix macomba is a species of springtail in the genus Ptenothrix endemic to the East Coast of North America.

== Description ==
It is generally cream in coloration, with brown patterning. towards the top of the abdomen there is a "airplane" pattern, banding on the sides and on the face and small antenna. at least one variant in Florida supposedly has double stripes down the abdomen though this is likely an old missidentification of Ptenothrix curvilineata. other distinguishing features are microscopic.
