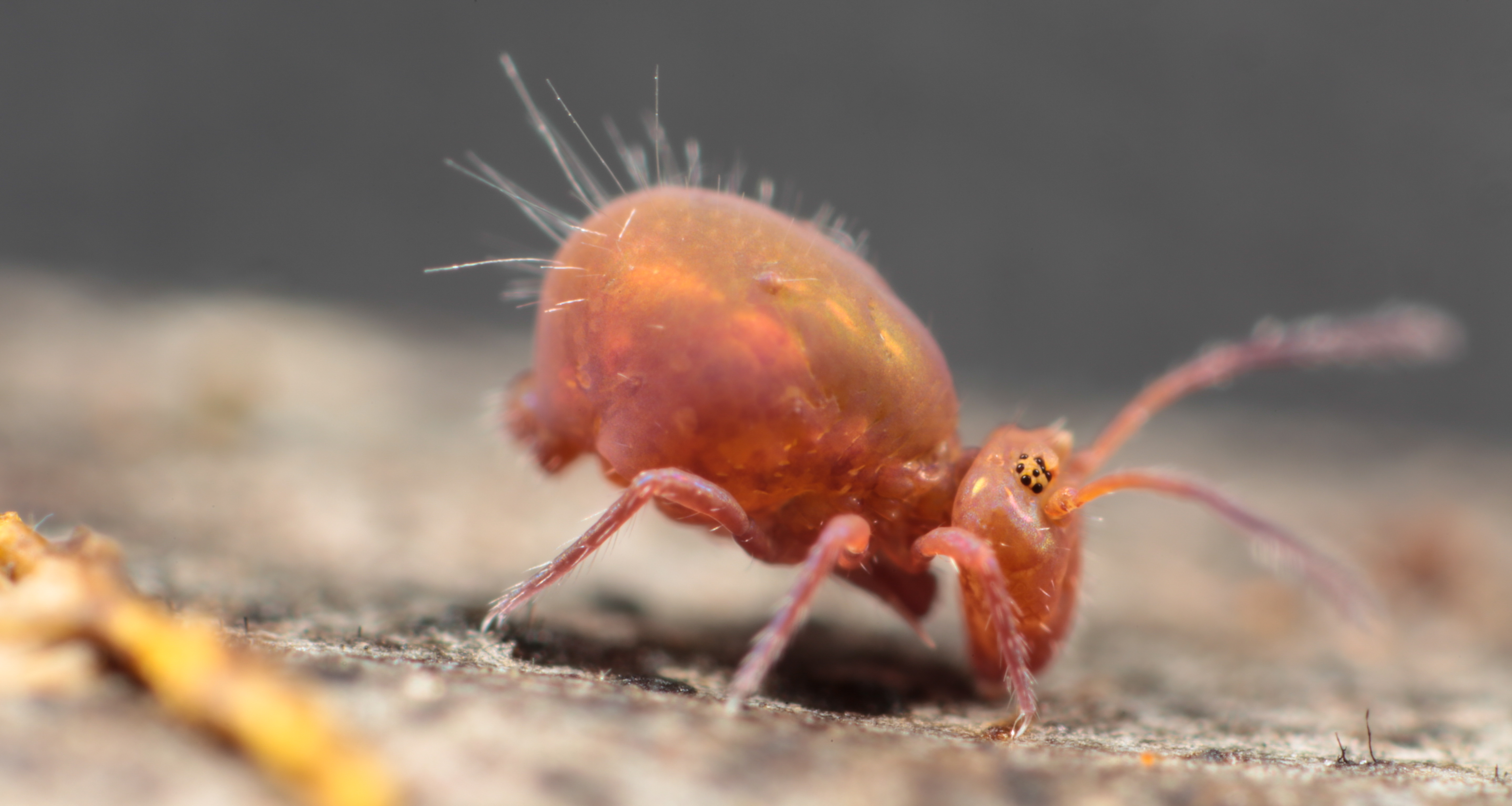
- Calvatomina rufescens

Scientific classification
- Domain: Eukaryota
- Kingdom: Animalia
- Phylum: Arthropoda
- Class: Collembola
- Order: Symphypleona
- Family: Dicyrtomidae
- Subfamily: Dicyrtominae

= Dicyrtominae =

Subfamily of springtails

Dicyrtominae is a subfamily of globular springtails in the family Dicyrtomidae. There are at least 3 genera and 30 described species in Dicyrtominae.

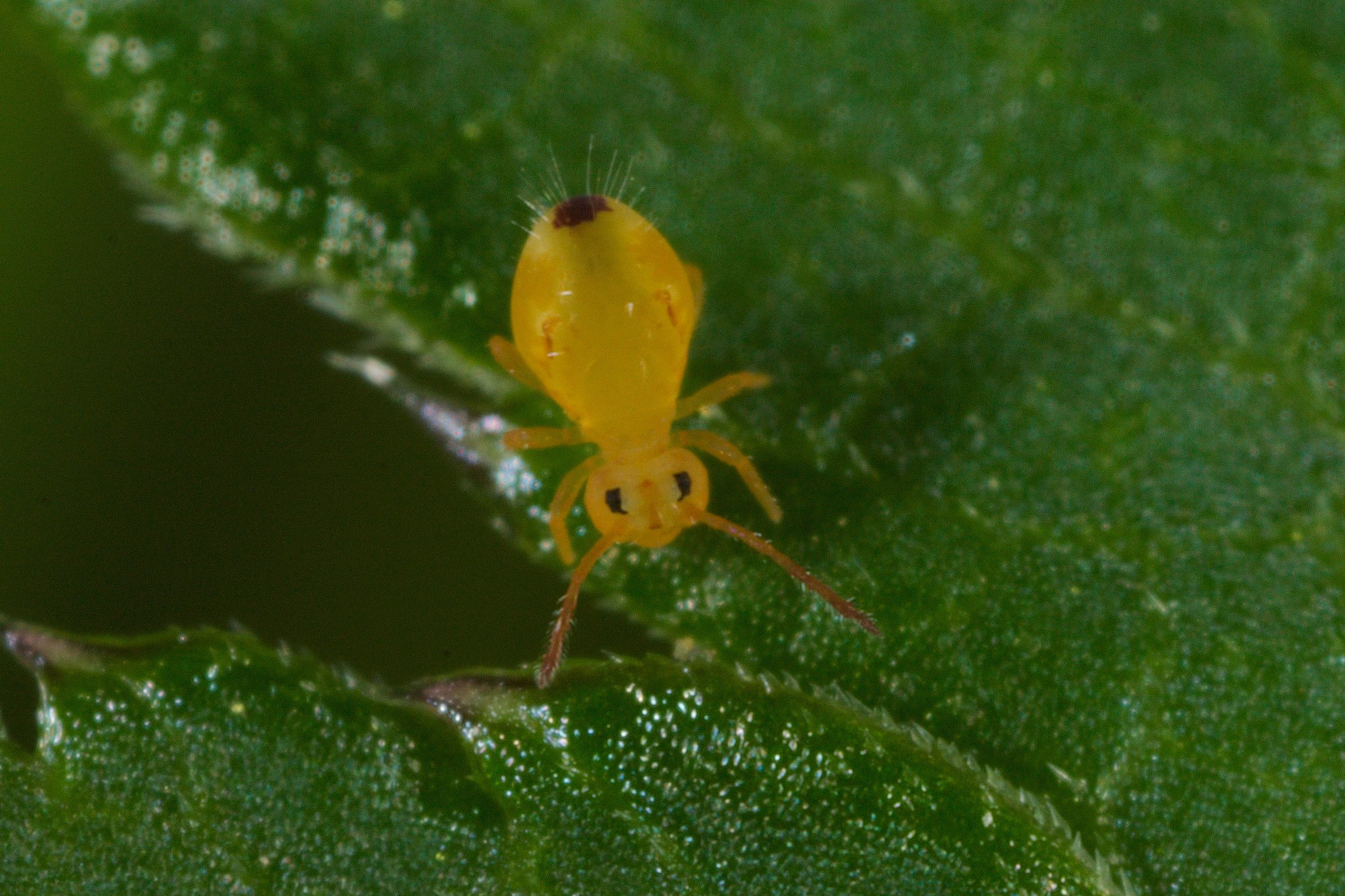
Dicyrtomina minuta

== Genera ==
- Calvatomina
- Dicyrtoma Bourlet, 1841
- Dicyrtomina Börner, 1903
