= Ptenothrix californica =

Scientific classification
- Kingdom: Animalia
- Phylum: Arthropoda
- Clade: Pancrustacea
- Class: Collembola
- Order: Symphypleona
- Family: Dicyrtomidae
- Genus: Ptenothrix
- Species: P. californica

Binomial name
- Ptenothrix californica (Christiansen & Bellinger, 1981)

Species of springtail

Ptenothrix californica is a species of springtail in the genus Ptenothrix. It is endemic to the Pacific Coast, from British Columbia to the tip of Mexico.

== Appearance ==
It is identified by its reticulated pattern shaped like a turnip down the middle, and dark sideburns with yellow spots. It has the characteristic spikey antenna of the Ptenothrix genus, and in many cases, striped legs.

== Diet ==
This species will eat driftwood and decaying wood depending on where in the range they are found.

== Habitat ==
This species lives off of decaying wood in California, but shifts to living under driftwood in its range from Oregon to British Columbia. It is one of the few springtails that have specialized to living on the beach outside of its California range.

== History ==
This is one of the many species that were labeled under the umbrella term "Ptenothrix maculosa" before microscopy was preformed by citizen scientists in 2025. The result was the discovery of this species and many others in the west coast such as P. delongi and P. beta, as well as the undescribed Ptenothrix "Spaceman".

== Description ==
this species was originally described as Dicyrtoma californica. It was named by Kenneth A. Christiansen and Dr. Peter F. Bellinger in 1981, and was later formally published in C&B. the original type specimen was collected near Baja California.
