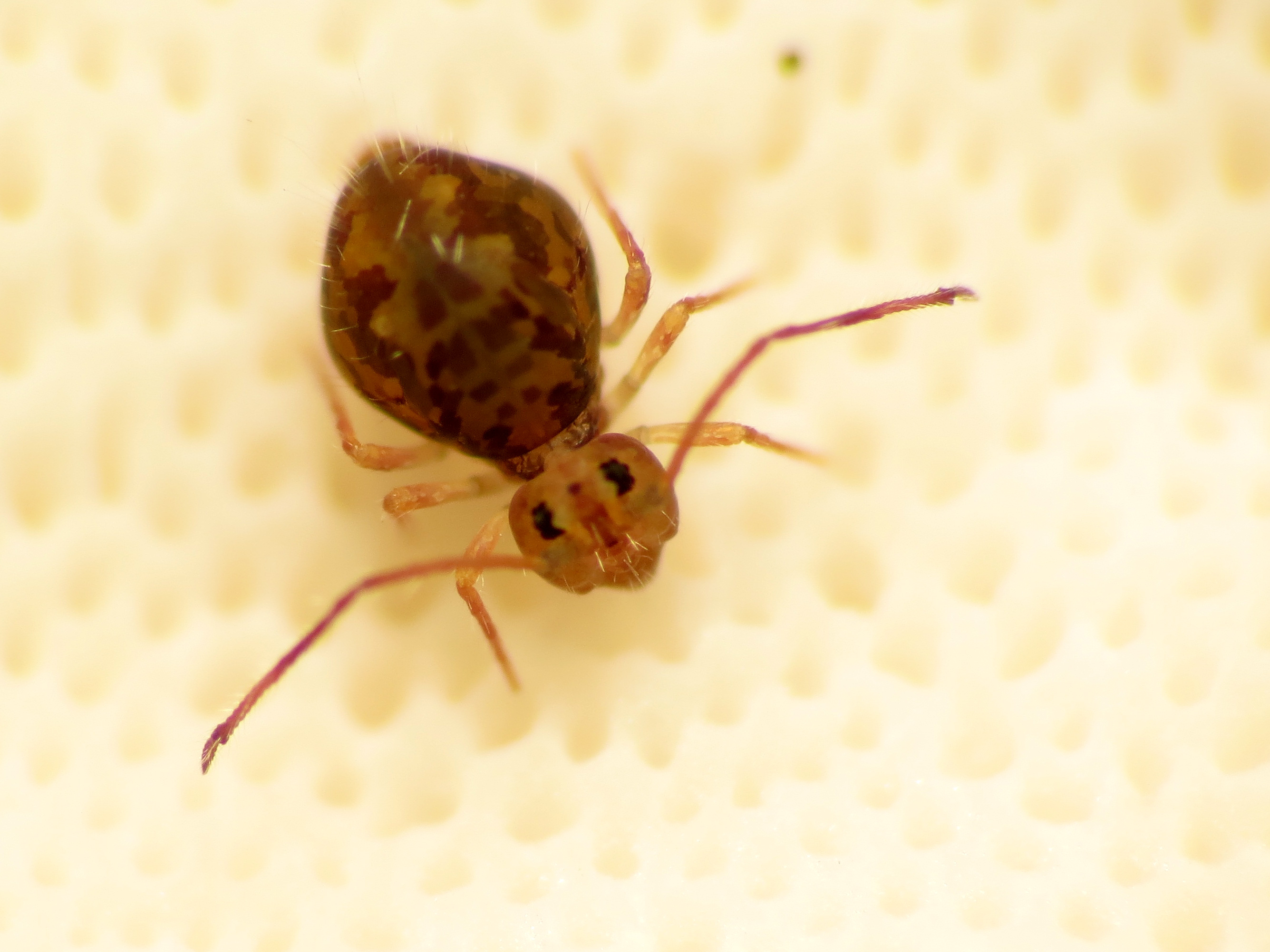
- Ptenothrix beta

Scientific classification
- Kingdom: Animalia
- Phylum: Arthropoda
- Clade: Pancrustacea
- Class: Collembola
- Order: Symphypleona
- Family: Dicyrtomidae
- Subfamily: Ptenothricinae
- Genus: Ptenothrix; Boerner, 1906

= Ptenothrix =

Genus of springtails

Ptenothrix is a genus of globular springtails in the family Dicyrtomidae. There are about 92 described species in Ptenothrix worldwide.

== Appearance ==
This genus is very diverse with many different color patterns. Many species vary in pattern and so sometimes microscopy can reveal that visually different specimens are conspecific. Some species have mottled abdomens, for example, Ptenothrix delongi, while others such as Ptenothrix alveola are checkered, but are relatively consistent in appearance. Others can have completely different colors altogether as in the case of Ptenothrix maculosa. Some species are more uniform in coloration over the whole body, like Ptenothrix unicolor and Ptenothrix atra. While certain species can be identified by color pattern alone, identification generally requires more than just color. Other traits important for identification of species include the tip of the antenna, which is prominent and not usually hairy, shoulder hairs, the hairs near the back, and a hunched back.

== Microscopic identification ==
This genus is defined by a cluster of traits, most pertaining to chaetotaxy. These traits are as follows: large abdomen without a protuberance, with a full set of bothriotricha and posteriorly covered with small acanthoid chaetae, head and abdomen with at least some large acanthoid chaetae, hind tibiotarsus with 2–3 modified serrated chaetae, claws usually with no tunica, outer and inner chaetae on the dens often serrated, and no neosminthuroid chaetae.

== State of taxonomy ==

There is a lot of outdated information on Ptenothrix species. The way that these species were originally described and identified was via chaetotaxy. Springtail expert Frans Jessens created a website to tracked every springtail called Collembola.org. He decided to create the website to visually tentatively identify every species of springtail on Earth. The result was many different lists only containing pictures on the website with the rare comment or two on some species. The issue was that without the original chaetotaxy being done before identification, many previously described species of Ptenothrix were accidentally labelled as undescribed based off their pattern. In 2021 a group of citizen scientists used microscopy to discover that all the species that Jessans called undescribed were in fact different patterns of the variable species Ptenothrix maculosa. Additionally, in many cases Jessans had placed specimens of Ptenothrix beta, Ptenothrix delongi, and Ptenothrix californica under the species name Ptenothrix maculosa, because his original tentative ID was incorrect. The result was that various citizen scientists across the Pacific Northwest had to use The Collembola of North America, North of the Rio Grande: A Taxonomic Analysis - 4 Volumes, a book set where every then known west coast species was redescribed. After 2 years of effort keying the species, eventually the different species taxonomy on Collembola.org was updated to align with the original keys.

== Resources ==
Sage Osterling has since created a website called Mesofauna of the Pacific Coast, peer reviewed by other members of the community that have keyed out these species. It is used as a simple guide for beginners who are getting into studying springtails. It also includes some more recently rediscovered color forms and unknown species discovered over iNaturalist via microscopy and multiple observations, the color forms observations which have since been confirmed by GBIF under the normal species.

BugGuide provides many identification suggestions and tips, but many of them may not be entirely true in groups when they have not been reviewed in depth. Many BugGuide records of springtails such Ptenothrix are out of date since the group is rarely studied.

The most reliable key to these species is The Collembola of North America, North of the Rio Grande: A Taxonomic Analysis - 4 Volumes which was written by Kenneth Christiansen and Peter Bellinger, the former experts on west coast springtails. It contains keys that the springtail community uses to key out various species, especially Ptenothrix species and many others.

== Original description ==
The genus Ptenothrix was formally described by Carl Julius Bernhard Börner in 1906. Species known prior to 1906 had been originally placed in Papirius (Lubbock, 1862) and Dicyrtoma (Bourlet, 1842).

== Species ==
These species belong to the genus Ptenothrix:

- Ptenothrix albosignata (Parona, 1888) Stach, J, 1957:90
- Ptenothrix alveola (Lucas, H, 1846:255) Janssens F, 2020:mihi
- Ptenothrix annulata Lin & Xia, 1985
- Ptenothrix argentina Delamare Deboutteville & Massoud, 1963:281
- Ptenothrix atra (Linnaeus, C, 1758) Börner, 1906
- Ptenothrix australis Snider, RJ, 1990:247
- Ptenothrix beta (Christiansen, K & Bellinger, P, 1981) Christiansen, K & Bellinger, P, 1998
- Ptenothrix blidana Bretfeld, G, 2001:119
- Ptenothrix borincana Soto-Adames, FN, 1988:65
- Ptenothrix brasiliensis Delamare Deboutteville & Massoud, 1963:285
- Ptenothrix brouquissei Nayrolles, 1989
- Ptenothrix californica (Christiansen, K & Bellinger, P, 1981:1234) Christiansen, K & Bellinger, P, 1998:1408
- Ptenothrix castanea Snider, RJ, 1985
- Ptenothrix catenata (Schött, 1921) Richards, 1968
- Ptenothrix cavicola Cassagnau, P et Delamare Deboutteville, C, 1955:392
- Ptenothrix ciliata Stach, J, 1957:102
- Ptenothrix ciliophora Yosii, R et Lee, C-E, 1963:17
- Ptenothrix corynophora Börner, C, 1909:130
- Ptenothrix curvilineata (Wray, 1949) Snider, RJ, 1990:256
- Ptenothrix dalii Zeppelini D, Ferreira AS et Oliveira JVLC in Oliveira, JVLC, Ferreira, AS et Zeppelini, D, 2020:2
- Ptenothrix deharvengi Nayrolles, 1989
- Ptenothrix delongi (Christiansen & Bellinger, 1981) Christiansen, K & Bellinger, P, 1998:1409
- Ptenothrix denticulata (Folsom, JW, 1899:268) Börner, C, 1909:131
- Ptenothrix dinghuensis Lin & Xia, 1985
- Ptenothrix dominicana Mari Mutt, JA, 1977:285
- Ptenothrix dorsalis (Reuter, OM, 1876:85) Linnaniemi, 1912
- Ptenothrix fiscellata Handschin, 1925
- Ptenothrix flavescens (Axelson, 1905)
- Ptenothrix fuscamaculata Bretfeld & Trinklein, 2000
- Ptenothrix gaoligongshanensis Itoh, R et Zhao, L-J, 2000:156
- Ptenothrix gibbosa Börner, C, 1906:185
- Ptenothrix gracilicornis (Schäffer, C, 1898:423) Börner, 1903
- Ptenothrix hawaiiensis Snider, RJ, 1990:74
- Ptenothrix higashihirajii Yosii, R, 1965:67
- Ptenothrix higumai Yosii, R, 1965:68
- Ptenothrix himalayensis Yosii, 1966
- Ptenothrix huangshanensis Chen, J-X et Christiansen, K, 1996:587
- Ptenothrix iriomotensis Uchida, H, 1965:92
- Ptenothrix janthina Börner, C, 1909:132
- Ptenothrix keralae Prabhoo, 1971
- Ptenothrix koreanensis Jo, S-H et Park, K-H, 2023:126
- Ptenothrix kuraschvilii Djanaschvili, 1970
- Ptenothrix lactea Uchida, 1953
- Ptenothrix leucostrigata Stach, J, 1957:98
- Ptenothrix macomba Wray, 1967
- Ptenothrix maculosa (Schott, 1891)
- Ptenothrix marmorata (Packard, 1873) Mills, HB, 1934
- Ptenothrix mongolica Yosii, 1954
- Ptenothrix monochroma Yosii, R et Lee, C-E, 1963:20
- Ptenothrix narumii Uchida, 1940
- Ptenothrix nigricornis (Ionesco, 1916) Stach, J, 1957:91
- Ptenothrix ocellata (Becker, 1902)
- Ptenothrix palawanensis Yosii, R, 1969:223
- Ptenothrix palmata (Folsom, JW, 1902) Stach, J, 1957
- Ptenothrix palmisetacea Lin & Feng, 1985
- Ptenothrix plumiseta Kang J-S et Lee B-H in Kang, J-S, Lee, B-H et Park, K-H, 2005:235
- Ptenothrix quadrangularis (Mills, HB, 1934:106)
- Ptenothrix renateae Snider, RJ, 1985
- Ptenothrix reticulata Stach, J, 1957:105
- Ptenothrix rubra Bretfeld & Trinklein, 2000
- Ptenothrix ryoheii Uchida, 1953
- Ptenothrix saxatilis Yosii, R et Lee, C-E, 1963:19
- Ptenothrix setosa (Krausbauer, 1898:24) Handschin, B, 1929:125
- Ptenothrix simplificata Stach, 1957
- Ptenothrix sinensis Lin & Feng, 1985
- Ptenothrix tateyamana Uchida, H, 1958:76
- Ptenothrix texensis (Packard, AS, 1873:42) Stach, J, 1957:80
- Ptenothrix tranvansoii Yoshii, 1994
- Ptenothrix tricycla Uchida, 1953
- Ptenothrix tsutsuii Yosii, R, 1955:398
- Ptenothrix unicolor (Harvey, 1893) Folsom, 1928
- Ptenothrix utingae Arlé & Guimaraes, 1976
- Ptenothrix vinnula Uchida, H, 1957:26
- Ptenothrix violacea Handschin, 1929
- Ptenothrix violaceopa Hüther, 1967
- Ptenothrix vittata (Folsom, 1896) Folsom, 1934
- Ptenothrix yakushimana Yosii, R, 1965:65
- Ptenothrix yunnana Itoh, R et Zhao, L-J, 2000:159

== Undescribed species ==

Ptenothrix Species 6 (Christiansen & Bellinger,1980)

There is an undescribed species, being called Ptenothrix Species 6 ranging from Alaska to California. It is mentioned in C&B in the key for the Ptenothrix, and is also mentioned on the Mesofauna of the Pacific Coast website, as well as Collembolla.org. It is identified by its long "fishbone" pattern, a white neck, small round stature, and brown coloration, as well as its smooth overall body. Other differences are microscopic.
