= Calvatomina rufescens =

Scientific classification
- Kingdom: Animalia
- Phylum: Arthropoda
- Clade: Pancrustacea
- Class: Collembola
- Order: Symphypleona
- Family: Dicyrtomidae
- Genus: Calvatomina
- Species: C. rufescens

Binomial name
- Calvatomina rufescens (Reuter, OM, 1892)

Species of springtail

Calvatomina rufescens is a species of springtail in the genus Calvatomina found in North America and Europe. This species is found on and under wood across the eastern United States and Eurasia.

== Description ==
It is red in overall coloration. It looks very similar to Dicyrtoma fusca, differing in its orangey coloration, genital hairs, and heavily reticulated eyes.
