= Dicyrtoma hageni =

- Dicyrtoma hageni found in Athens, GA

Scientific classification
- Kingdom: Animalia
- Phylum: Arthropoda
- Clade: Pancrustacea
- Class: Collembola
- Order: Symphypleona
- Family: Dicyrtomidae
- Genus: Dicyrtoma
- Species: D. hageni

Binomial name
- Dicyrtoma hageni (Folsom, 1896)

Synonyms
- Dicyrtoma frontalis Folsom, 1896; Papirius hageni Banks, 1903

Species of springtail

Dicyrtoma hageni is a species of globular springtails in the genus Dicyrtoma endemic to the East Coast of North America .

== Appearance ==
This species is extremely variable. It always has dark sides with a lighter yellow-white form which has an oval shape, and a darker form with a dorsal stripe. It is smaller and lighter in color than Dicyrtoma fusca.

== Similar species ==
There is a similar yet to be described species found in British Columbia and the Olympic Peninsula being tentatively called by Sage Osterling as Dicyrtoma nr. hageni on his site Mesofauna of the Pacific Coast, which was originally informally described via photos by Frans Jessens as Dicyrtoma hageni f. canadensis and revealed to indeed be undescribed via microscopy by Pete Lypkie. It has a black cross down the middle and a small amount of white on the shoulders. It differs otherwise microscopically and therefore is a species near D. hageni and not a form of the species.
