= Ptenothrix renateae =

- Ptenothrix renateae from Athens GA

Scientific classification
- Kingdom: Animalia
- Phylum: Arthropoda
- Clade: Pancrustacea
- Class: Collembola
- Order: Symphypleona
- Family: Dicyrtomidae
- Genus: Ptenothrix
- Species: P. renateae

Binomial name
- Ptenothrix renateae (Snider, RJ, 1985)

Species of springtail

Ptenothrix renateae is a species of springtail in the genus Ptenothrix endemic to the East Coast of North America.

It is characterized by a brown color, heavy reticulation, and an arrow shape pattern on the back. it has a line on the back of the abdomen, black flanks on the sides of the abdomen, and two white spots on the side. It looks similar to Ptenothrix beta in body shape, differing in antennae bands and pattern.
