= Ptenothrix alveola =

Scientific classification
- Kingdom: Animalia
- Phylum: Arthropoda
- Clade: Pancrustacea
- Class: Collembola
- Order: Symphypleona
- Family: Dicyrtomidae
- Genus: Ptenothrix
- Species: P. alveola

Binomial name
- Ptenothrix alveola (Lucas, 1846)

Species of springtail

Ptenothrix alveola is a species of springtail endemic to Eurasia in the genus Ptenothrix.

== Description ==
This species is characterized by its checkered pattern, branded antenna, yellow eyes, fishbone pattern near the back of the abdomen, and unusually long antenna. It also has a series of hairs down the middle of the face.
