= Frans Janssens (taxonomist) =

Belgian entomologist

Frans Janssens (1952–2024) was a Belgian taxonomist and the founder of the website Collembola.org.

He worked for the University of Antwerp as a laboratory associate. He wrote multiple springtail related academic papers during his time there. He made resources on the internet to identify springtails visually, notably Collembola.org, which was a list of every springtail ever described or otherwise based off of C&B and other springtail Taxonomic papers. he also made many contributions on Bugguide.

Frans made many tentative IDs that helped raise attention to many species. While some were proven to be incorrect, his contribution was very important to springtail taxonomy as a whole. Much of the genus Ptenothrix would have still likely be cryptic without Frans's pointers.
