= Dicyrtoma flammea =

Scientific classification
- Domain: Eukaryota
- Kingdom: Animalia
- Phylum: Arthropoda
- Class: Collembola
- Order: Symphypleona
- Family: Dicyrtomidae
- Genus: Dicyrtoma
- Species: D. flammea

Binomial name
- Dicyrtoma flammea Maynard, 1951

Species of springtail

Dicyrtoma flammea is a species of globular springtails in the family Dicyrtomidae.
