= Ptenothrix plumiseta =

Scientific classification
- Kingdom: Animalia
- Phylum: Arthropoda
- Clade: Pancrustacea
- Class: Collembola
- Order: Symphypleona
- Family: Dicyrtomidae
- Genus: Ptenothrix
- Species: P. plumiseta

Binomial name
- Ptenothrix plumiseta Kang J-S & Lee B-H, 2005

Species of springtail

Ptenothrix plumiseta is a species of globular springtail in the family Dicyrtomidae, and was first described in 2005 by Kang Jin-sun, Lee Byung-hoon and Park Kyung-Hwa.

It is endemic to the Korean peninsula, where it has been found in the province of Jeollabuk-do, in pine-forest leaf litter.
