= Dicyrtomina turbotti =

Scientific classification
- Domain: Eukaryota
- Kingdom: Animalia
- Phylum: Arthropoda
- Class: Collembola
- Order: Symphypleona
- Family: Dicyrtomidae
- Genus: Dicyrtomina
- Species: D. turbotti

Binomial name
- Dicyrtomina turbotti Salmon, 1948

Species of springtail

Dicyrtomina turbotti is a species of springtail belonging to the family Dicyrtomidae. The species was first described by John Salmon in 1948, and is endemic to Manawatāwhi / Three Kings Islands in New Zealand.

== Taxonomy ==
The species was identified by Salmon in 1948, based on a specimen collected from leaf mould in the Manawatāwhi / Three Kings Islands by Evan Graham Turbott in 1946. Salmon named the species after Turbott.

== Description ==
Salmon's original text (the type description) reads as follows:

Colour: Pale-yellow with purplish antennae, darkest towards tips; ocellar fields dark purple to black.

Clothing: Occasional simple setae with spines on top of head and around posterior of abdomen; dens with four pairs of ventral setae, numerous basal spine-like setae and an apical girdle of short, stout spines; legs sparsely clothed with short simple setae; four moderately long lasiotrichia to each side of abdomen, the upper bothriotrich on each side carries two lasiotrichia. Body: Length, up to 0.8 mm (0.031 in). Antennae one-third as long again as head, the four segments related as 35 :100:145 :62; segments II and III (particularly the latter) with swellings and protuberances and sparsely clothed with stout simple setae; Ant. II with either a single or a pair of short exposed sense rods at one-third from base, a larger central sense rod with, usually, a pair of shorter ones and either a single or a pair of moderately long, straight, sub-apical sense rods; Ant. IIT sub-apically with a pair of long, curved, exposed sense rods and having each protuberance bearing a small sense rod; Ant. IV clothed with numerous long curved setae and supplied with a small apical finger and 9-10 short straight sense rods. Ocelli eight to each side, the central one very small. Legs: Claw finely granulate without tunica and without inner tooth but with a pair of strong outer teeth at four-fifths down; unguiculus two-thirds to three-quarters as long as claw, with narrow outer lamella and broad angular inner lamella bearing a prominent spine at angle, the apical bristle filamentous on fore and middle feet much over-reaching tip of claw, short and bristle-like on hind feet but still over-reaching claw tip; a short basal seta to each side of claw.

Furcula: Manubrium: dens: mucro as 20 45:13: Mucro broadly spathulate, distinctly granulate and coarsely serrated along both edges and round apex.

== Distribution and habitat ==
The species is endemic to New Zealand, found in the Manawatāwhi / Three Kings Islands.
