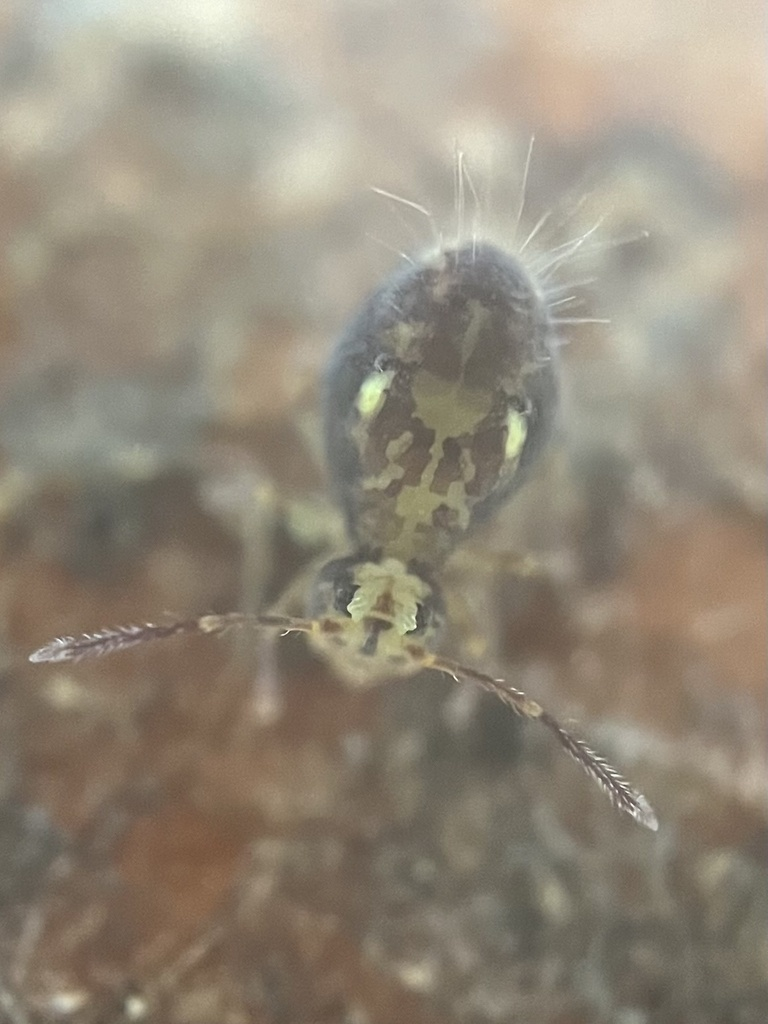

Scientific classification
- Kingdom: Animalia
- Phylum: Arthropoda
- Class: Collembola
- Order: Symphypleona
- Family: Dicyrtomidae
- Genus: Dicyrtomina
- Species: D. saundersi

Binomial name
- Dicyrtomina saundersi (J.Lubbock, 1862)

= Dicyrtomina saundersi =

Species of springtail

Dicyrtomina saundersi is a species of springtail in the genus Dicyrtomina. It was first described by John Lubbock in 1862.

== Appearance ==
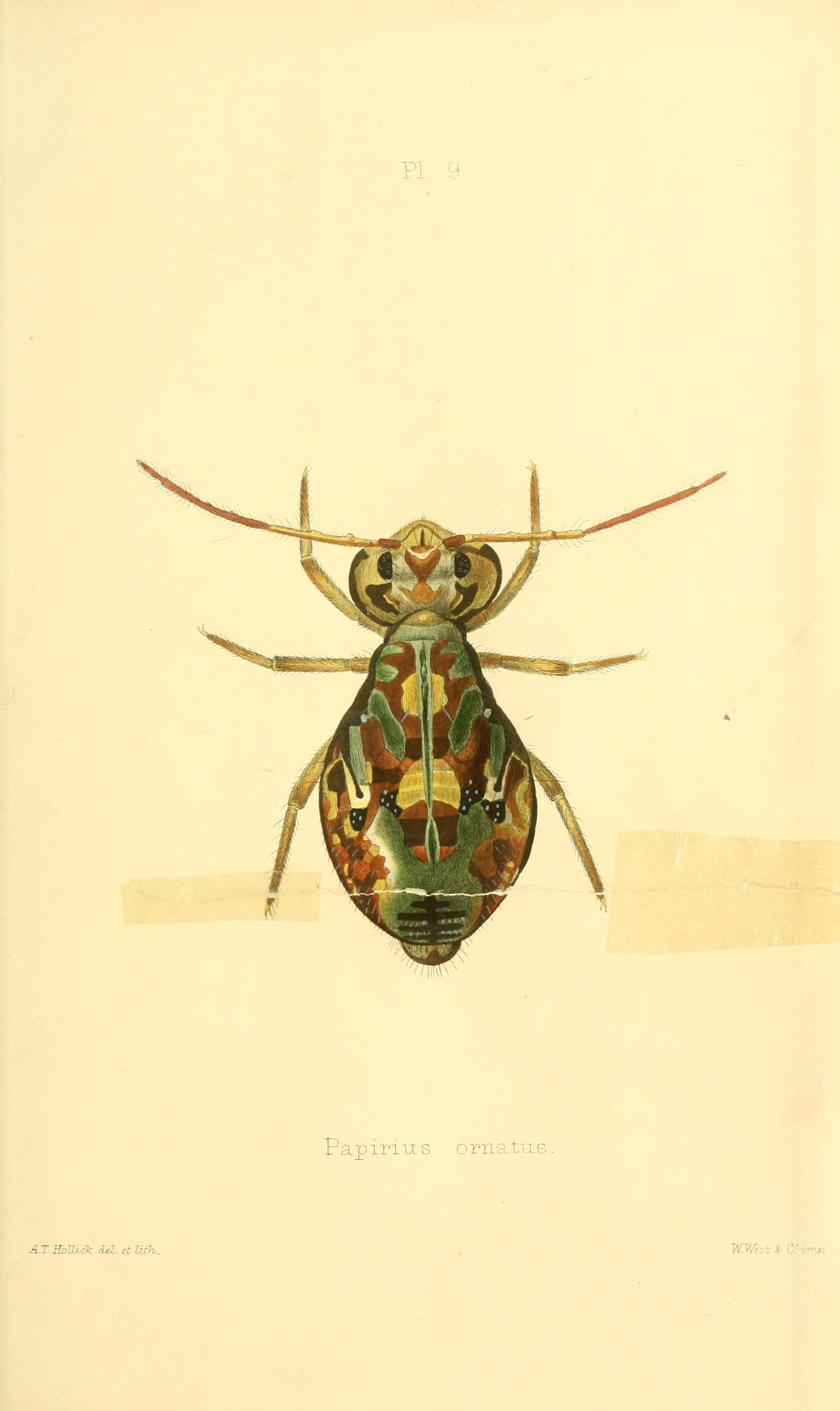
Illustration of D. saundersi.

The species appears as a plump springtail with a reddish "pine tree" pattern. The species also has two yellow dots on the top of it. The sides of the adults are dark brown.
