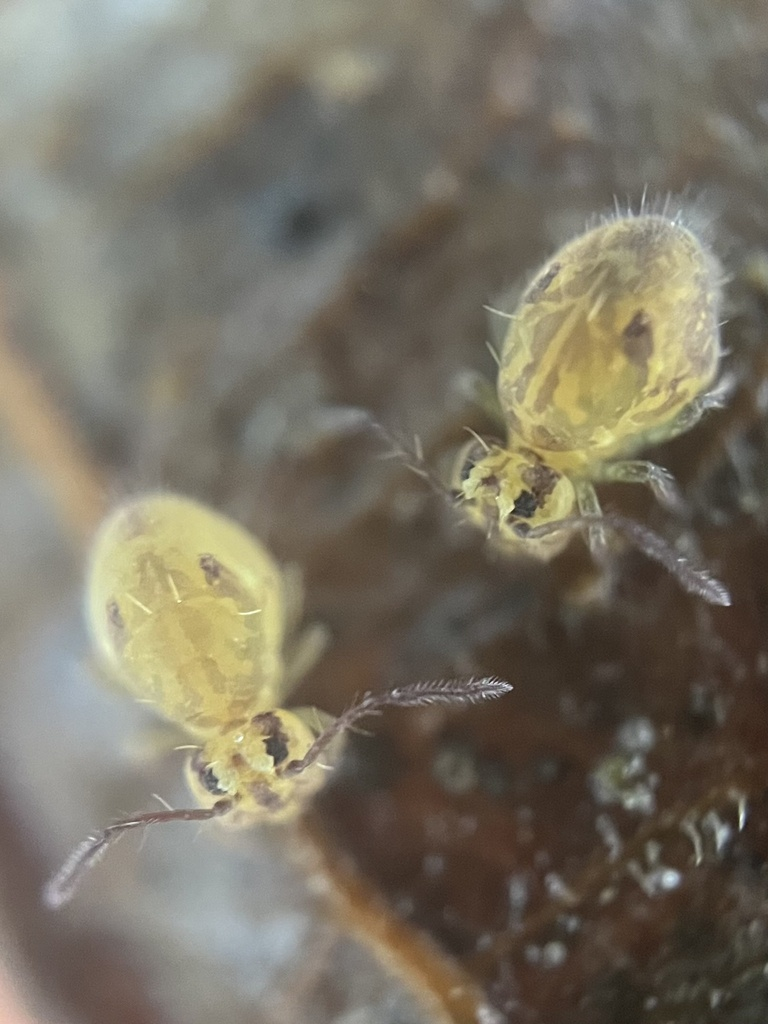
- Ptenothrix maculosa found in Rochester, Washington

Scientific classification
- Kingdom: Animalia
- Phylum: Arthropoda
- Clade: Pancrustacea
- Class: Collembola
- Order: Symphypleona
- Family: Dicyrtomidae
- Genus: Ptenothrix
- Species: P. maculosa

Binomial name
- Ptenothrix maculosa (Schott, 1891)

= Ptenothrix maculosa =

Species of springtail

Ptenothrix maculosa is a species of globular springtail in the genus Ptenothrix found on the temperate west coast of North America.

== History and visual appearance ==
This species is extremely variable and has many color forms. Due to lack of microscopy, at least four other species of springtails have been mislabeled under its name. Some of the west coast springtails that were misidentified as Ptenothrix maculosa were Ptenothrix delongi, Ptenothrix beta, and Ptenothrix californica.

Microscopic keying by citizen scientists across the west helped to find out the real maculosa, which had been labeled under "Undescribed Ptenothrix" by Belgian taxonomist Frans Janssens.

Another misconception within the community was that the summer colour-pattern of Ptenothrix maculosa, which were misidentified as Ptenothrix palmata (a separate west coast species of springtail noted as being similar, and associated with alpine and arctic habitats). This was also proven false after multiple specimens keyed out to Ptenothrix maculosa.

There was another misidentification done via pattern for this species as Ptenothrix marmorata (an east coast species of Ptenothrix) in 2021, which is thankfully the only of its kind.

Another form of Ptenothrix maculosa that remained unidentified for some time was one listed on collembola.org as "Ptenothrix Species 4". Frans Janssens had conjectured that due to the different colour pattern, this may be a new species. Eventual microscopic identification showed that it was a color-pattern variant of P. maculosa. Several other conjectured undescribed species ("species 3", and "species 5") were also similarly synonymized by microscopic investigation.

A form of this species under the "Species 3" label is a bicolor of Ptenothrix maculosa, which caused confusion when attempting to visually identify Ptenothrix maculosa before Ptenothrix maculosa's bicolor form was put under a microscope and yet again keyed out to Ptenothrix maculosa.

== Appearance and identification ==
The species is described in terms of microscopic features that are unique, such as the arrangement and size of setae on the small abdomen at the posterior of the body, as well as relative lengths of certain setae on the tip of the furca (the jumping organ).

Over time several visual patterns have been noted that will distinguish this species in photos, compared to other species found in the same locations. This photo identification has been critical for citizen science sites such as iNaturalist, to gain insight into the geographical range of the species.

== Habitat ==
This species is a common woodland species, ranging from Alaska to California.

It is commonly found under rotting wood, and in and under leaf litter, where it plays the roll of a decomposer in natural areas.

Ptenothrix maculosa is classified as native to, and likely endemic to North America.

== Original description ==
This species was described by Henrik Schött, a Swedish entomologist in 1891.

It was later commented on in Christiansen & Bellinger 1981, as being a west coast species of a neararctic distribution.

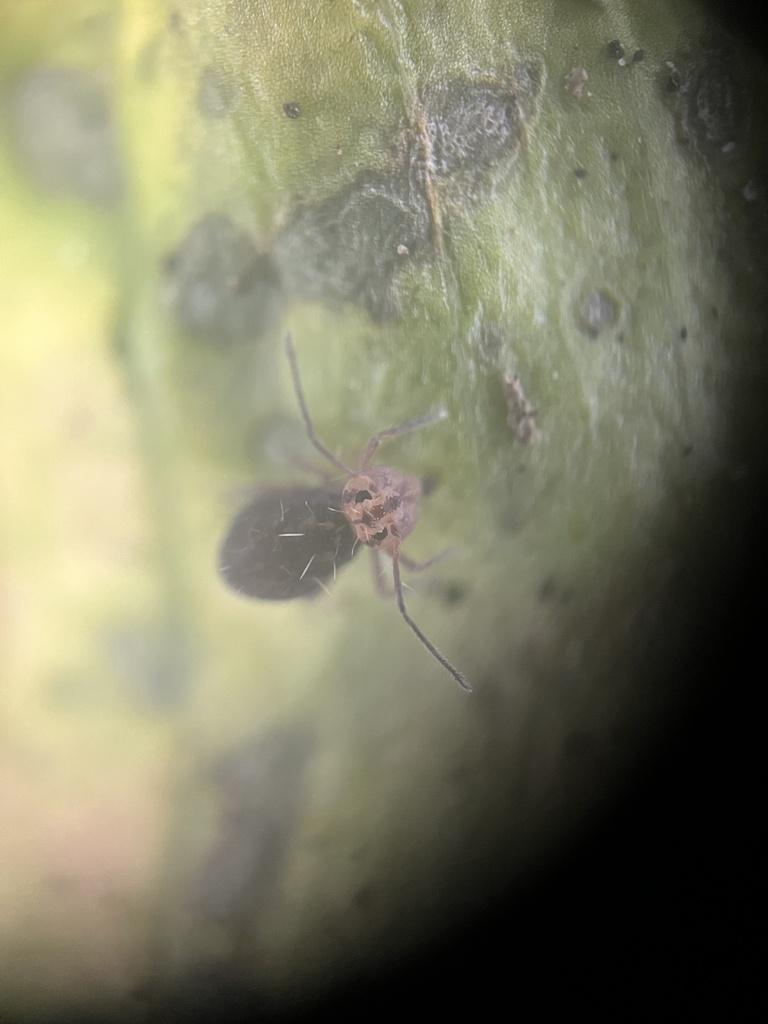
A Ptenothrix maculosa "grape" found in Moclips, Washington

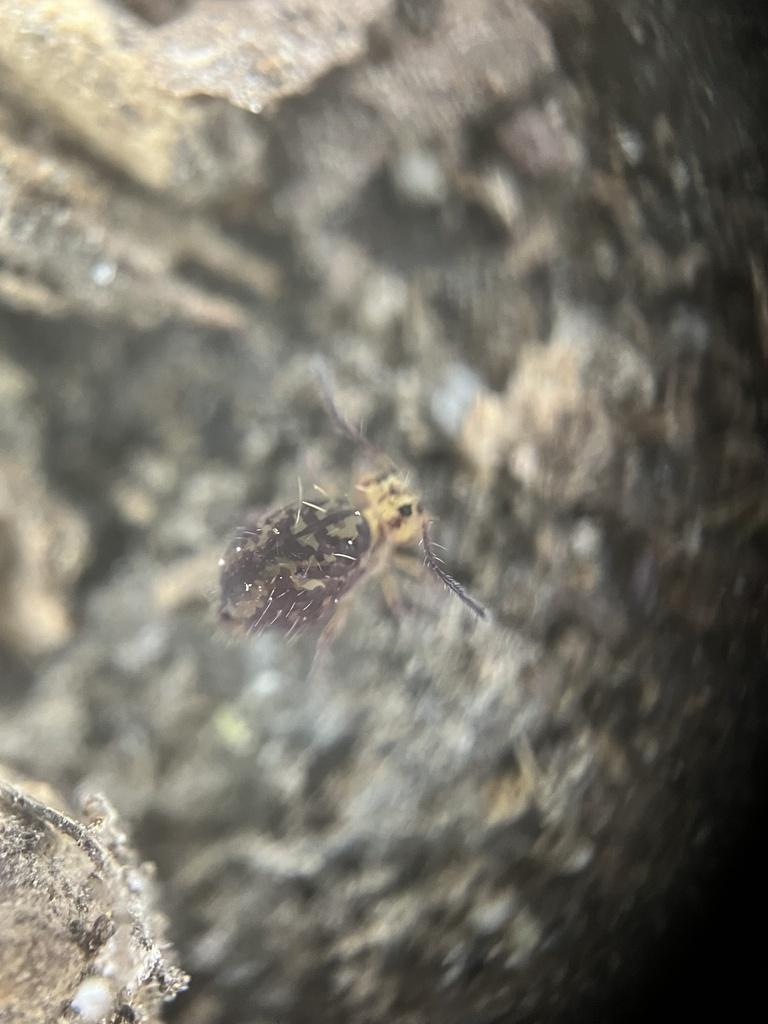
An "Eiffel Tower" patterned Ptenothrix maculosa found at Bridle Trails State Park in Washington State

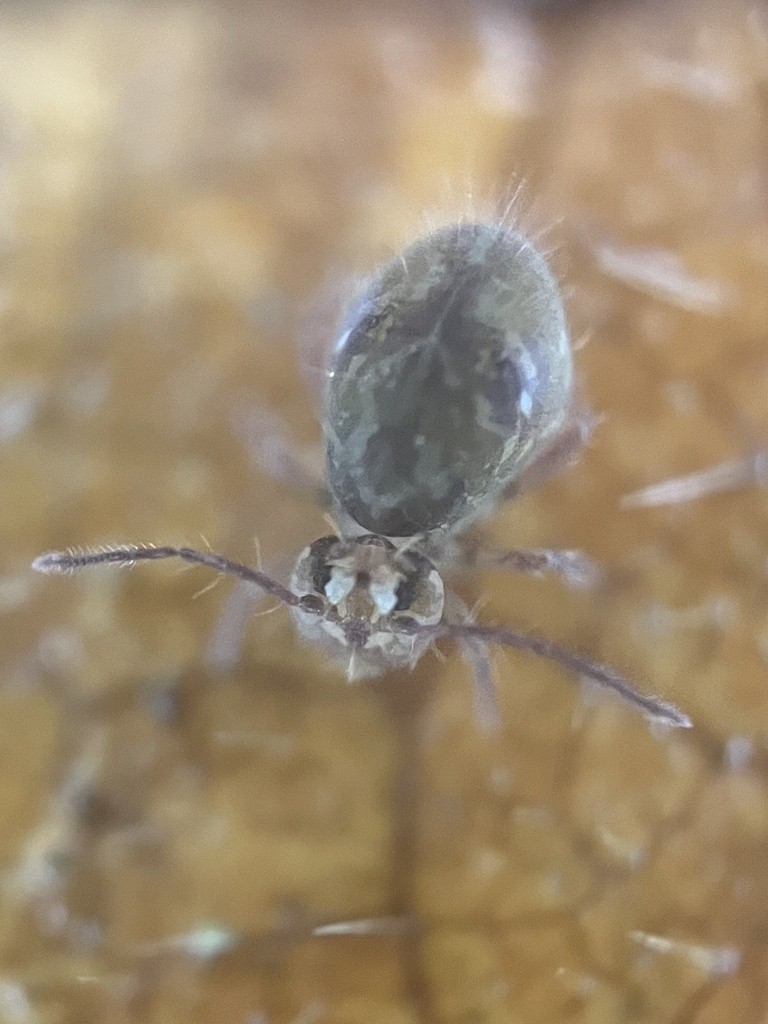
Ptenothrix maculosa found at Lincoln Park, Washington

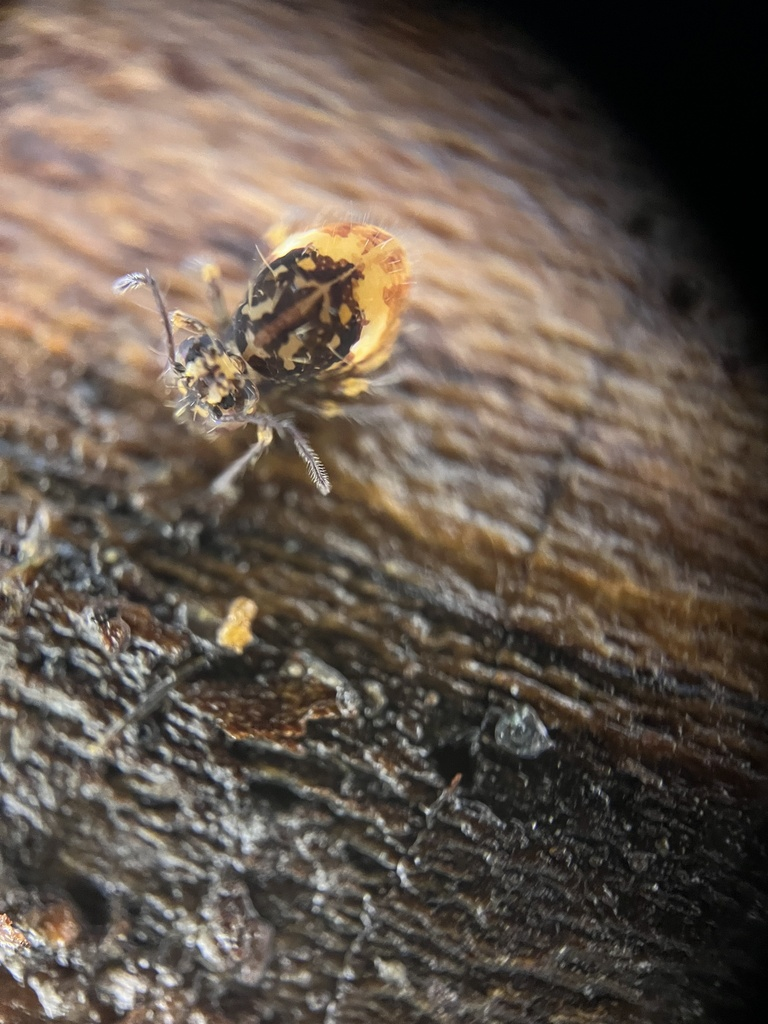
A Ptenothrix maculosa bicolor form, found on the Coal Creek Trail in Washington State.

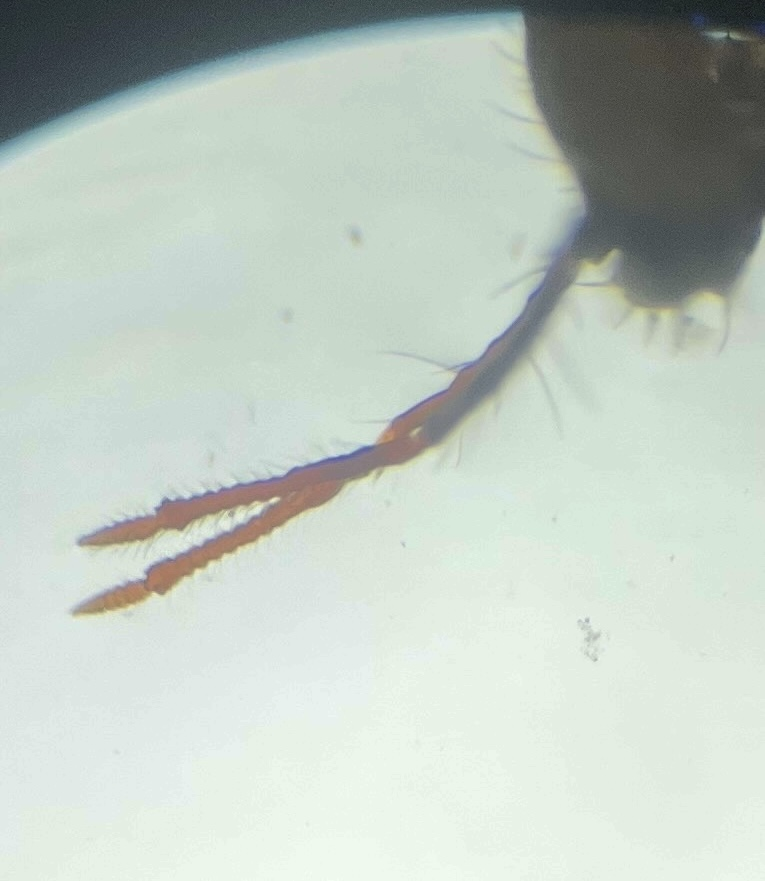
Ptenothrix maculosa antennae under a microscope

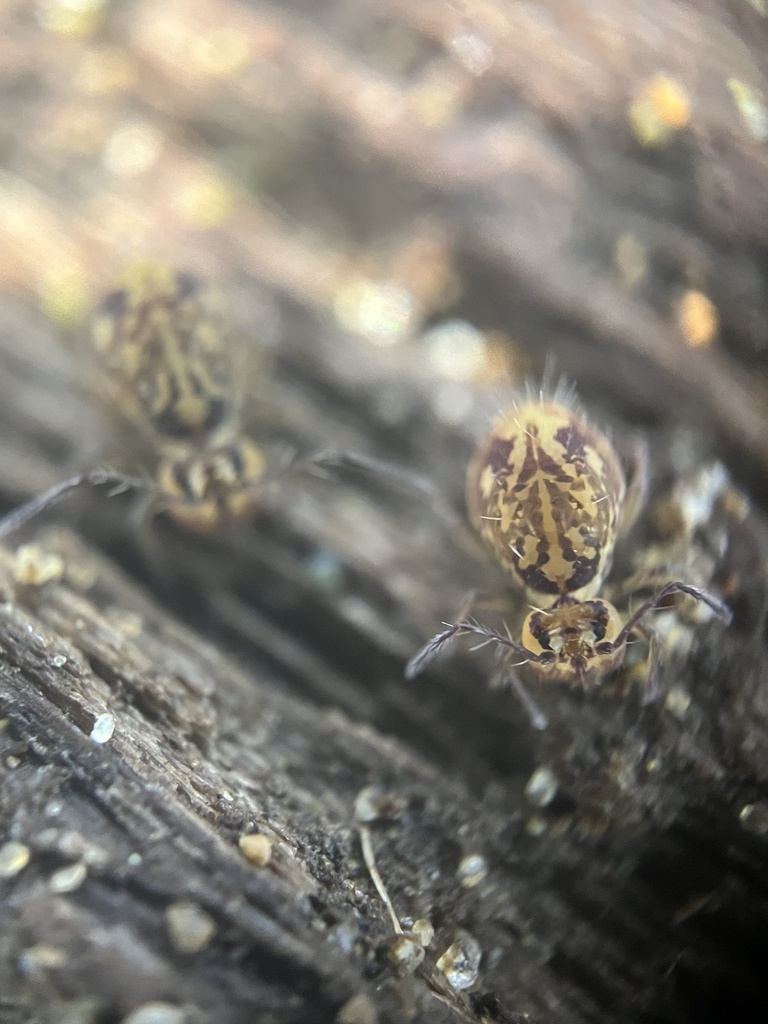
Ptenothrix maculosa in its classic Species 3 form taken at Frink Park, Washington State

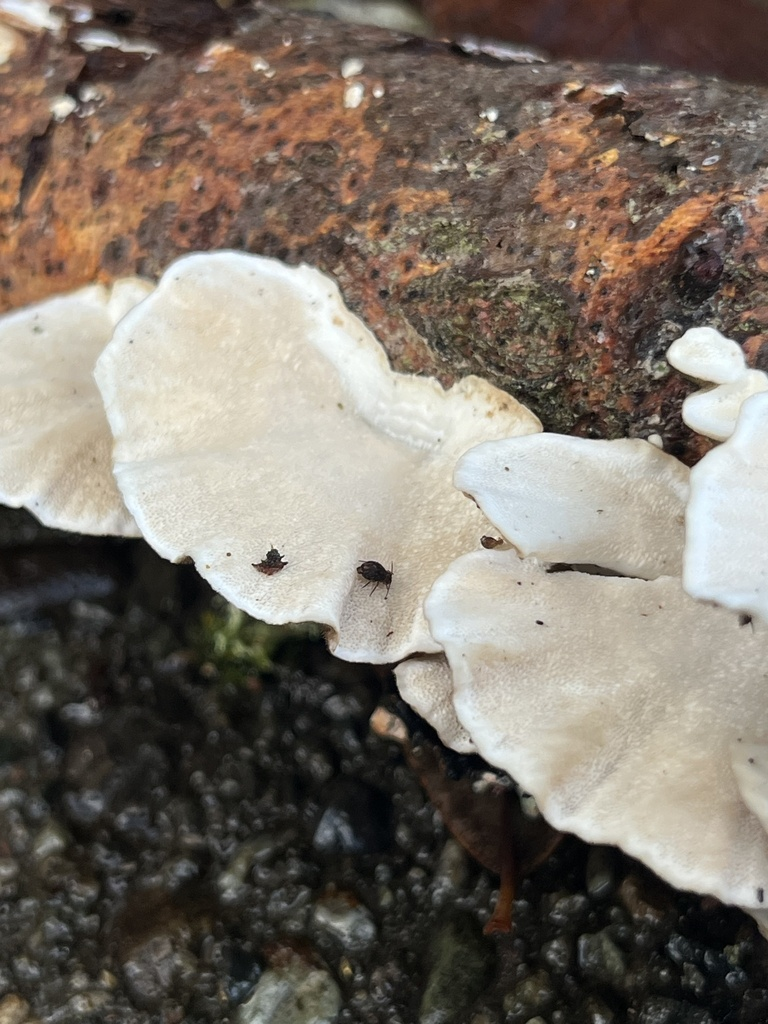
Ptenothrix maculosa on a turkey tail for scale, found off the road, Rainer Ave, in King County, WA
