= Dicyrtoma aurata =

Scientific classification
- Domain: Eukaryota
- Kingdom: Animalia
- Phylum: Arthropoda
- Class: Collembola
- Order: Symphypleona
- Family: Dicyrtomidae
- Genus: Dicyrtoma
- Species: D. aurata

Binomial name
- Dicyrtoma aurata (Mills, 1934)

Synonyms
- Ptenothrix aurata Mills, 1934

Species of springtail

Dicyrtoma aurata is a species of globular springtails in the family Dicyrtomidae.
