= Ptenothrix marmorata =

Scientific classification
- Kingdom: Animalia
- Phylum: Arthropoda
- Clade: Pancrustacea
- Class: Collembola
- Order: Symphypleona
- Family: Dicyrtomidae
- Genus: Ptenothrix
- Species: P. marmorata

Binomial name
- Ptenothrix marmorata (Packard,1873)

Species of springtail

Ptenothrix marmorata, the marbled springtail, is a species of springtail in the genus Ptenothrix. It is found in the East Coast and Midwestern parts of the North America.

== Description ==
This species has a reticulated pattern down its sides, and a segmented Christmas tree pattern. It also has bristly antenna with a horn-like protrusion on the end. It is brown in coloration. This species is less hairy than other species of Ptenothrix, and has a rounded and humped body. Pattern is not a consistent identifier since some individuals have a triangular pattern down the back.

== Habitat ==
This species has been found living on mushrooms and living under logs across the East coast. It is an important decomposer, breaking down leaflitter, wood, and rotten mushrooms.

== History ==
This species has been confused with Ptenothrix maculosa in a few instances. Dan Nelson's blog post being a P. maculosa individual labeled as a P. marmota being the first one.

There have also been theories of hybridization between the two species where the ranges supposedly interlap. This has not been confirmed and microscopically all specimens that these have been theorized about have keyed out to P. marmota. Frans Jessans called this form P. marmorata forma testudineata.

Frans's website has a picture of P. maculosa labed as P. marmota taken from a record "taken" in Japan, a area that neither P. maculosa nor P. marmota live in, further adding to the confusion early in keying out this species.

== Similar species ==
There are multiple species out west that are similar to this species including a potentially undescribed species in California and the also Undescribed Ptenothrix Species 6. These are differentiated via antennal, range, and pattern variations.
