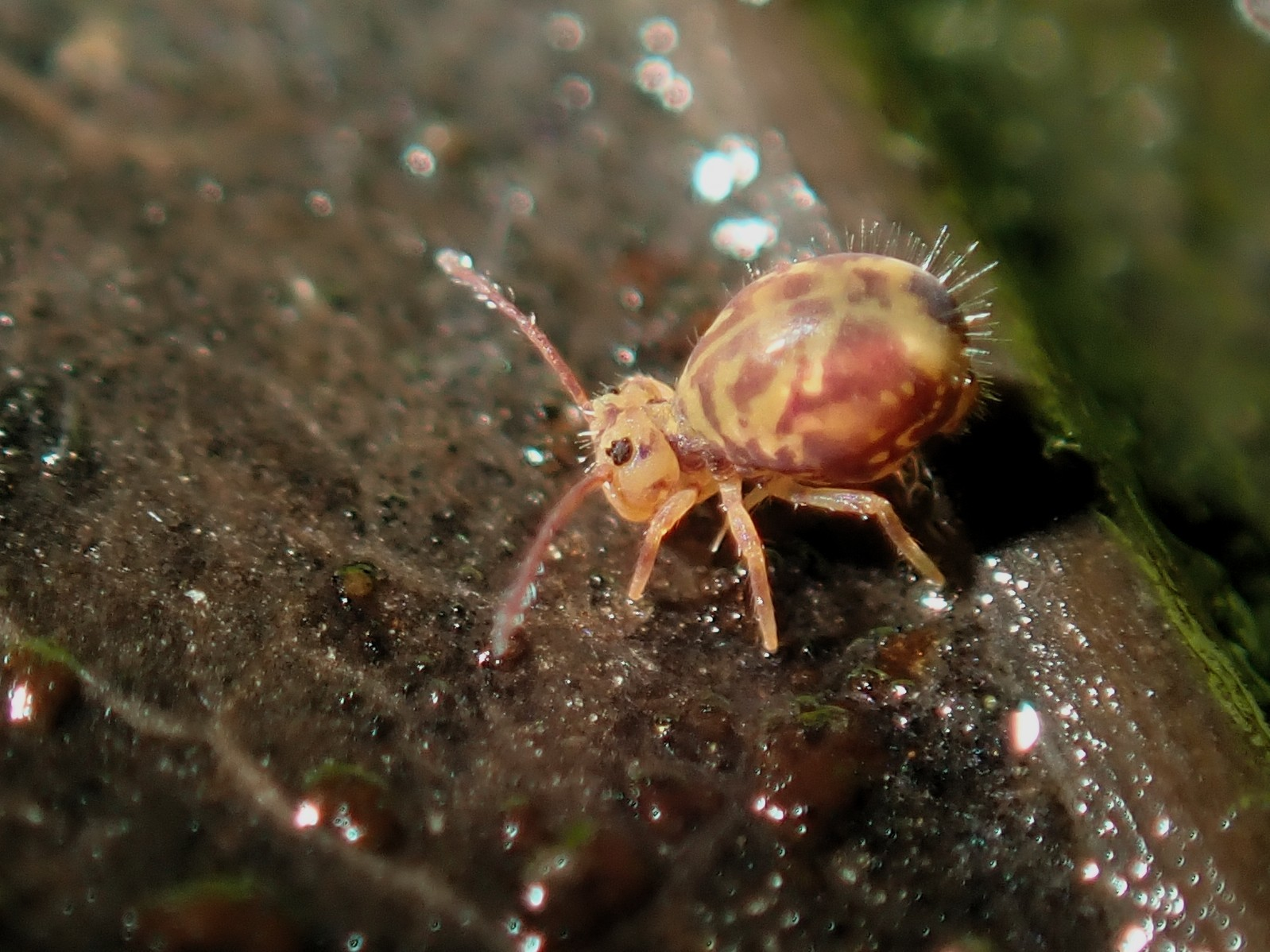

Scientific classification
- Kingdom: Animalia
- Phylum: Arthropoda
- Class: Collembola
- Order: Symphypleona
- Family: Dicyrtomidae
- Genus: Dicyrtomina
- Species: D. ornata

Binomial name
- Dicyrtomina ornata (H.Nicolet, 1842)

= Dicyrtomina ornata =

Species of arthropods

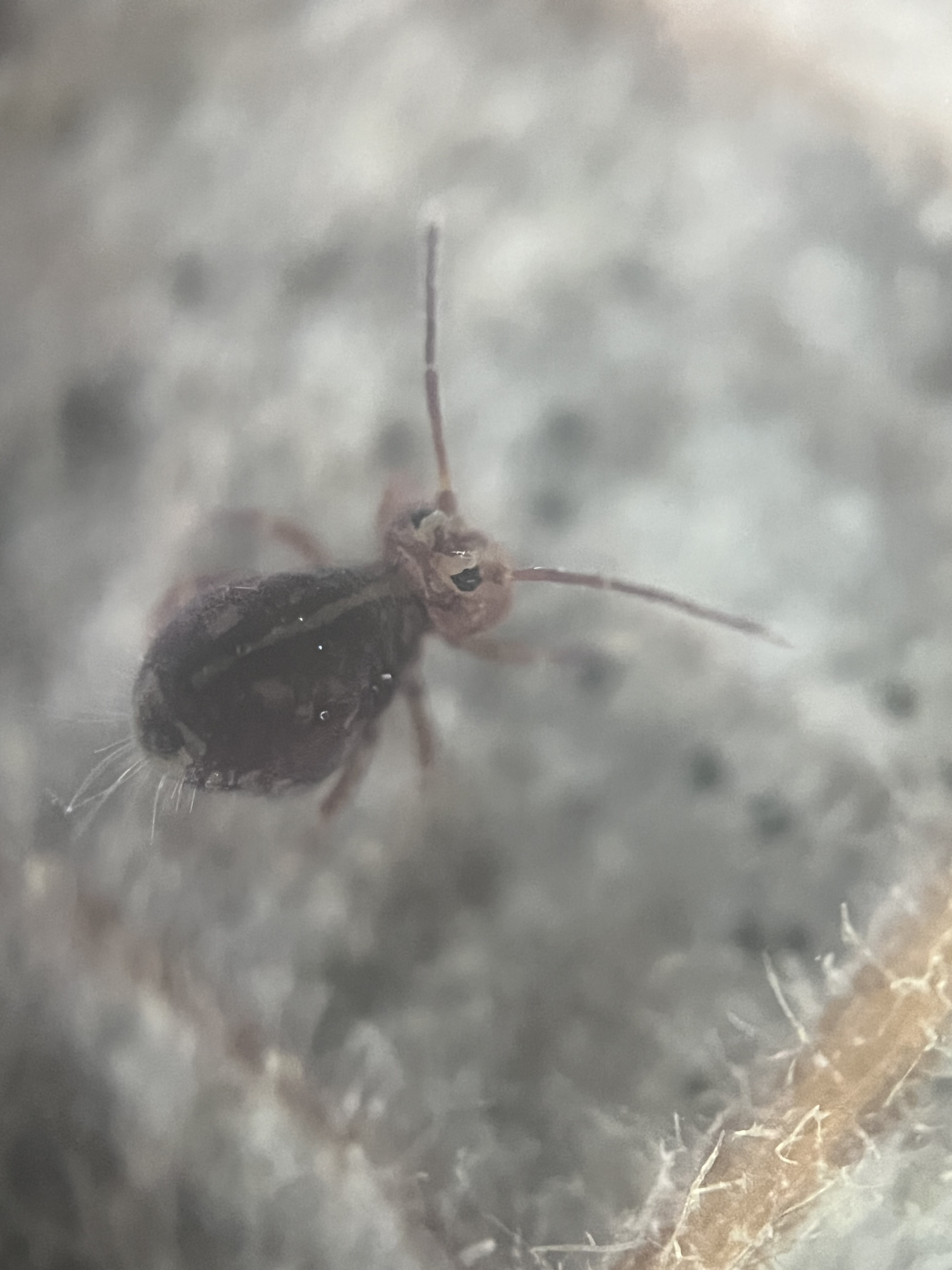
A dark patterned individual of Dicyrtomina ornata

Dicyrtomina ornata is a species of springtail in the genus Dicyrtomina native to the US and Europe.

== Appearance ==
The abdomen has a large arrow shape and overall the coloration of this species is orangeish brown. The sides have brownish highlights and the back has two brown patches.

This genus has short spines that extrude long wax strands at the rear of the abdomen.

== Dicyrtomina ornata couloni ==
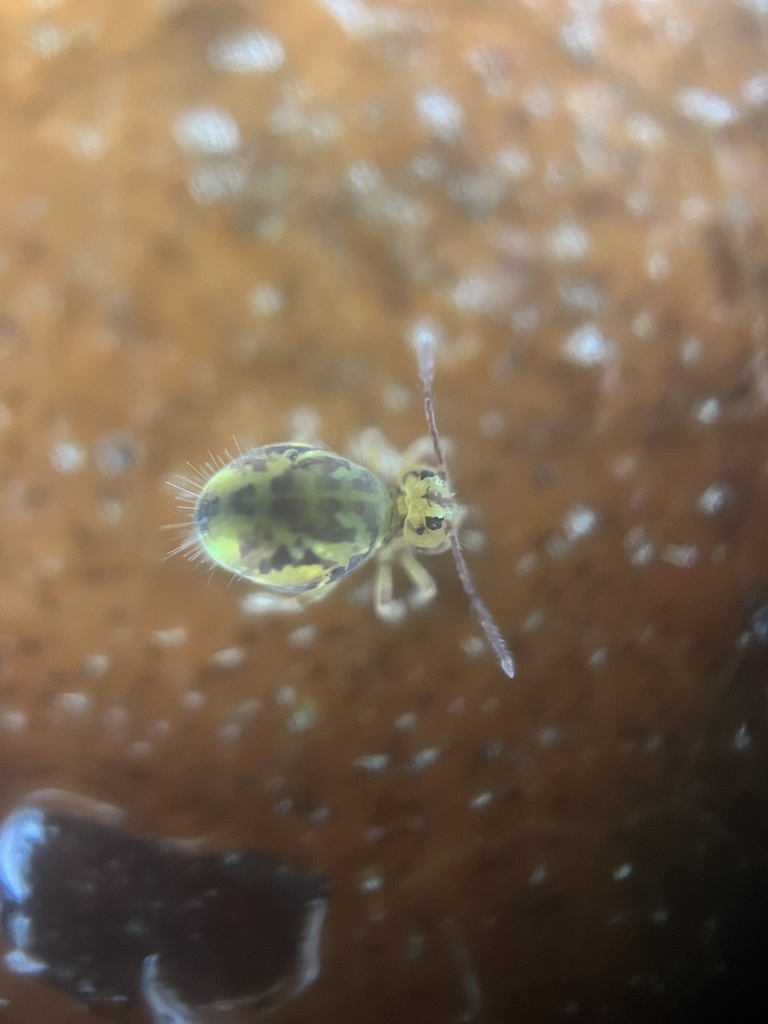
Dicyrtomina ornata couloni on a leaf

Dicyrtomina ornata f. couloni is a form of Dicyrtomina ornata formerly classified as a separate species.

The appearance of this form of Dicytromina ornata is the normal overall body shape, with a more prominent patch on the back of the springtail, and 1-2 broken up lines towards the end.
