= Ptenothrix curvilineata =

Scientific classification
- Kingdom: Animalia
- Phylum: Arthropoda
- Clade: Pancrustacea
- Class: Collembola
- Order: Symphypleona
- Family: Dicyrtomidae
- Genus: Ptenothrix
- Species: P. curvilineata

Binomial name
- Ptenothrix curvilineata (Wray, 1949)

Species of springtail

Ptenothrix curvilineata found in GA

Ptenothrix curvilineata is a species of springtail in the genus Ptenothrix endemic to the East Coast of North America.

== Description ==
This species is light overall in coloration being cream to yellowish, with two stripes down the sides towards the middle, dark bands on the sides, and stripes above the eyes. at least one variant has light patches on the sides. It also has medium long antenna. other features are microscopic.
