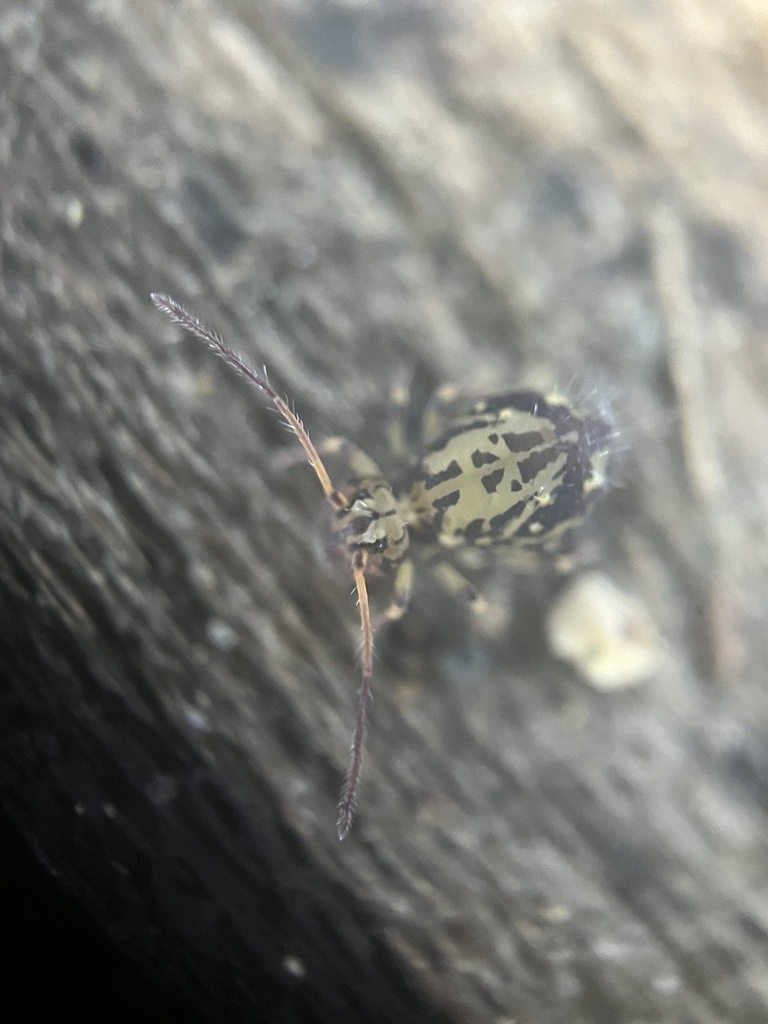

Scientific classification
- Kingdom: Animalia
- Phylum: Arthropoda
- Clade: Pancrustacea
- Class: Collembola
- Order: Symphypleona
- Family: Dicyrtomidae
- Genus: Ptenothrix
- Species: P. delongi

Binomial name
- Ptenothrix delongi (Christiansen & Bellinger, 1981)

= Ptenothrix delongi =

Species of springtail

Ptenothrix delongi is a species of globular springtail in the genus Ptenothrix found in North America and Mexico

== Appearance ==
In winter coloring, P. delongi has distinct brown polygonal patterns on a yellow background color, while in summer it tends to be much lighter, sometimes completely yellow. It is also quite large at around 2 mm (0.079 in). The sides were mistaken for Ptenothrix maculosa, which it was misidentified as until late 2024, when a group of citizen scientists used microscopy to confirm the species' existence and its differences to the other.

Some of the yellows are almost completely patternless, or just have a line down the middle.

== Diet ==
This species eats dead and decaying wood, and can also be found on Fern fronds eating various yeasts.

== Similar species ==
The main reason this species was misidentified as both Ptenothrix maculosa and Ptenothrix beta in the past was that it has only a side pattern to the photo on collembola.org, with no dorsal view, and no antenna. The result was that Ptenothrix delongi was commonly identified wrongly as Ptenothrix maculosa for over five years, before microscopy was performed on these springtails in 2024, that keyed out to Ptenothrix delongi.

one form of this species was mistakenly considered to be Ptenothrix maculosa olympiana along with a separate completely yet to described species.

== Original description ==
this species was described by Christiansen and Bellinger in 1981 as Dicyrtoma delongi. Some outdated sources still use this old name which adds to confusion when looking for resources around this species.

The first ever specimen of this species was discovered in Los Angeles, California. the second was found in Mexico.

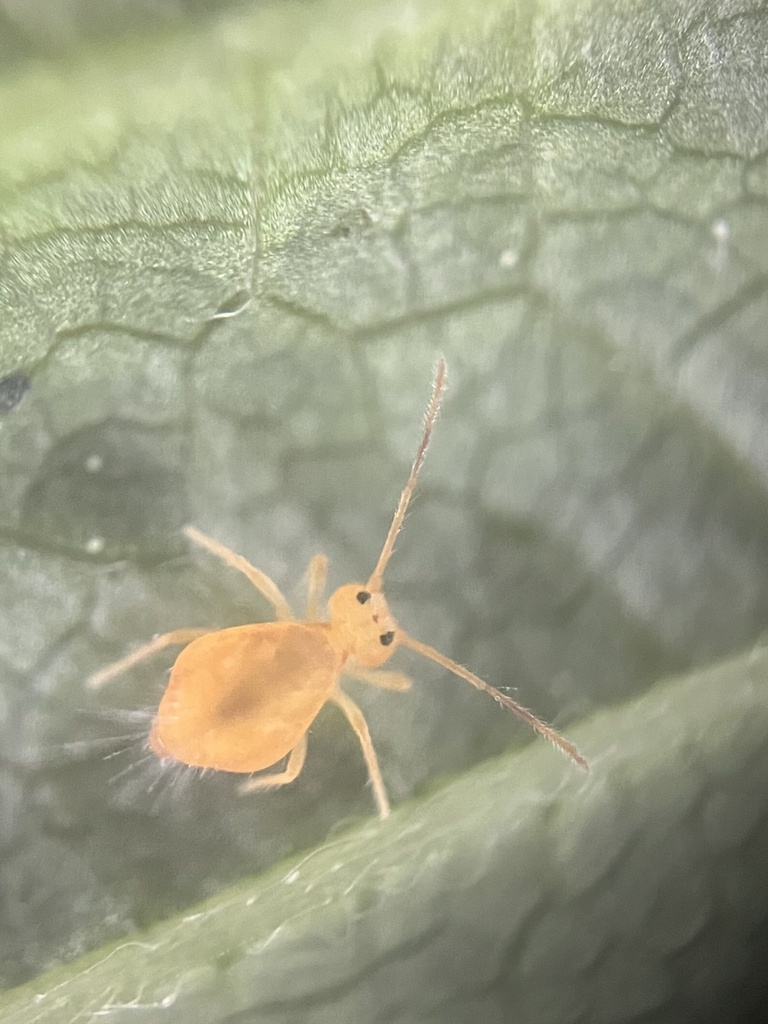
A yellow Ptenothrix delongi found on a leaf in Moclips, Washington

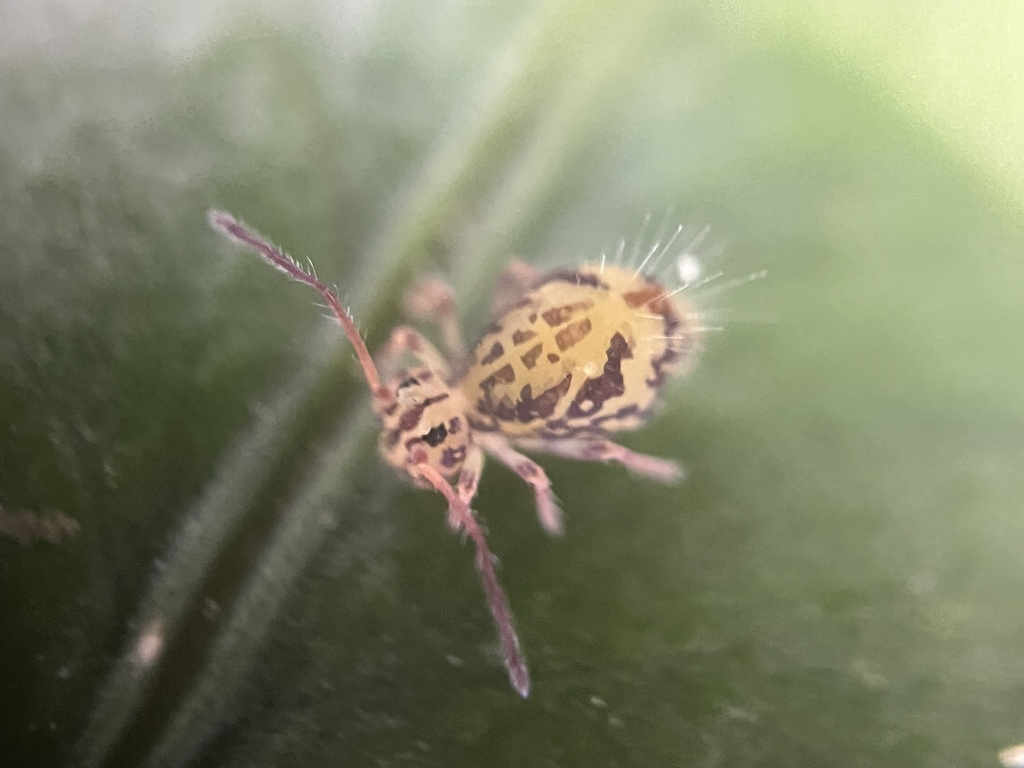
A side view ofPtenothrix delongi taken in Lincoln Park, a city park in Seattle,Washington

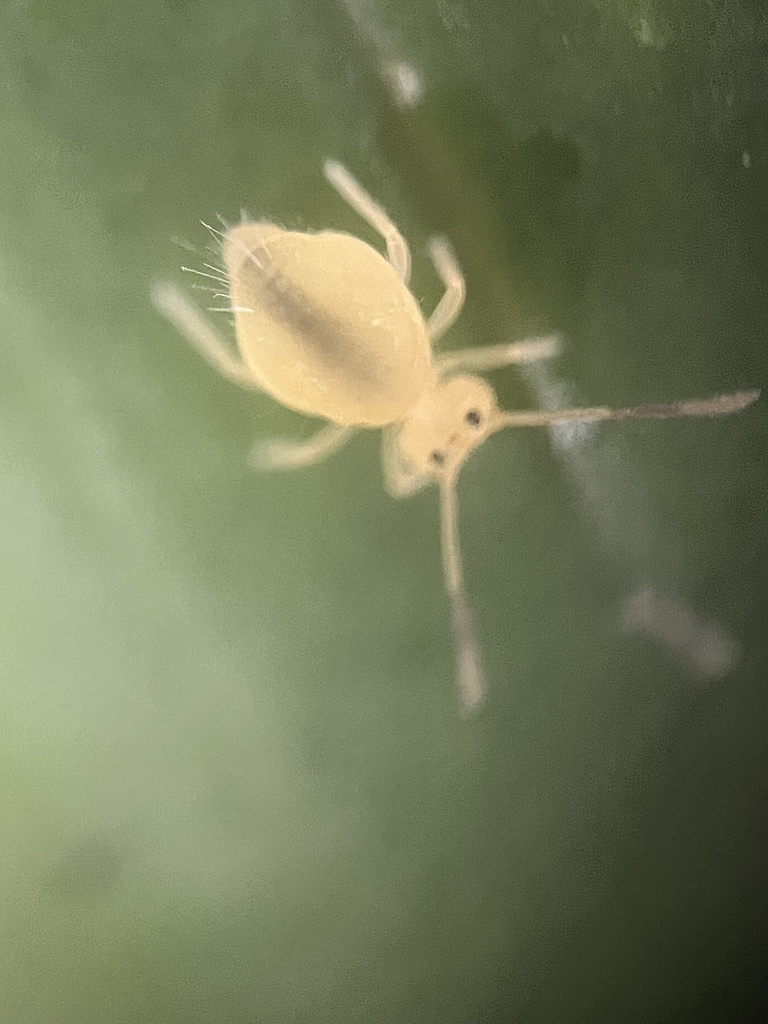
A patternless yellow Ptenothrix delongi found in Moclips, Washington
