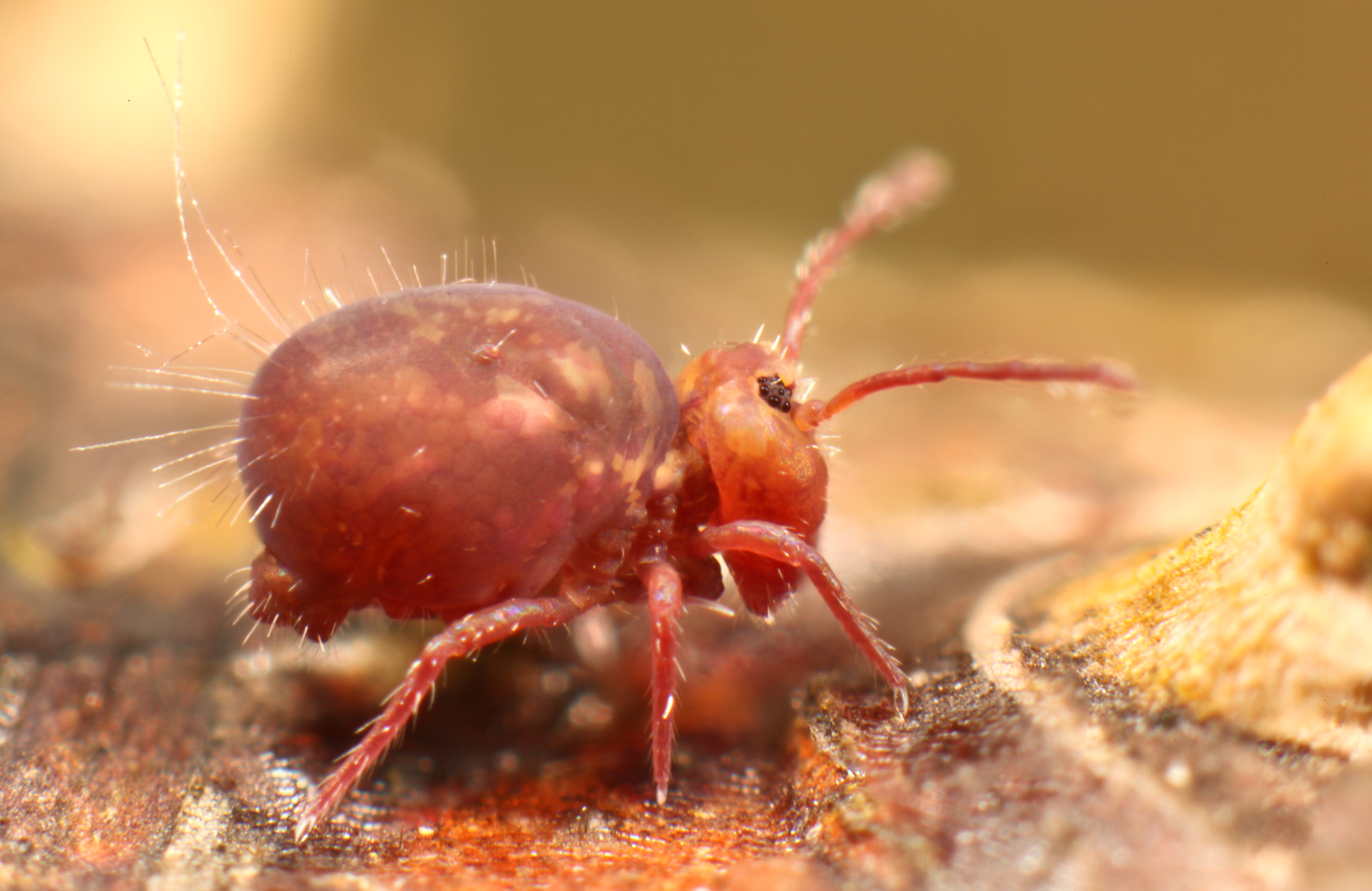
- Dicyrtoma fusca

Scientific classification
- Kingdom: Animalia
- Phylum: Arthropoda
- Clade: Pancrustacea
- Class: Collembola
- Order: Symphypleona
- Family: Dicyrtomidae
- Subfamily: Dicyrtominae
- Genus: Dicyrtoma; Bourlet, 1841

= Dicyrtoma =

Genus of springtails

Dicyrtoma is a genus of globular springtails in the family Dicyrtomidae. They are found in both temperate and Arctic regions worldwide, preferring the temperate forest and rainforest biomes. Some species are encountered cosmopolitanly in places they have been introduced.

== Species ==
- Dicyrtoma aurata (Mills, 1934)
- Dicyrtoma bellingeri Snider, 1990
- Dicyrtoma brevifibra Snider, 1990
- Dicyrtoma flammea Maynard, 1951
- Dicyrtoma fusca (Lubbock, 1873)
- Dicyrtoma fuscus (Lubbock, 1873)
- Dicyrtoma hageni (Folsom, 1896)
- Dicyrtoma kauaiensis (Snider, 1990)
- Dicyrtoma longidigita Snider, 1990
- Dicyrtoma madestris Snider, 1990
- Dicyrtoma microdentata Snider, 1990
- Dicyrtoma mithra Wray, 1949
- Dicyrtoma opalina (Folsom, 1896)
- Dicyrtoma pineolae (Wray, 1946)
- Dicyrtoma quadrangularis Mills, 1934
- Dicyrtoma rossi (Wray, 1952)
- Dicyrtoma serrata (Snider, 1990)
- Dicyrtoma sylvestratilis Snider, 1990
- Dicyrtoma tesselata Snider, 1990
- Dicyrtoma texensis (Packard, 1873)
