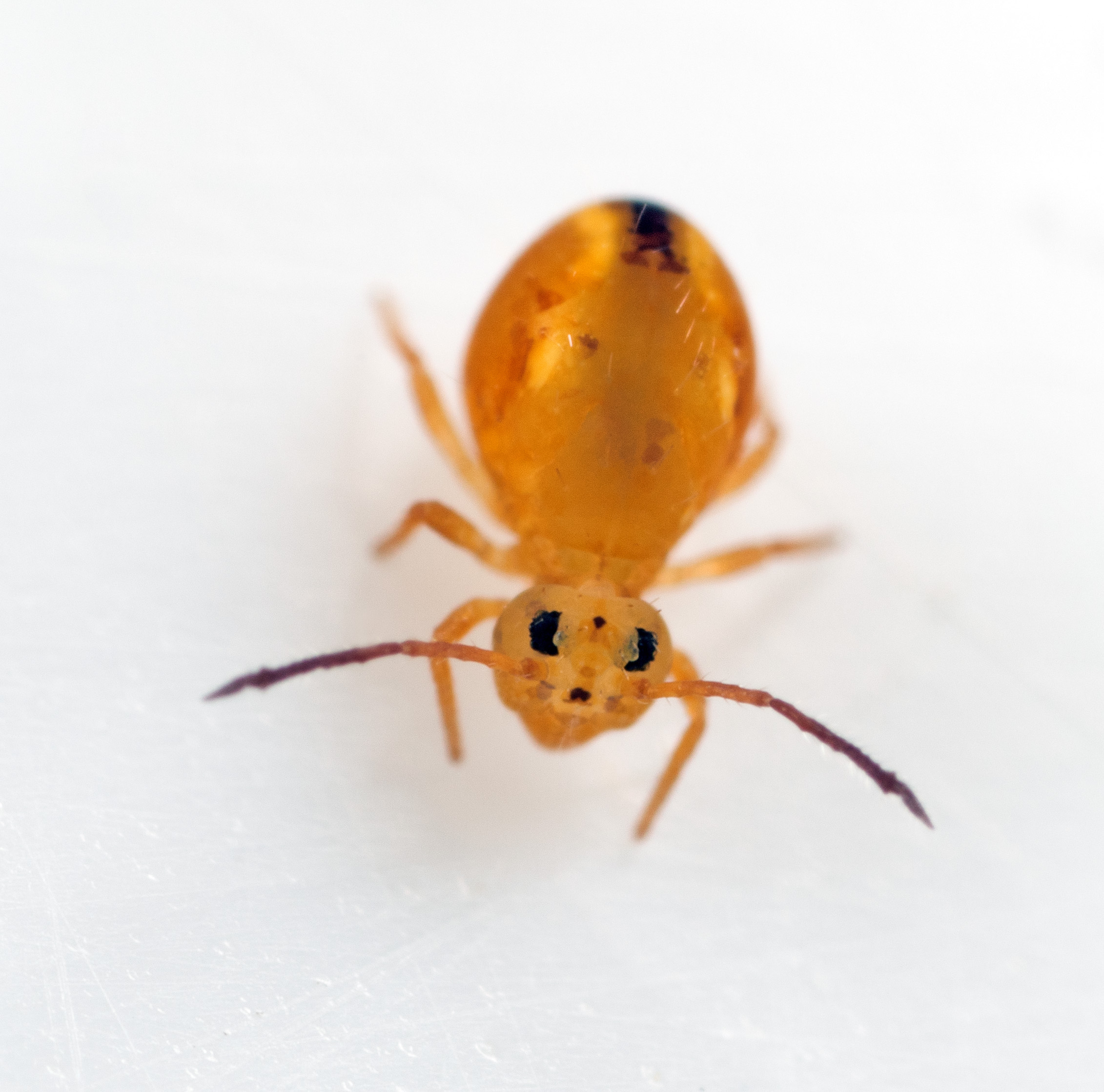

Scientific classification
- Kingdom: Animalia
- Phylum: Arthropoda
- Clade: Pancrustacea
- Class: Collembola
- Order: Symphypleona
- Family: Dicyrtomidae
- Genus: Dicyrtomina
- Species: D. minuta

Binomial name
- Dicyrtomina minuta (Fabricius, 1783)

Synonyms
- Dicyrtoma labellei Maynard, 1951; Dicyrtoma variabilis (Maynard, 1951); Podura minuta Fabricius, 1783

= Dicyrtomina minuta =

Species of arthropods

Dicyrtomina minuta is a species of globular springtails in the family Dicyrtomidae.

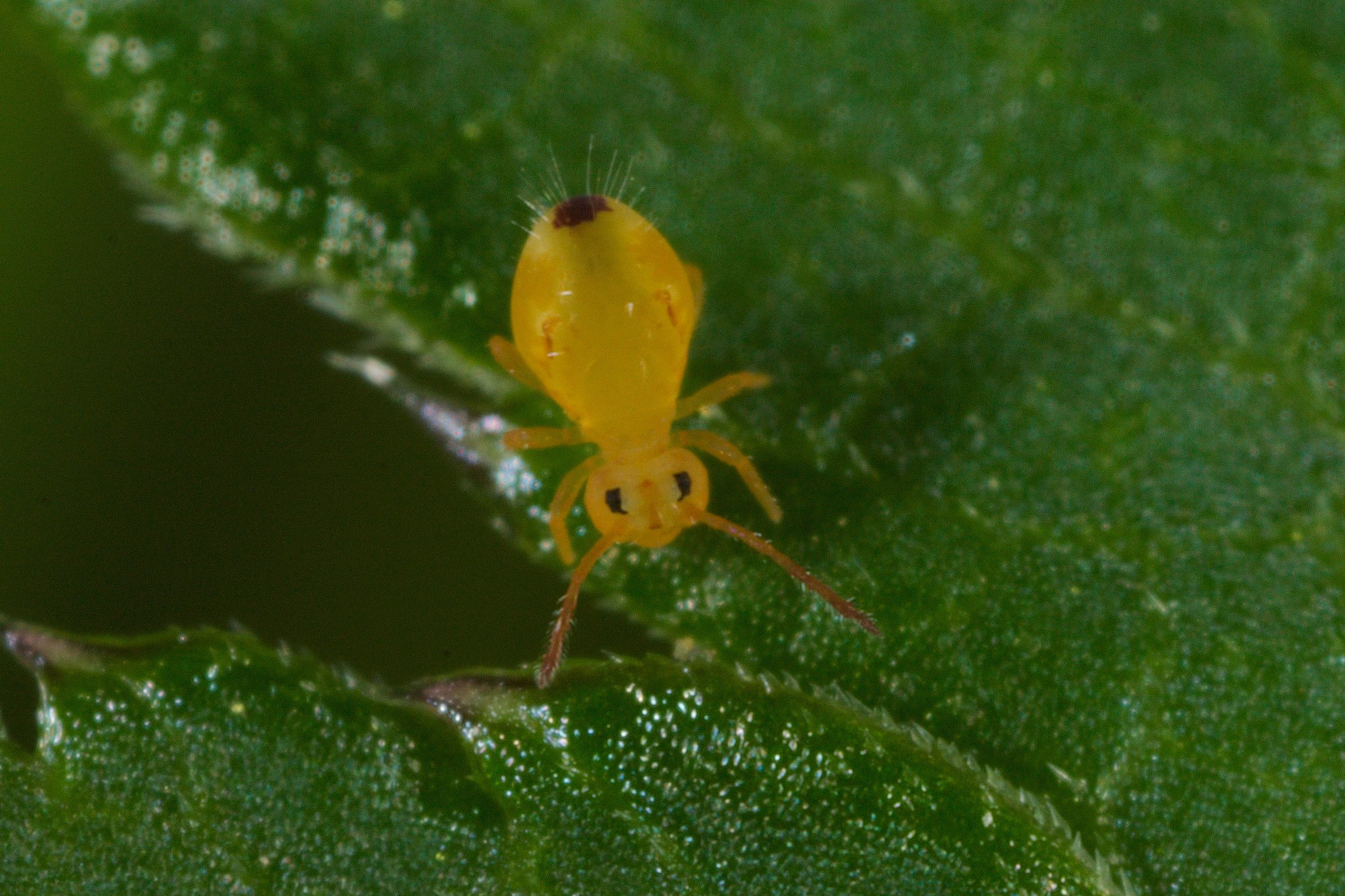
