= Margaret Roach (writer) =

Margaret Roach is an American journalist and author.

She writes the In The Garden column for The New York Times. She is the host of Way to Garden, a 25 minute weekly show that focuses on gardening. She is the former editorial director of Martha Stewart Living.

== Books ==
- A Way to Garden: A Hands-On Primer for Every Season
- with Ken Druse The Natural Habitat Garden
- The Backyard Parables (2013)
- And I Shall Have Some Peace There
