= Mackenziellidae =

Scientific classification
- Domain: Eukaryota
- Kingdom: Animalia
- Phylum: Arthropoda
- Class: Collembola
- Order: Symphypleona
- Family: Mackenziellidae; Yosii, 1961

Genera
- See text

Family of springtails

Mackenziellidae is a family of springtails belonging to the order Symphypleona.

== Genera ==
Mackenziellidae includes the following genera:

- Mackenziella Hammer, 1953
