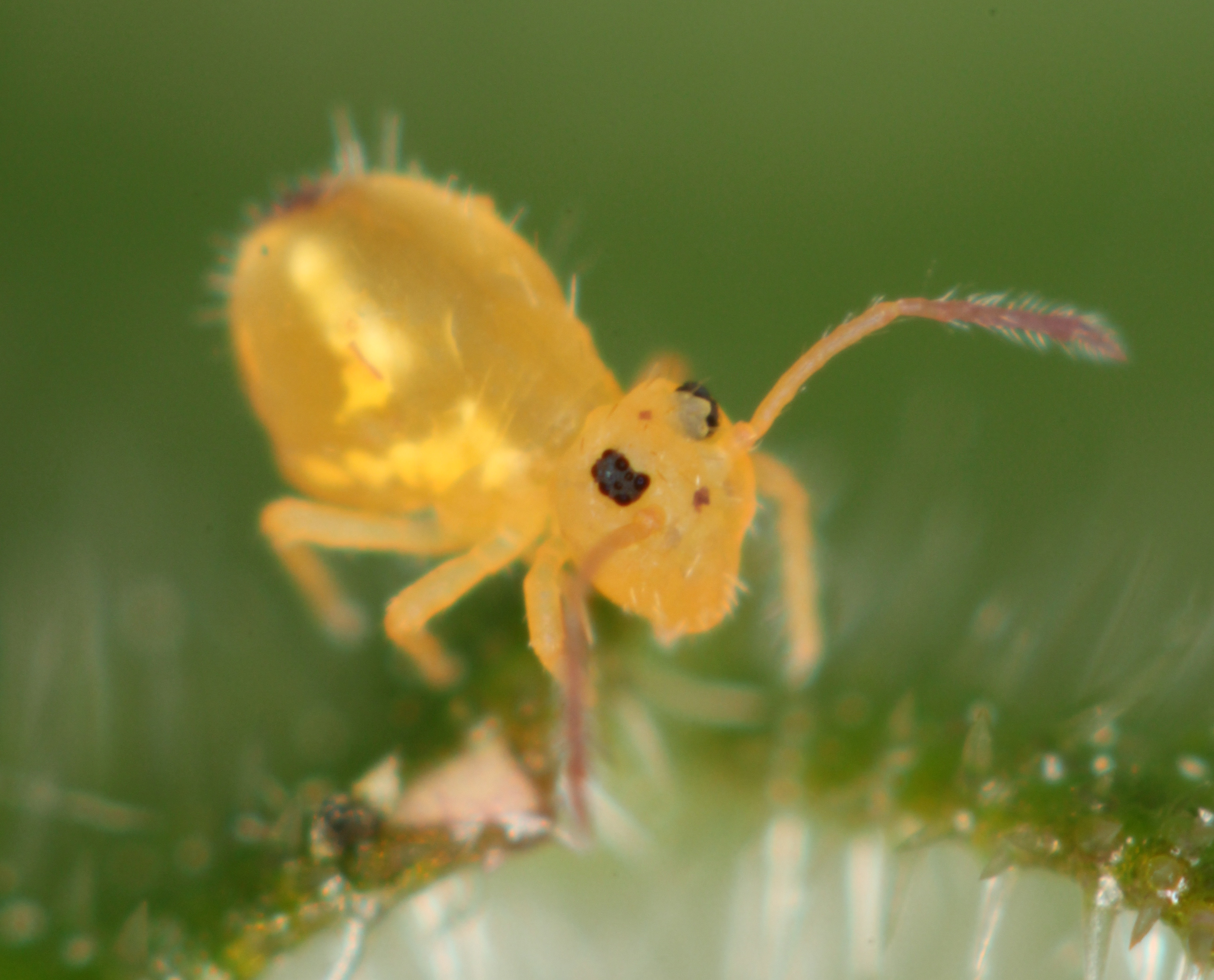
- Dicyrtomina minuta

Scientific classification
- Kingdom: Animalia
- Phylum: Arthropoda
- Clade: Pancrustacea
- Class: Collembola
- Order: Symphypleona
- Family: Dicyrtomidae
- Subfamily: Dicyrtominae
- Genus: Dicyrtomina; Börner, 1903

= Dicyrtomina =

Genus of springtails

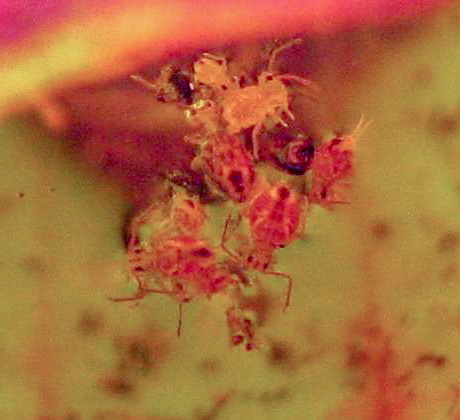
Dicyrtomina minuta inside a pitcher plant

Dicyrtomina is a genus of globular springtails in the family Dicyrtomidae.

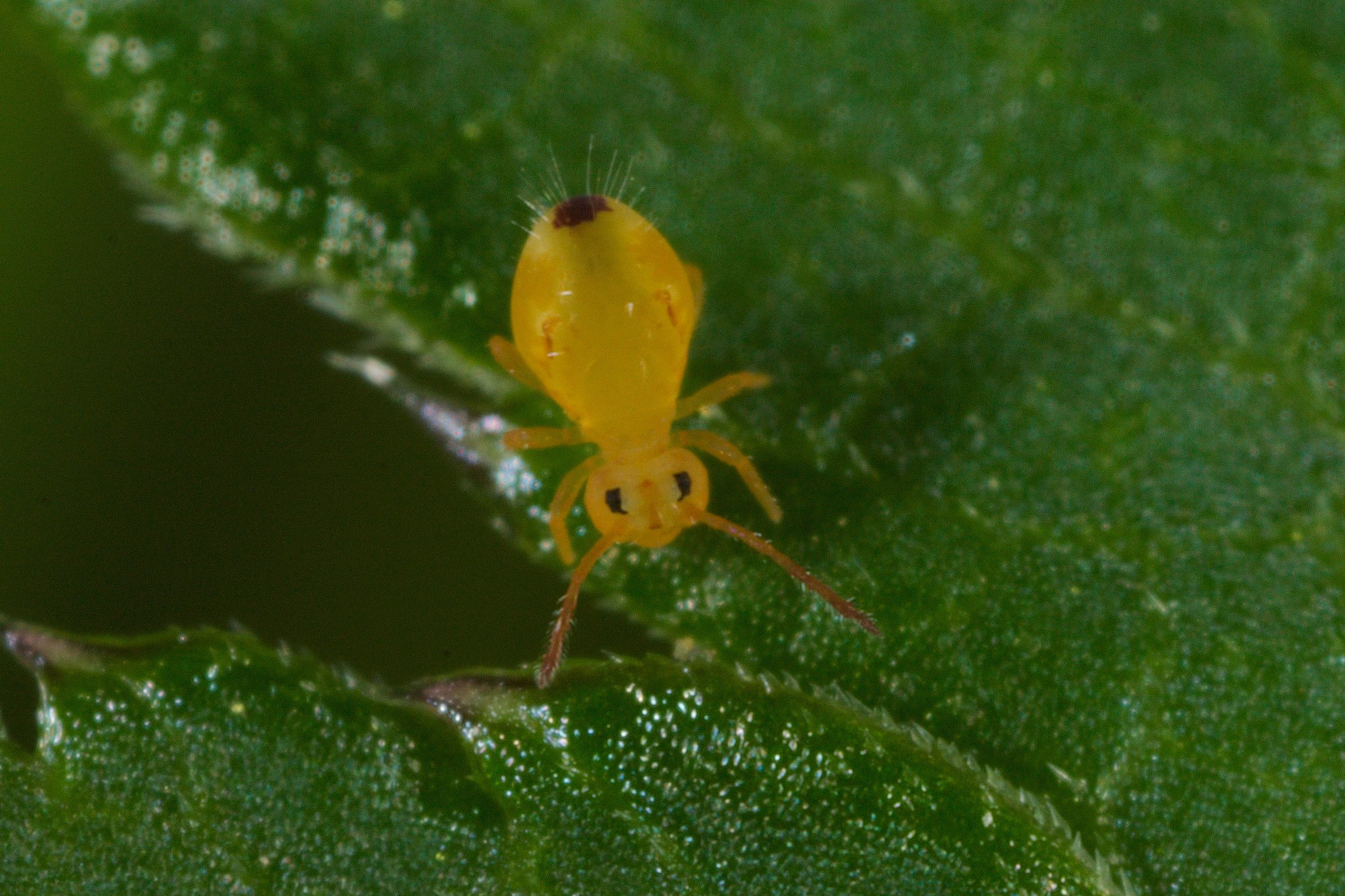
Dicyrtomina minuta

== Species ==
These species belong to the genus Dicyrtomina:

- Dicyrtomina africana Womersley, 1931^{g}
- Dicyrtomina cyanea Merlo & Najt, 1974^{g}
- Dicyrtomina dorsolineata R.Latzel, 1917^{g}
- Dicyrtomina ealana Marlier, 1945^{g}
- Dicyrtomina flavosignata (Tullberg, 1871)^{g}
- Dicyrtomina gigantisetae Lin & Xia, 1985^{g}
- Dicyrtomina insularis Carpenter, 1934^{g}
- Dicyrtomina minuta (O.Fabricius, 1783)^{i c g b}
- Dicyrtomina murphyi (C.Delamare Deboutteville & Z.Massoud, 1965)^{g}
- Dicyrtomina nigra Bretfeld, 2000^{g}
- Dicyrtomina novazealandica J.T.Salmon, 1941^{g}
- Dicyrtomina ochrea H.Womersley, 1939^{g}
- Dicyrtomina ornata (H.Nicolet, 1842)^{g}
- Dicyrtomina platensis (Merlo & Najt, 1974)^{g}
- Dicyrtomina saundersi (J.Lubbock, 1862)^{g}
- Dicyrtomina signata Stach, 1919^{g}
- Dicyrtomina spec (Nicolet, 1842)^{g}
- Dicyrtomina torsolimata Latzel, 1917^{g}
- Dicyrtomina tuberculata Womersley, 1933^{g}
- Dicyrtomina turbotti Salmon, 1948^{g}
- Dicyrtomina venusta R.Latzel, 1917^{g}
- Dicyrtomina violacea (Krausbauer, 1898)^{g}

Data sources: i = ITIS, c = Catalogue of Life, g = GBIF, b = Bugguide.net
