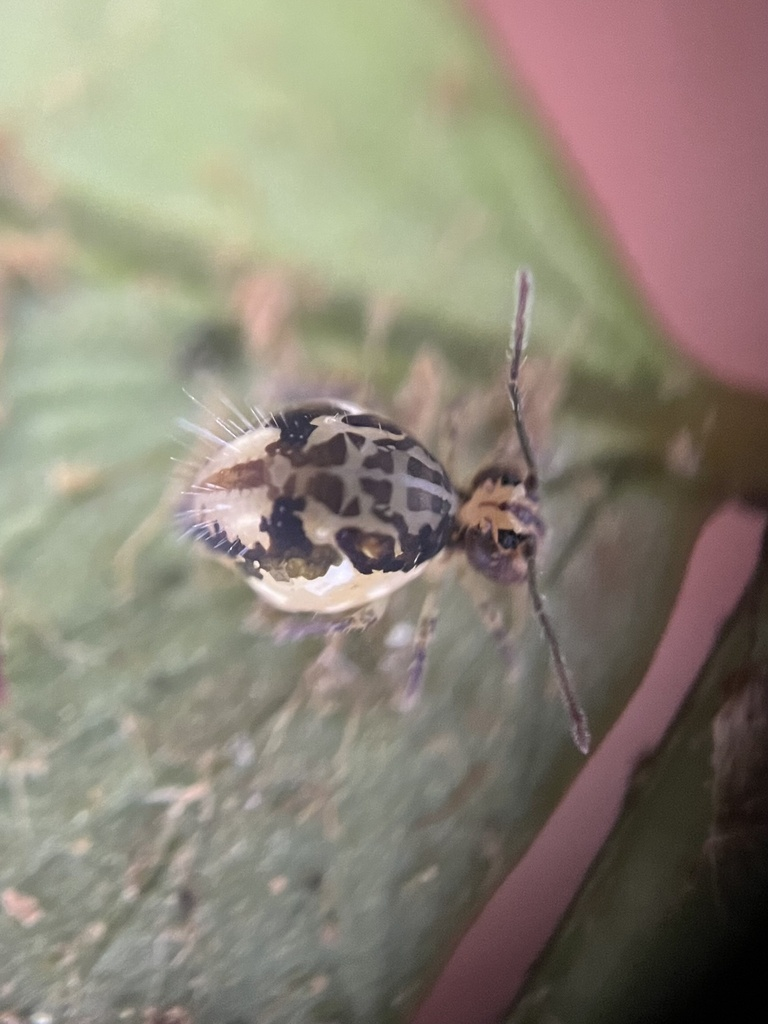

Scientific classification
- Kingdom: Animalia
- Phylum: Arthropoda
- Clade: Pancrustacea
- Class: Collembola
- Order: Symphypleona
- Family: Dicyrtomidae
- Genus: Ptenothrix
- Species: P. beta

Binomial name
- Ptenothrix beta (Christiansen & Bellinger, 1981)

= Ptenothrix beta =

Species of springtail

Ptenothrix beta is a species of springtail in the genus Ptenothrix. It is incredibly variable and ranges across the northwestern US.

== Appearance ==
This species is identified visually by dark polygons on the anterior abdomen, with a long tapering "carrot" of dark pigment on the posterior. Often the proximal parts of the legs are dark green, and the back "cheeks" of the head are uninterrupted dark brown.

This species has a large amount of morphological variation, and can have varied patterns. Despite this, the antenna are distinctly pronged and hairy, and the body is generally "bullet shaped".

== Green Form ==
There is a greenish form of this species going by the informal name Ptenothrix beta forma viridis. they were listed tentatively as Ptenothrix maculosa ssp. olympia but now it is evidence that it is more likely to be a form of Ptenothrix beta.

== Diet ==
This species generally is found either under/on sword fern fronds, cedar leaves, or even under dead logs and leaf litter.

== History ==
This species is one of the major five species that were mistaken for Ptenothrix maculosa originally (before Ptenothrix delongi was found to exist in the west coast), before early 2025, when antenna microscopy by citizen scientists revealed that it was indeed a separate species.

Soon after this was reviewed there was the realization that there seemed to be a distinct difference in the sides of the Ptenothrix delongi that were being mistaken as Ptenothrix beta.

Many of the Ptenothrix beta BugGuide records are outdated due to the fact that Belgian taxonomist Frans Janssens's website, Collembola.org used the same side images that had been previously caused the original misidentification. Frans was one of the only major springtail identifiers on BugGuide before his death in 2024, so there are still unresolved outdated IDs circulating.

== Description ==
This species was originally described as Dicyrtoma beta by Christiansen & Bellinger in 1981. The first preserved specimen was found in Puyallup, Washington in 1980 by Christiansen.
