= Calvatomina =

Scientific classification
- Kingdom: Animalia
- Phylum: Arthropoda
- Clade: Pancrustacea
- Class: Collembola
- Order: Symphypleona
- Family: Dicyrtomidae
- Genus: Calvatomina; Yosii, 1966

Genus of springtails

Calvatomina is a genus of springtails in the family Dicyrtomidae.

== Species ==
- Calvatomina alacris (Yosii, R, 1969:229)
- Calvatomina andrewarthai (Womersley, H, 1932:39) Betsch, J-M, 1980:147
- Calvatomina antenna Nguyen, 2017
- Calvatomina bellingeri (Snider, RJ, 1990:90)
- Calvatomina bougainvilleae (Yosii, 1960) Betsch, J-M, 1980:147
- Calvatomina brevifibra
- Calvatomina calva
- Calvatomina christianseni
- Calvatomina cruciata
- Calvatomina discolor
- Calvatomina formosana
- Calvatomina gladiata
- Calvatomina guyanensis
- Calvatomina lawrencei
- Calvatomina longidigita
- Calvatomina madestris
- Calvatomina microdentata
- Calvatomina modesta
- Calvatomina monodi
- Calvatomina nymphascopula
- Calvatomina opalina
- Calvatomina oryzae
- Calvatomina pagoda
- Calvatomina pallida
- Calvatomina pseudorufescens
- Calvatomina rossi
- Calvatomina rufescens
- Calvatomina scutellina
- Calvatomina solomonensis
- Calvatomina strigata
- Calvatomina superba
- Calvatomina sylvestratilis
- Calvatomina tesselata
- Calvatomina trivandrana
- Calvatomina tuberculata
- Calvatomina virgata
- Calvatomina yaeyamensis
