= Ken Druse =

American horticulturalist and author

Ken Druse is an American horticulturalist and author.

His book Making More Plants was named best book of the year by the American Horticultural Society and won the 2001 book of the Year from the Garden Writers Association.

== Books ==
- The Natural Shade Garden
- The New Shade Garden (Stewart, Tabori & Chang, 2015)
- Natural Companions: The Garden Lover's Guide to Plant Combinations (Stewart, Tabori & Chang, 2012)
- Making More Plants: The Science, Art, and Joy of Propagation (Stewart, Tabori & Chang, 2012)
- The Natural Habitat Garden (Timber Press, 2009)
- Ken Druse: The Passion for Gardening (Clarkson Potter, 2003)
- Ken Druse's Natural Garden Guides: Making More Plants (Clarkson Potter, 1998)
- Ken Druse's New York City Gardener: A How-to and Source Book for Gardening in the Big Apple (City & Co, 1996)
- The Collector's Garden: Designing with Extraordinary Plants (Clarkson Potter, 1996)
- Ken Druse's Natural Garden Guides: Shade Gardening (Clarkson Potter, 1992)
- Ken Druse's Natural Garden Guides: The Secret Garden (Clarkson Potter, 1992)
- Ken Druse's Natural Garden Guides: Garden Design (Clarkson Potter, 1990)
