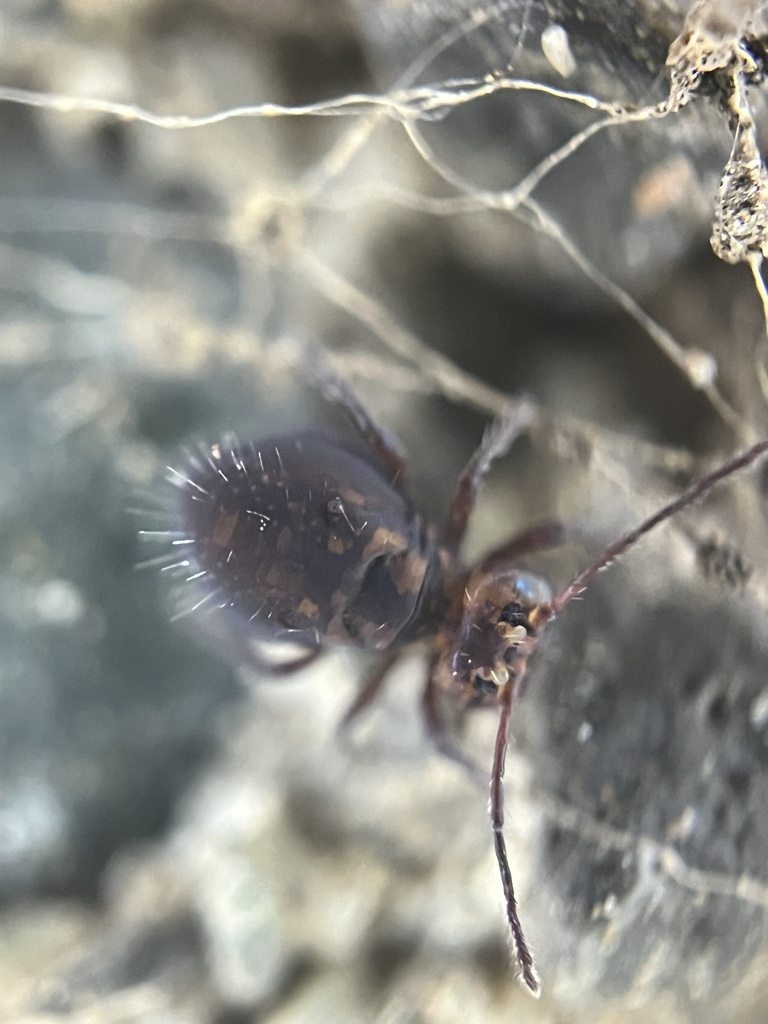
- 1. Dicyrtoma fusca found in Bryn-Mawr/Skyway, WA
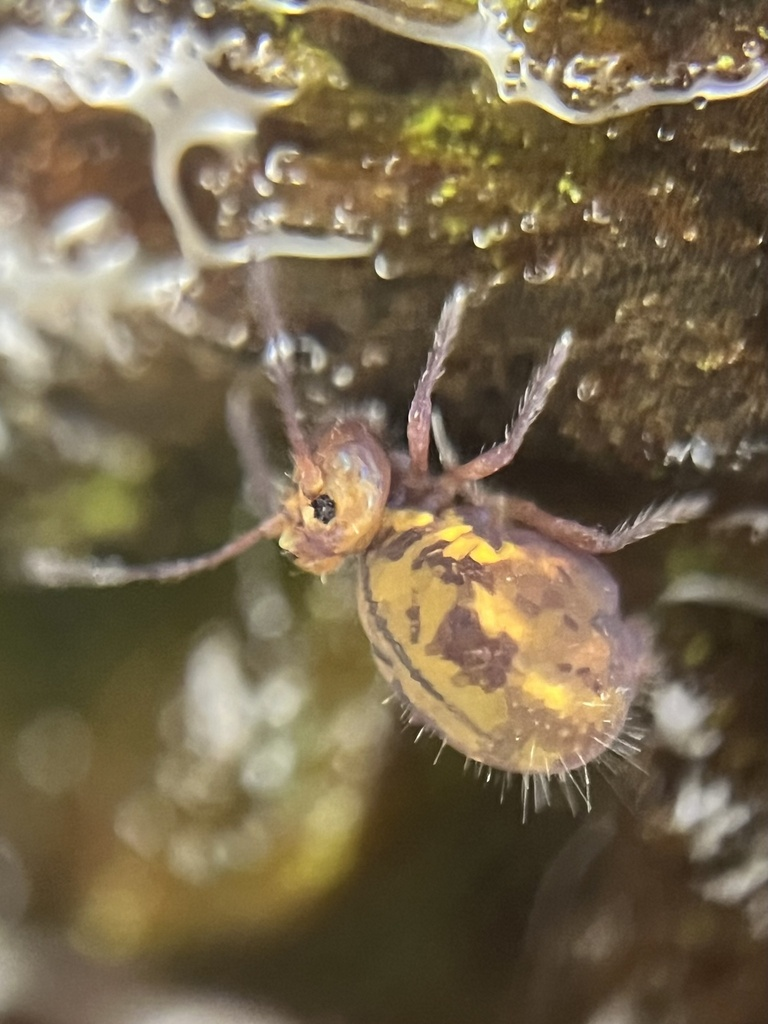
- 2. Dicyrtoma fusca Var 1. found at Seward Park, WA

Scientific classification
- Kingdom: Animalia
- Phylum: Arthropoda
- Clade: Pancrustacea
- Class: Collembola
- Order: Symphypleona
- Family: Dicyrtomidae
- Genus: Dicyrtoma
- Species: D. fusca

Binomial name
- Dicyrtoma fusca J.Lubbock, 1873

= Dicyrtoma fusca =

Species of springtail

Dicyrtoma fusca is a species of springtail found in the United States and Europe.

== Habitat ==
this species usually lives under wood or in wet soil.

Some variants have been known to be predatory, which has caused ecological issues in some areas of New Zealand.

== Appearance ==
This species is reddish in coloration overall with two intersecting dorsal stripes creating a cross shape on the back. The lighter colored form is yellowish red, while the darker form is dark red. It has distinct pronged antennae characteristic of the wider genus Dicyrtoma.

== Subspecies ==
A lighter yellow variation of this species with a back stripe has been referred to Dicyrtoma fusca Var 1.

This species has the distinct subspecies Dicyrtoma fusca var. rufescens, which has the same distinctive antennae, but is predominantly European and has discolored yellowish eyes alongside dark red patterning.

== Recent introductions ==
This species was discovered recently as an introduction to Washington State, where its range has slowly expanded. It was likely introduced from soil coming into the port of Seattle, and spread from there.

This species has also been introduced to the east coast of North America where it is less common but still is notable for having been recorded before the Western introductions were discovered.

This species has also been introduced to New Zealand.

== Ecology ==
This species has been recently been recorded as predatory, especially the European variant that was introduced to New Zealand. this has raised concerns about potential ecological consequences to the introduction of this species to New Zealand.

== Naming ==
Dicyrtoma fusca was described by Sir John Lubbock in his article British springtails and thysanura (Collembola) in 1873. It was originally named Dicyrtoma atropurpurea by Abbé Bourlet in Mémoire sur les l'ordre des Thysanoures in 1842.
