= The Collembola of North America, North of the Rio Grande: A Taxonomic Analysis =

The Collembola of North America, North of the Rio Grande: A Taxonomic Analysis, also termed "C&B" (a acronym using the initials of the authors, Kenneth Christiansen and Peter Bellinger) within the springtail community, is a four-book series used to key various species of springtails.

C&B is generally considered the most up to date resource even though it was published before many modern resources became available.

It can be accessed via the Grinnell College library as multiple PDF documents.
