= Kenneth A. Christiansen =

American speleobiologist and Collembola systematist (1924–2017)

- Born: June 24, 1924; United States
- Died: November 26, 2017 (aged 93); Grinnell, Iowa
- Citizenship: United States
- Education: Harvard University; Boston University
- Known for: Collembola study
- Awards: Bronze Star Medal
- Scientific career
- Fields: entomologist, speleologist
- Workplaces: Grinnell College
- Thesis: Study of the genus Entomobrya (Entomobryidae, Collembola) (1951)
- Author abbrev. (zoology): Christiansen
- Website: https://subtbiol.pensoft.net/article/22905/

Kenneth А. Christiansen (June 24, 1924 – November 26, 2017) was an American entomologist, speleologist, and systematist of springtails (Collembola), and a professor at Grinnell College.

== Biography ==
He was born on June 24, 1924.

During World War II, Christiansen served as a forward observer for a mortar platoon in the 2nd Armored Division. Participated in battles in France.

He earned a bachelor's degree from Boston University.

He received his Ph.D. from Harvard University in 1951 for his study of the genus Entomobrya (Entomobryidae).

He began teaching at the American University of Beirut in Lebanon and at Smith College. He frequently traveled to Switzerland for consultations with European springtail experts Gisin and Delamare Deboutteville.

Starting in 1955, he taught at Grinnell College, where he taught courses in general biology, zoology, evolution, ecology, sociobiology, invertebrate zoology, entomology, parasitology, and marine biology.

He was known for his lectures on atheism.

In 1962, he was appointed a professor of biology, and in 1994, he was named a professor emeritus.

His research, starting with his doctoral dissertation, focused on the evolution and taxonomy of springtails. He wrote over 60 articles and two books on the subject.

As a speleologist, he was known for describing nearly 50 new species of cave springtails out of the 60 known species in the United States.

Concurrently, he served on the Iowa Governor's Science Advisory Council (1977–1983 and 1989–1997).

He died on November 26, 2017, in Grinnell, Iowa.

== Awards and honors ==
- Bronze Star Medal with Oak Leaf Cluster — for bravery in battle during World War II.

== Bibliography ==
Key publications:

- Christiansen K. A. Bionomics of Collembola // Annual Review of Entomology. 1964. 9: 147–178.
- Christiansen K. A. Competition between collembolan species in culture jars // Revue d’Ecologie et de Biology du Sol. 1967. 4: 439–462.
- Christiansen K. A., Bellinger P. F. Collembola from Hawaiian caves // Pan Pacific Entomologist. 1974. 16: 31–40.
- Christiansen K. A., Bellinger P. F. The Collembola of North America North of the Rio Grande: 4 volumes. Grinnell College, 1980–1981; Revised Edition, 1998.
- Christiansen K. A., Bellinger P. F. The biogeography of Collembola // Polskie Pismo Entomologiczne. 1995. 64: 279–294.
- Christiansen K. A., Bellinger P. F. Collembola // In Encyclopedia of Insects. Amsterdam: Academic Press/Elsevier, 2003. 235–239.
- Baquero E., Martinez M., Christiansen K., Jordana R. A new genus and species of Entomobryidae (Collembola Entomobryomorpha) from the Iberian Peninsula // Entomological News. 2004. 115: 229–235.
