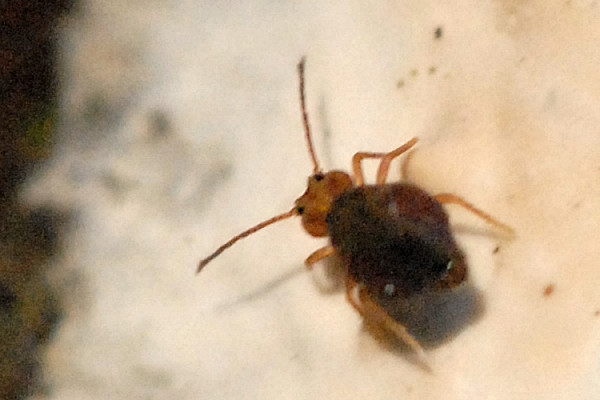

Scientific classification
- Kingdom: Animalia
- Phylum: Arthropoda
- Clade: Pancrustacea
- Class: Collembola
- Order: Symphypleona
- Superfamily: Dicyrtomoidea
- Family: Dicyrtomidae; Borner, 1906

Genera
- See text

= Dicyrtomidae =

Family of springtails

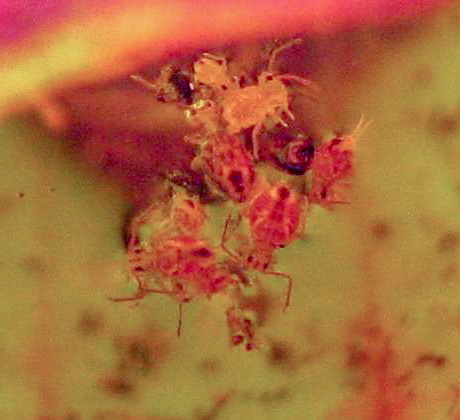
Dicyrtomina minuta caught in (Sarracenia)

Dicyrtomidae is a family of Collembola in the order Symphypleona, and it is the only family of the superfamily Dicyrtomoidea. It includes more than 200 species in eight genera.

== Genera ==
According to Checklist of the Collembola of the World:

- Dicyrtominae Börner, 1906
  - Calvatomina Yosii, 1966
  - Dicyrtoma Bourlet, 1842
  - Dicyrtomina Börner, 1903
  - Gibberathrix Uchida, 1952
  - Jordanathrix Bretfeld & Arbea, 1999
- Ptenothricinae Richards, 1968
  - Bothriovulsus Richards, 1968
  - Papirioides Folsom, 1924
  - Ptenothrix Börner, 1906

== See also ==
- List of Dicyrtomidae species
