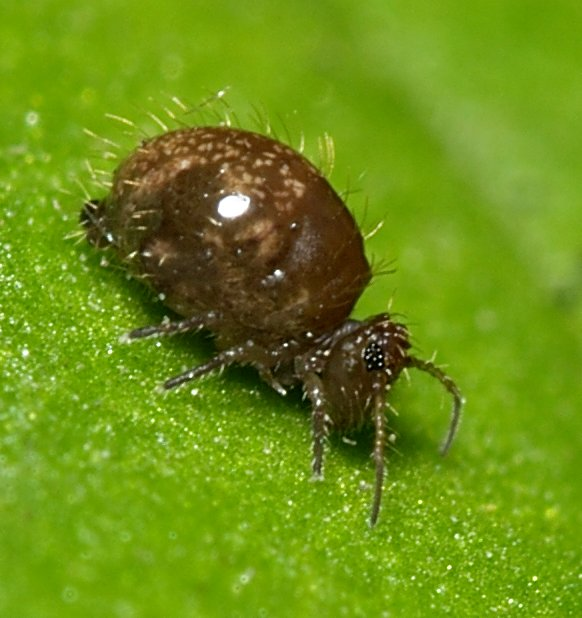
- Allacma fusca from forest near Cologne, Germany

Scientific classification
- Kingdom: Animalia
- Phylum: Arthropoda
- Class: Collembola
- Order: Symphypleona

Superfamilies
- Dicyrtomoidea; Katiannoidea; Sminthuroidea; Sminthurididoidea; Sturmioidea

Synonyms
- Neopleona

= Symphypleona =

Order of springtails

The order Symphypleona, also known as the globular springtails, is one of the three main groups of springtails (Collembola), tiny hexapods related to insects. When the springtails were still believed to be an order of insects, the Symphypleona were ranked as a suborder.

They can be best distinguished from the other springtail groups by their body shape. The Symphypleona are very round animals, almost spherical, and usually have long antennae. The Poduromorpha, by contrast, always have short legs and a plump body, but more oval in shape than the Symphypleona. The Entomobryomorpha are the slimmest springtails, some with long and some with short legs and antennae, but always with a very slender body.

== Systematics ==
The Symphypleona order was previously suggested to also contain family Neelidae, as a very apomorphic relative in the Sminthuridae superfamily. Phylogenetic studies however suggest Neelidae to be the only family of Neelipleona order.

=== Families ===
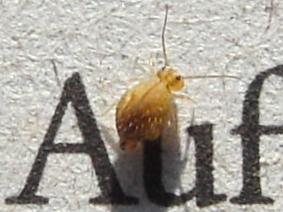
Sminthurus nigromaculatus Sminthuridae

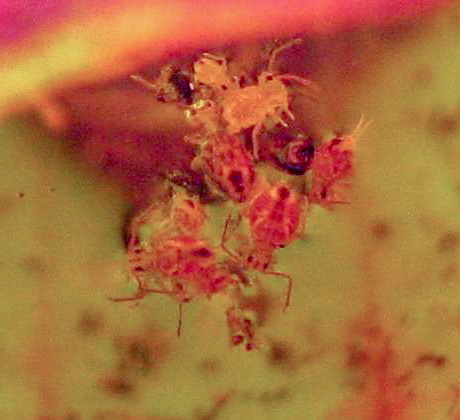
Dicyrtomina minuta inside a pitcher plant

The following is a list of the families within Symphypleona, grouped by superfamily. It includes extinct families known only from fossil remains.

- Superfamily Sminthuridoidea

- Family Mackenziellidae
- Family Sminthurididae

- Superfamily Katiannoidea

- Family Katiannidae
- Family Spinothecidae
- Family Arrhopalitidae
- Family Collophoridae

- Superfamily Sturmioidea

- Family Sturmiidae

- Superfamily Sminthuroidea

- Family Sminthuridae
- Family Bourletiellidae

- Superfamily Dicyrtomoidea

- Family Dicyrtomidae
