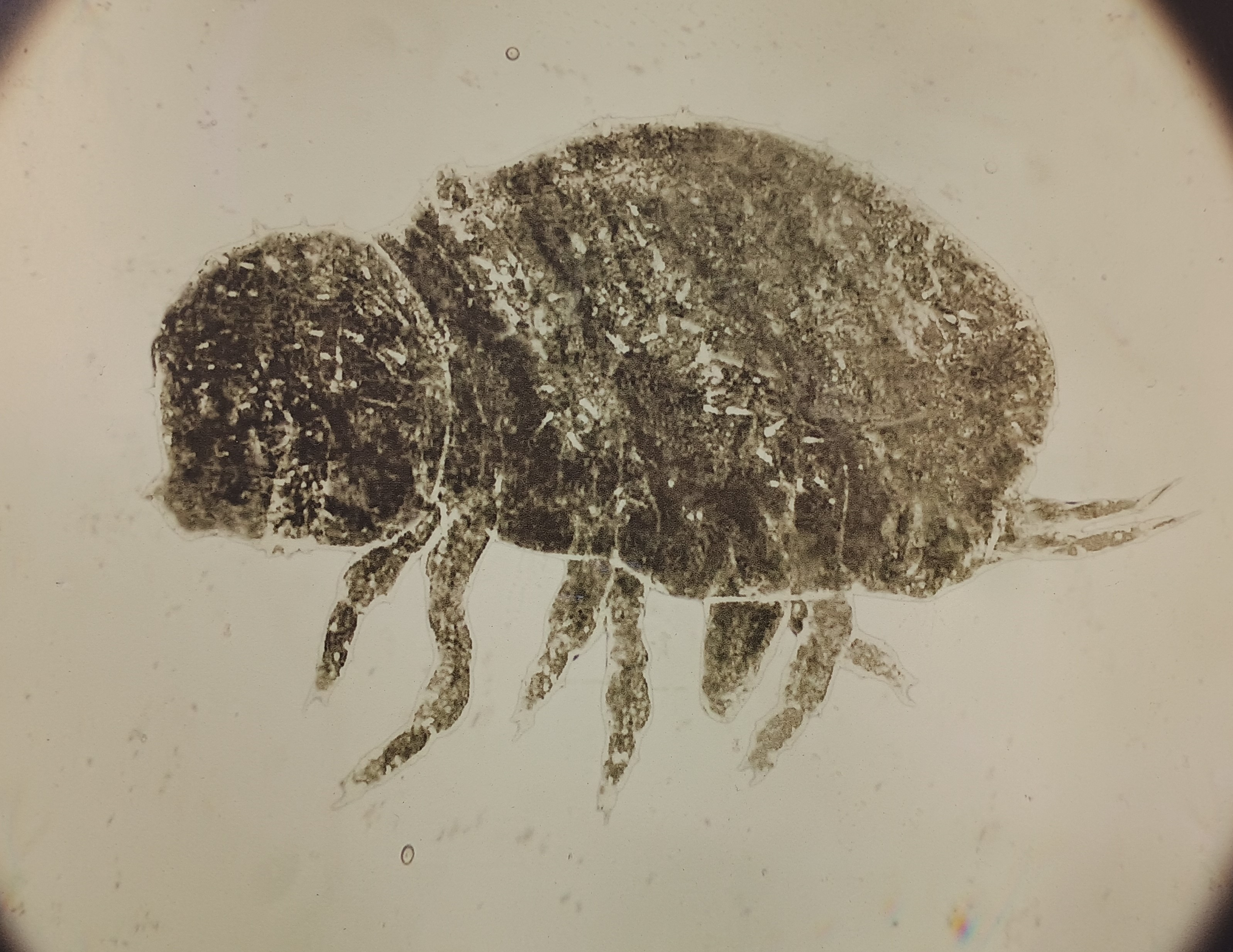

Scientific classification
- Kingdom: Animalia
- Phylum: Arthropoda
- Clade: Pancrustacea
- Class: Collembola
- Order: Neelipleona
- Family: Neelidae
- Genus: Megalothorax
- Species: M. sanctistephani

Binomial name
- Megalothorax sanctistephani E.Christian, 1998

= Megalothorax sanctistephani =

Species of springtail

Megalothorax sanctistephani is a springtail that is only known from the catacombs of the St. Stephen's Cathedral in Vienna, Austria.

== Characteristics ==
They are only around 0.39 mm in size, blind and spherical in shape. They resemble the species Megalothorax minimus, which can be found world-wide. They can be differentiated by the oval structure that they feature between their antenna, rather than a bristle. Typical characteristics of cave dwellers (troglomorphic characteristics) are not present, such as elongated extremities; therefore it is assumed that the species is more adapted to narrow spaced subterranean biotopes, rather than caves.

== Distribution ==
The species is only known from the location of its initial description, the catacombs of St. Stephen's Cathedral in Vienna, which date back to the Baroque period. Its overall range likely includes the Pannonian lowlands and hill country of Austria. It lives in the system of crevices within the Pleistocene sediments of the Vienna city terrace. Specimens were found beneath the clay floor of the catacombs. The species' conservation status is unknown.

== Etymology ==
The species is named after the patron of the type locality, Saint Stephen. His iconographic attribute - a handful of stones symbolizing his death by stoning - also alludes to the species' habitat, the gravel of the catacombs.
