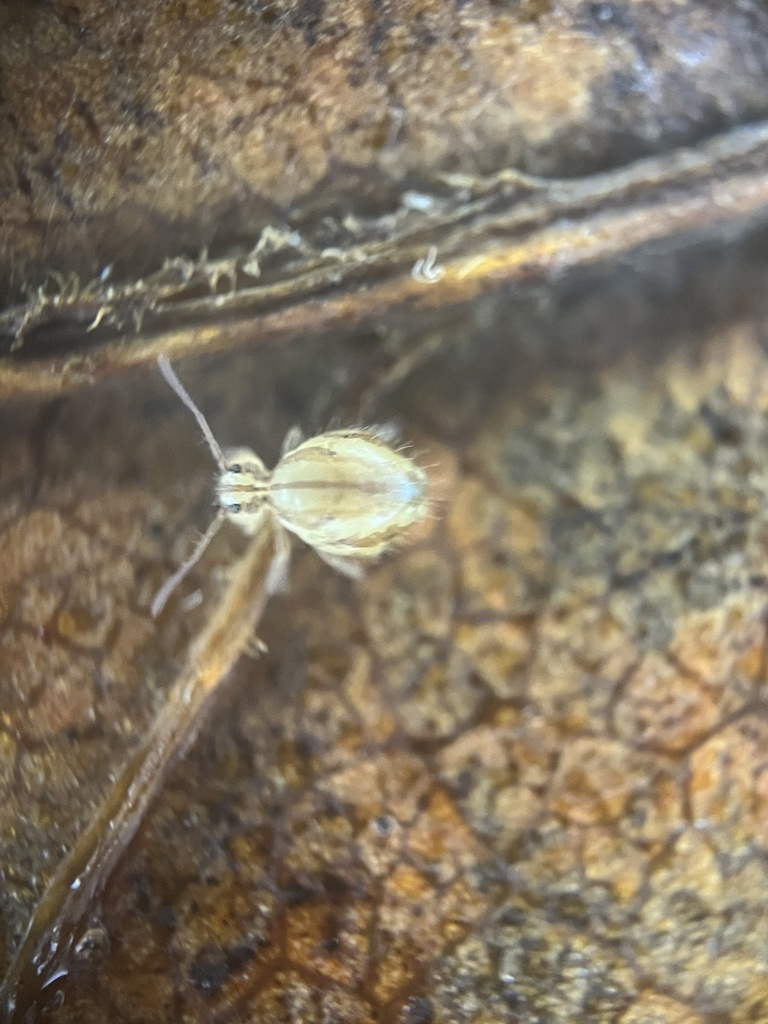

Scientific classification
- Kingdom: Animalia
- Phylum: Arthropoda
- Clade: Pancrustacea
- Class: Collembola
- Order: Symphypleona
- Family: Sminthuridae
- Genus: Sminthurus
- Species: S. mencenbergae

Binomial name
- Sminthurus mencenbergae Snider, 1983

= Sminthurus mencenbergae =

Species of springtail

Sminthurus mencenbergae is a species of springtail in the genus Sminthurus that is endemic to the east coast of North America.

This species is normally light brown, with dark brown line patterns forming a 2 pronged v, through a dorsal line. the face usually has three stripes, two in the side, one in the middle. antenna are 2-3 segmented and a little spikey.

Many cases also have a dark cross line through the middle dorsal stripe.
