= Neosminthurus richardsi =

Scientific classification
- Domain: Eukaryota
- Kingdom: Animalia
- Phylum: Arthropoda
- Class: Collembola
- Order: Symphypleona
- Family: Sminthuridae
- Genus: Neosminthurus
- Species: N. richardsi

Binomial name
- Neosminthurus richardsi Snider, 1978

Species of springtail

Neosminthurus richardsi is a species of globular springtail in the family Sminthuridae.
