= Sphyrotheca minnesotensis =

Scientific classification
- Kingdom: Animalia
- Phylum: Arthropoda
- Class: Collembola
- Order: Symphypleona
- Family: Sminthuridae
- Genus: Sphyrotheca
- Species: S. minnesotensis

Binomial name
- Sphyrotheca minnesotensis (Guthrie, 1903)

Species of globular springtail

Sphyrotheca minnesotensis is a species of globular springtail in the family Sminthuridae.
