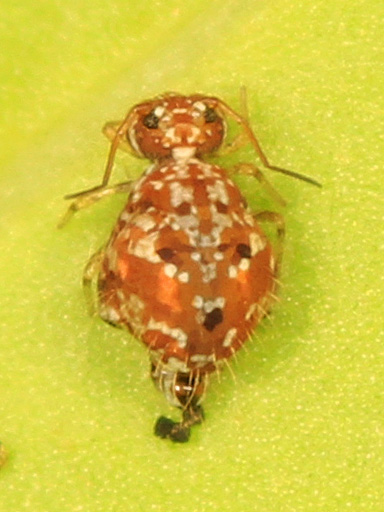

Scientific classification
- Domain: Eukaryota
- Kingdom: Animalia
- Phylum: Arthropoda
- Class: Collembola
- Order: Symphypleona
- Family: Sminthuridae
- Genus: Sminthurus
- Species: S. medialis

Binomial name
- Sminthurus medialis Mills, 1934

= Sminthurus medialis =

Species of springtail

Sminthurus medialis is a species of globular springtail in the family Sminthuridae.
