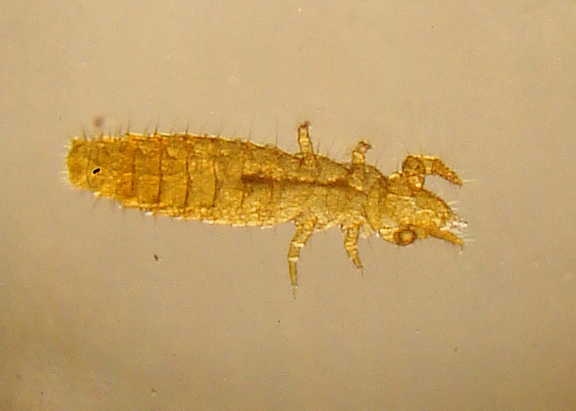
- Proturan specimen (Acerentomon sp.)

Scientific classification
- Kingdom: Animalia
- Phylum: Arthropoda
- Clade: Pancrustacea
- Clade: Allotriocarida
- Subphylum: Hexapoda

Groups included
- Collembola (springtails); Diplura (two-pronged bristletails); Protura (coneheads)

Cladistically included but traditionally excluded taxa
- Insecta (insects)

= Entognatha =

Group of wingless and ametabolous arthropods

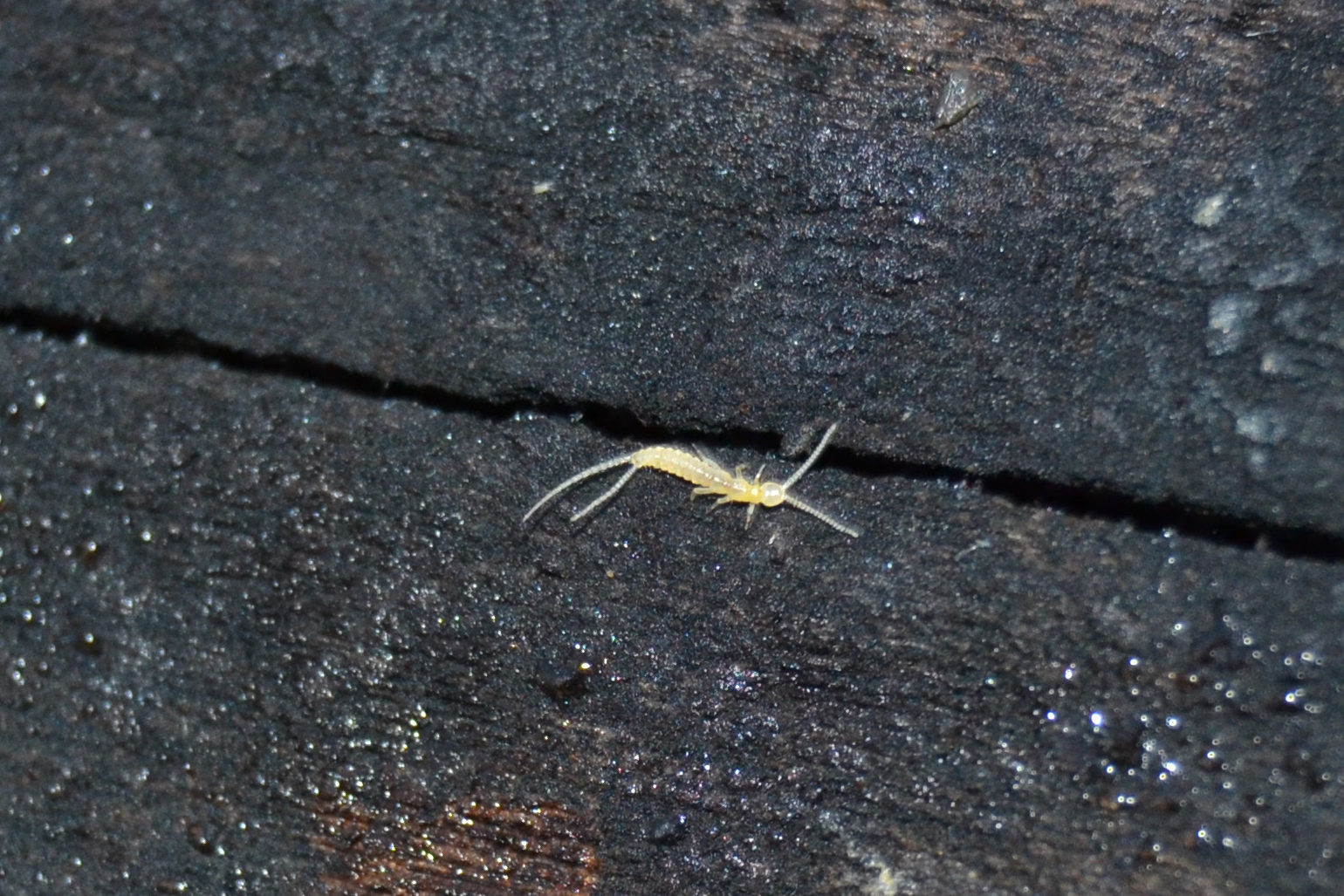
Diplura, a Two-pronged Bristletail — not closely related to three-pronged bristletails in the Archaeognatha

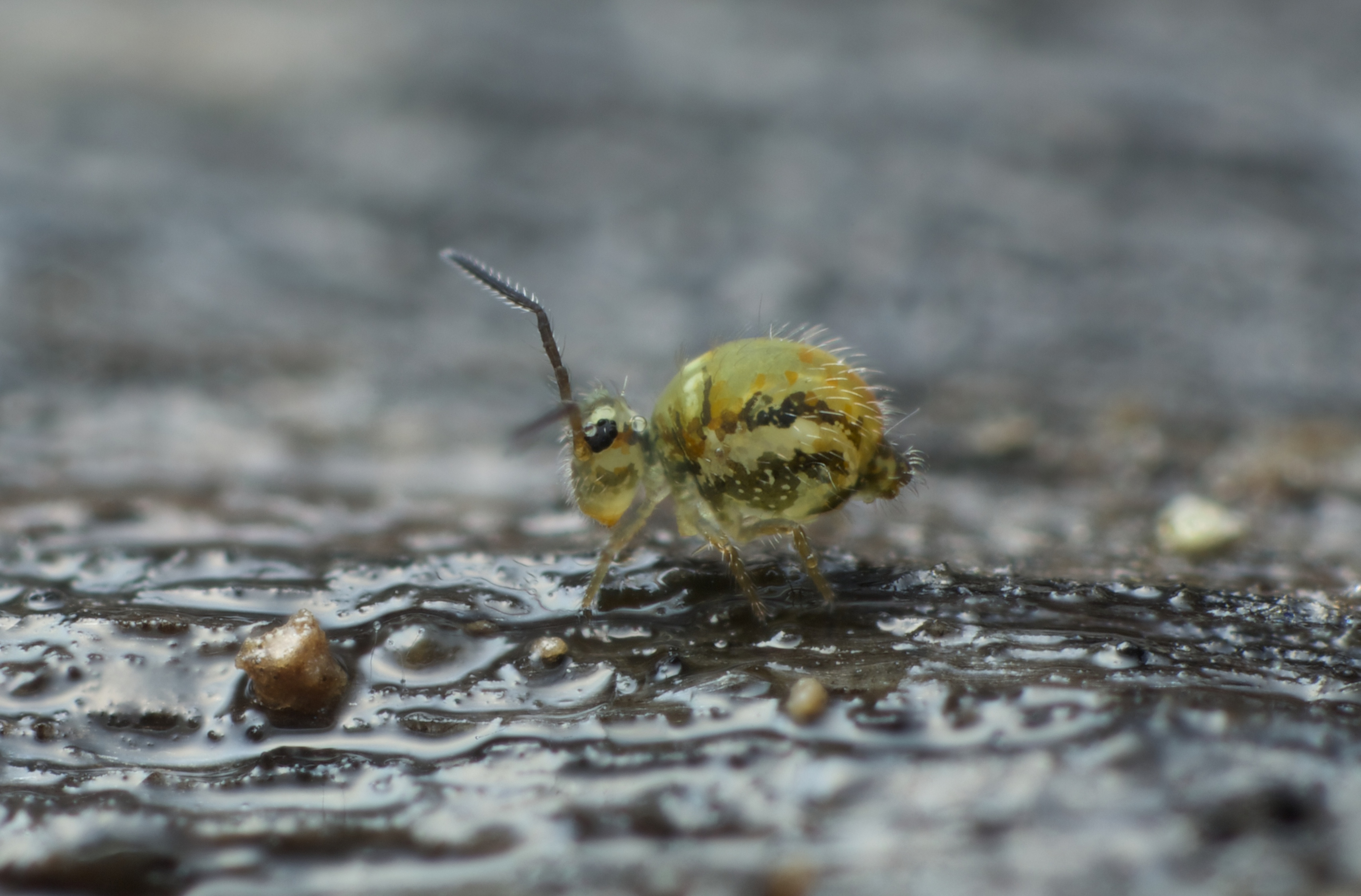
Collembola, family Sminthuridae

The Entognatha (from Ancient Greek ἐντός (entós), meaning "inside", and γνάθος (gnáthos), meaning "jaw") are a polyphyletic group of wingless and ametabolous arthropods, which, together with the insects, makes up the subphylum Hexapoda. Their mouthparts are entognathous, meaning that they are retracted within the head, unlike the insects. Entognatha are apterous, meaning that they lack wings. The group contains three classes: Collembola (springtails, 9000 species), Diplura ("two-tail", 1000 species) and Protura ("first-tail", 800 species). These three groups were historically united with the now-obsolete order Thysanura to form the subclass Apterygota, but it has since been recognized that these orders might not be closely related, and Entognatha and Apterygota are now both considered to be paraphyletic groups.

== Morphology ==
These minute arthropods are apterous, unlike some orders of insects that have lost their wings secondarily (but are derived from winged ancestors). Their mouthparts are enclosed within a pouch in the head capsule, called the gnathal pouch, so only the tips of the mandibles and maxillae are exposed beyond the cavity. This pouch is created in the embryo by a flap or lateral head sclerite near the mouth on each side of the head which fuses with the labium. Other differences from insects are that each antennal segment is musculated; in insects, only the two basal segments are. Sperm transfer is always indirect, and there is an ovipositor in the females. Of the three orders, only collembolans possess eyes; nevertheless, many collembolans are blind, and even when compound eyes are present, there are no more than eight ommatidia.

- Collembolans have a ventral tube termed a collophore on the first abdominal segment. The collophore is involved in moisture absorption. On the third abdominal segment is the retinaculum that holds the furcula. The furcula is the "spring" for which the Collembola are given the name springtails.
- Proturans, sometimes referred to as "coneheads", do not have eyes or antennae. They possess a telson and abdominal styli thought to be vestigial legs.
- Diplurans have a pair of caudal cerci, from which their name, meaning "two-tailed", is derived. They also possess abdominal styli.
