= Sminthurus fitchi =

Scientific classification
- Kingdom: Animalia
- Phylum: Arthropoda
- Clade: Pancrustacea
- Class: Collembola
- Order: Symphypleona
- Family: Sminthuridae
- Genus: Sminthurus
- Species: S. fitchi

Binomial name
- Sminthurus fitchi Folsom, 1896

Synonyms
- Sminthurus obscurus Mills, 1934; Sminthurus trilineatus Banks, 1903

Species of springtail

Sminthurus fitchi is a species of globular springtail in the family Sminthuridae.
