= Neosminthurus clavatus =

Scientific classification
- Kingdom: Animalia
- Phylum: Arthropoda
- Class: Collembola
- Order: Symphypleona
- Family: Sminthuridae
- Genus: Neosminthurus
- Species: N. clavatus

Binomial name
- Neosminthurus clavatus (Banks, 1897)

Synonyms
- Neosminthurus curvisetis (Guthrie, 1903); Neosminthurus purpureus Guthrie, 1903; Sminthurus curvisetis Scott, 1964

Species of springtail

Neosminthurus clavatus is a species of globular springtails in the family Sminthuridae, found in Mexico and Central America.
