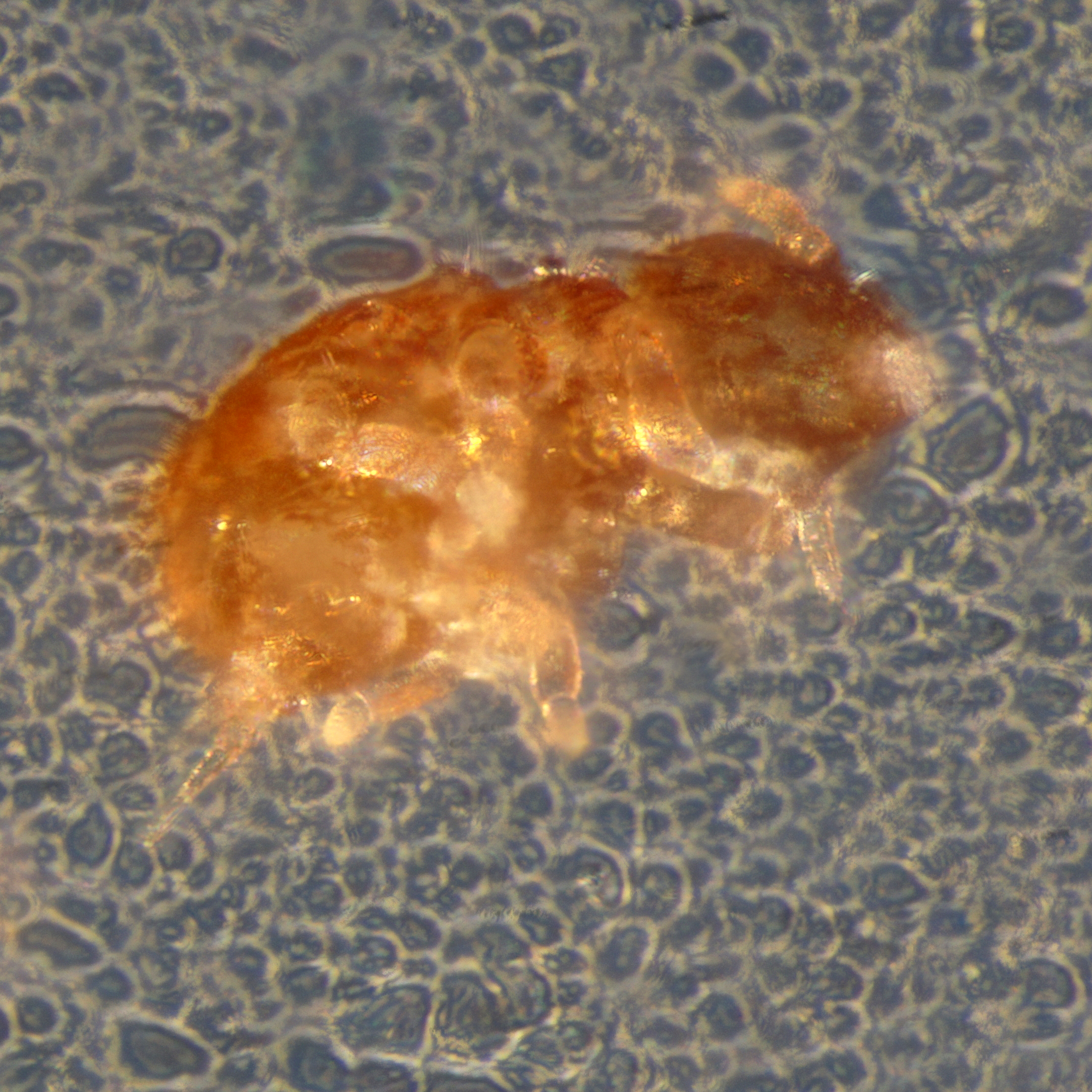

Scientific classification
- Kingdom: Animalia
- Phylum: Arthropoda
- Clade: Pancrustacea
- Class: Collembola
- Order: Neelipleona
- Family: Neelidae
- Genus: Megalothorax
- Species: M. minimus

Binomial name
- Megalothorax minimus Willem, 1900

Synonyms
- Neelus maculosus Maynard, 1951; Neelus minimus (Willem, 1900)

= Megalothorax minimus =

Species of springtail

Megalothorax minimus is a species of springtail in the family Neelidae. It is found primarily in Europe, but has also been observed in North America.
