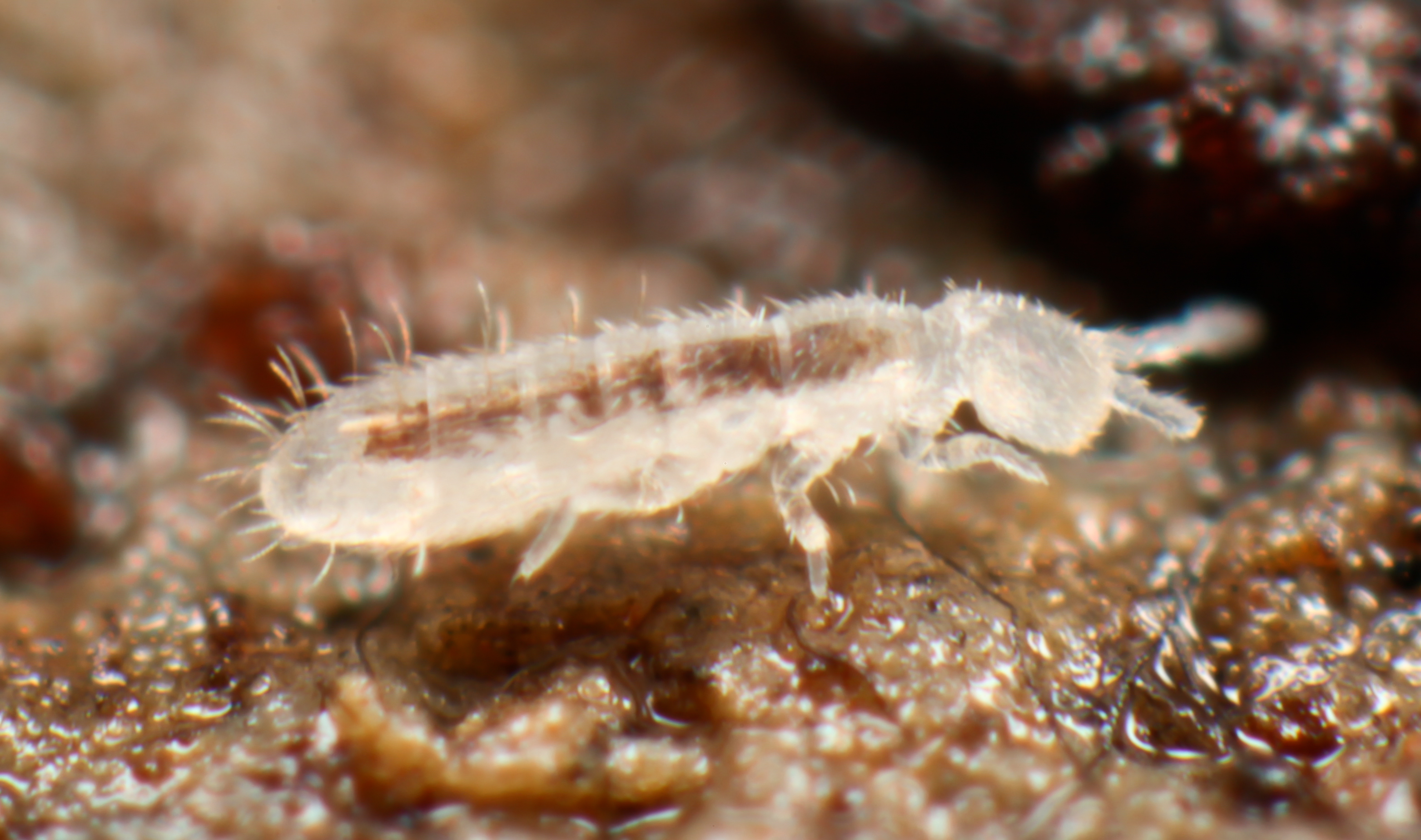

Scientific classification
- Kingdom: Animalia
- Phylum: Arthropoda
- Class: Collembola
- Order: Entomobryomorpha
- Family: Isotomidae
- Genus: Folsomia
- Species: F. fimetaria

Binomial name
- Folsomia fimetaria Linnaeus, 1758

= Folsomia fimetaria =

Species of springtail

Folsomia fimetaria is an elongate-bodied springtail of the genus Folsomia. It differs from other members of the Folsomia genus, in that the ventral setae on the third segment of the thorax are absent. It its maxillary head their lamella 1 is fan-shaped and has a double fringe, also its apical row has complex cilia. F. fimetaria inhabits in rich organic soils, disturbed biotopes and cities. It also seems to be a high-quality prey, since, when eaten by Bembidion lampros they seem to improve their fecundity and their larval survival.
