= Sminthurus incisus =

Scientific classification
- Domain: Eukaryota
- Kingdom: Animalia
- Phylum: Arthropoda
- Class: Collembola
- Order: Symphypleona
- Family: Sminthuridae
- Genus: Sminthurus
- Species: S. incisus

Binomial name
- Sminthurus incisus Snider, 1978

Species of springtail

Sminthurus incisus is a species of globular springtail in the family Sminthuridae.
