= Sminthurus butcheri =

Scientific classification
- Domain: Eukaryota
- Kingdom: Animalia
- Phylum: Arthropoda
- Class: Collembola
- Order: Symphypleona
- Family: Sminthuridae
- Genus: Sminthurus
- Species: S. butcheri

Binomial name
- Sminthurus butcheri Snider, 1969

Synonyms
- Sminthurus spinulosus Snider, 1969

Species of springtail

Sminthurus butcheri is a species of globular springtail in the family Sminthuridae.
