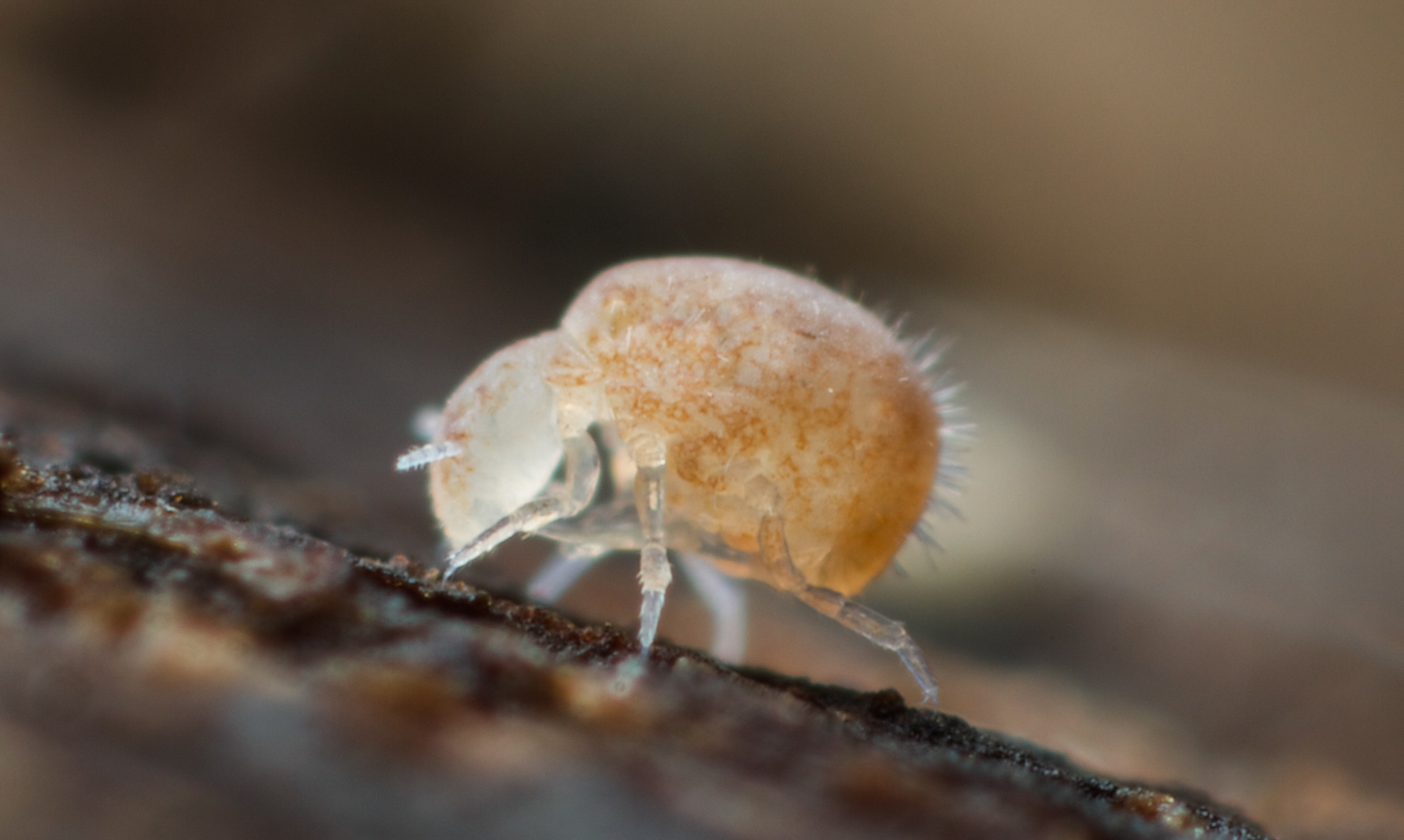
- Neelus murinus

Scientific classification
- Kingdom: Animalia
- Phylum: Arthropoda
- Clade: Pancrustacea
- Class: Collembola
- Order: Neelipleona
- Family: Neelidae
- Genus: Neelus; J.W.Folsom, 1896

= Neelus =

Genus of springtails

Neelus is a genus of springtails within the family Neelidae. Members of this genus can be found in Europe and North America.

== Species ==
- Neelus cvitanovici V. Papác, M. Lukic & L. Kovác, 2016
- Neelus desantisi Najt, 1971
- Neelus fimbriatus Bretfeld & Trinklein, 2000
- Neelus incertoides Mills, 1934
- Neelus incertus (Boener, 1903)
- Neelus klisurensis L. Kovác & V. Papác, 2010
- Neelus koseli L. Kovác & V.Papác, 2010
- Neelus labralisetosus Massoud & Vannier, 1967
- Neelus lackovici V. Papác, M. Lukic & L. Kovác, 2016
- Neelus murinus J. W. Folsom, 1896
- Neelus snideri (Bernard, 1975)
