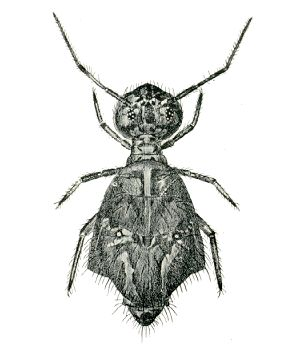
- Sminthurus viridis

Scientific classification
- Kingdom: Animalia
- Phylum: Arthropoda
- Class: Collembola
- Order: Symphypleona
- Family: Sminthuridae
- Subfamily: Sminthurinae
- Genus: Sminthurus; Latreille, 1802

= Sminthurus =

Genus of arthropods

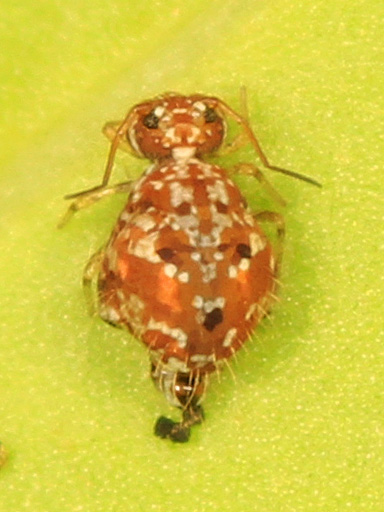
Sminthurus medialis

Sminthurus is a genus of springtails described by Pierre André Latreille in 1802.

== Species ==
These 31 species belong to the genus Sminthurus:

- Sminthurus adirondackus Maynard, 1951^{i c g}
- Sminthurus anomalus Betsch, 1965^{i c g}
- Sminthurus aquaticus Bourlet, 1842^{g}
- Sminthurus argenteornatus Banks, 1899^{i c g}
- Sminthurus banksi Christiansen and Bellinger, 1981^{i c g}
- Sminthurus bivittatus Snider, RJ, 1985^{b}
- Sminthurus bourgeoisi Nayrolles, 1995^{g}
- Sminthurus bozoulensis Nayrolles, 1995^{g}
- Sminthurus butcheri Snider, 1969^{i c g b}
- Sminthurus carolinensis Snider, RJ, 1981^{b}
- Sminthurus coeruleus Strebel, 1938^{g}
- Sminthurus eiseni Schott, 1891^{i c g}
- Sminthurus fischeri Snider, RJ, 1982^{b}
- Sminthurus fitchi Folsom, 1896^{i c g b}
- Sminthurus floridanus MacGillivray, 1893^{i c g}
- Sminthurus hispanicus Nayrolles, 1995^{g}
- Sminthurus hortensis Fitch, 1863^{g}
- Sminthurus incisus Snider, 1978^{i c g b}
- Sminthurus leucomelanus Nayrolles, 1995^{g}
- Sminthurus maculatus Tomosvary, 1883^{g}
- Sminthurus medialis Mills, 1934^{i c g b}
- Sminthurus mencenbergae Snider, RJ, 1983^{b}
- Sminthurus multipunctatus Schäffer, 1896^{g}
- Sminthurus nigrinus Bretfeld, 2000^{g}
- Sminthurus nigromaculatus Tullberg, 1871^{g}
- Sminthurus packardi Folsom, 1896^{i c g}
- Sminthurus purpurescens (Macgillivray, 1894)^{i c g}
- Sminthurus schoetti Salmon, 1964^{i c g}
- Sminthurus sylvestris Banks, 1899^{i c g}
- Sminthurus viridis (Linnaeus, 1758)^{i c g}
- Sminthurus wahlgreni Stach, 1920^{g}

Data sources: i = ITIS, c = Catalogue of Life, g = GBIF, b = BugGuide
