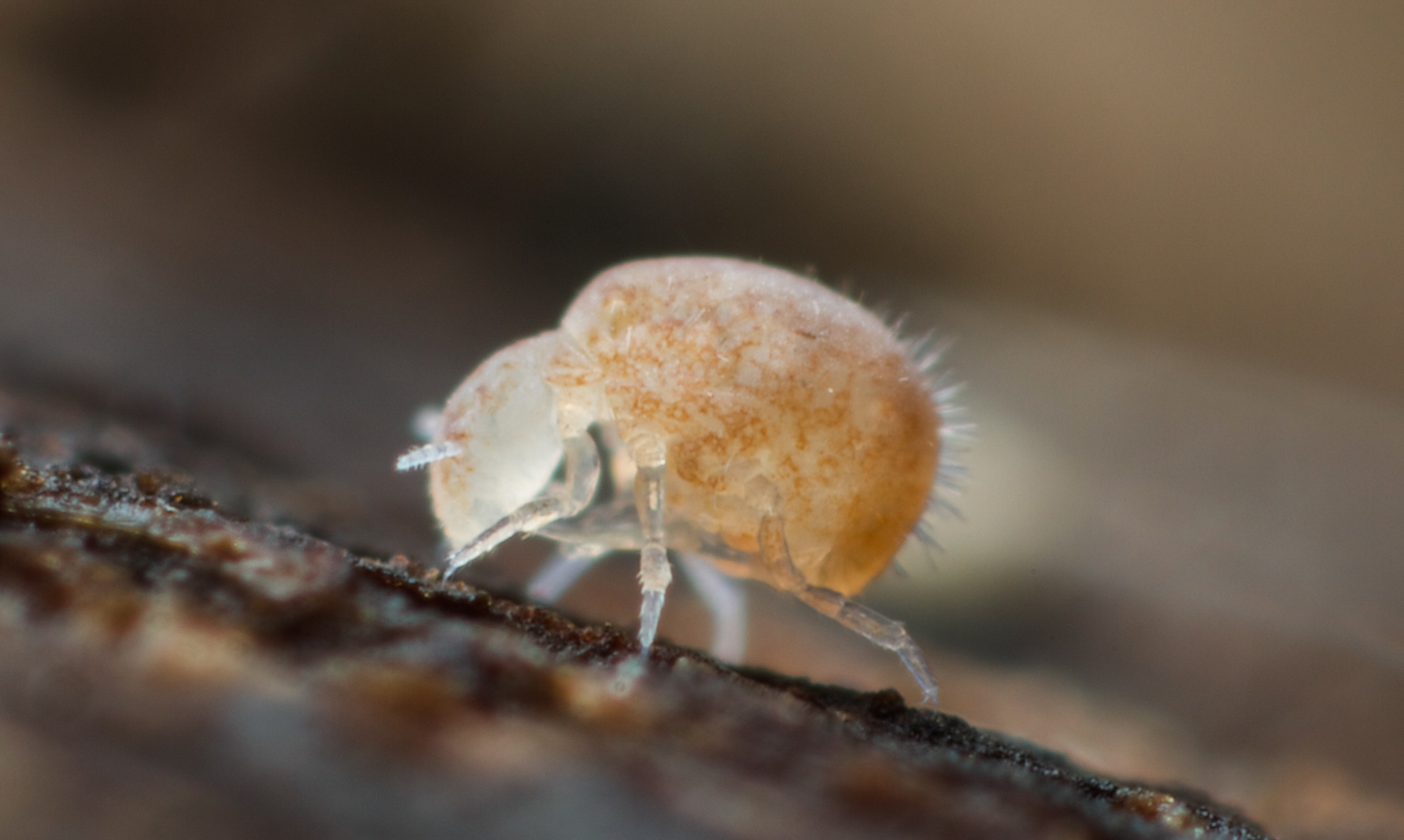

Scientific classification
- Kingdom: Animalia
- Phylum: Arthropoda
- Clade: Pancrustacea
- Class: Collembola
- Order: Neelipleona
- Family: Neelidae
- Genus: Neelus
- Species: N. murinus

Binomial name
- Neelus murinus J.W.Folsom, 1896

= Neelus murinus =

Species of springtail

Neelus murinus is a species of springtail of the family Neelidae described by J.W.Folsom in 1896.
