= Folsomia regularis =

Scientific classification
- Domain: Eukaryota
- Kingdom: Animalia
- Phylum: Arthropoda
- Class: Collembola
- Order: Entomobryomorpha
- Family: Isotomidae
- Genus: Folsomia
- Species: F. regularis

Binomial name
- Folsomia regularis Hammer, 1953

Species of springtail

Folsomia regularis is a species of elongate-bodied springtails in the family Isotomidae.
