= Neosminthurus =

Scientific classification
- Kingdom: Animalia
- Phylum: Arthropoda
- Class: Collembola
- Order: Symphypleona
- Family: Sminthuridae
- Subfamily: Sphyrothecinae
- Genus: Neosminthurus; Mills, 1934

Genus of springtails

Neosminthurus is a genus of globular springtails in the family Sminthuridae, found in Central and North America. There are at least 3 described species in Neosminthurus.

== Species ==
- Neosminthurus bakeri Snider, 1978
- Neosminthurus clavatus (Banks, 1897)
- Neosminthurus richardsi Snider, 1978
