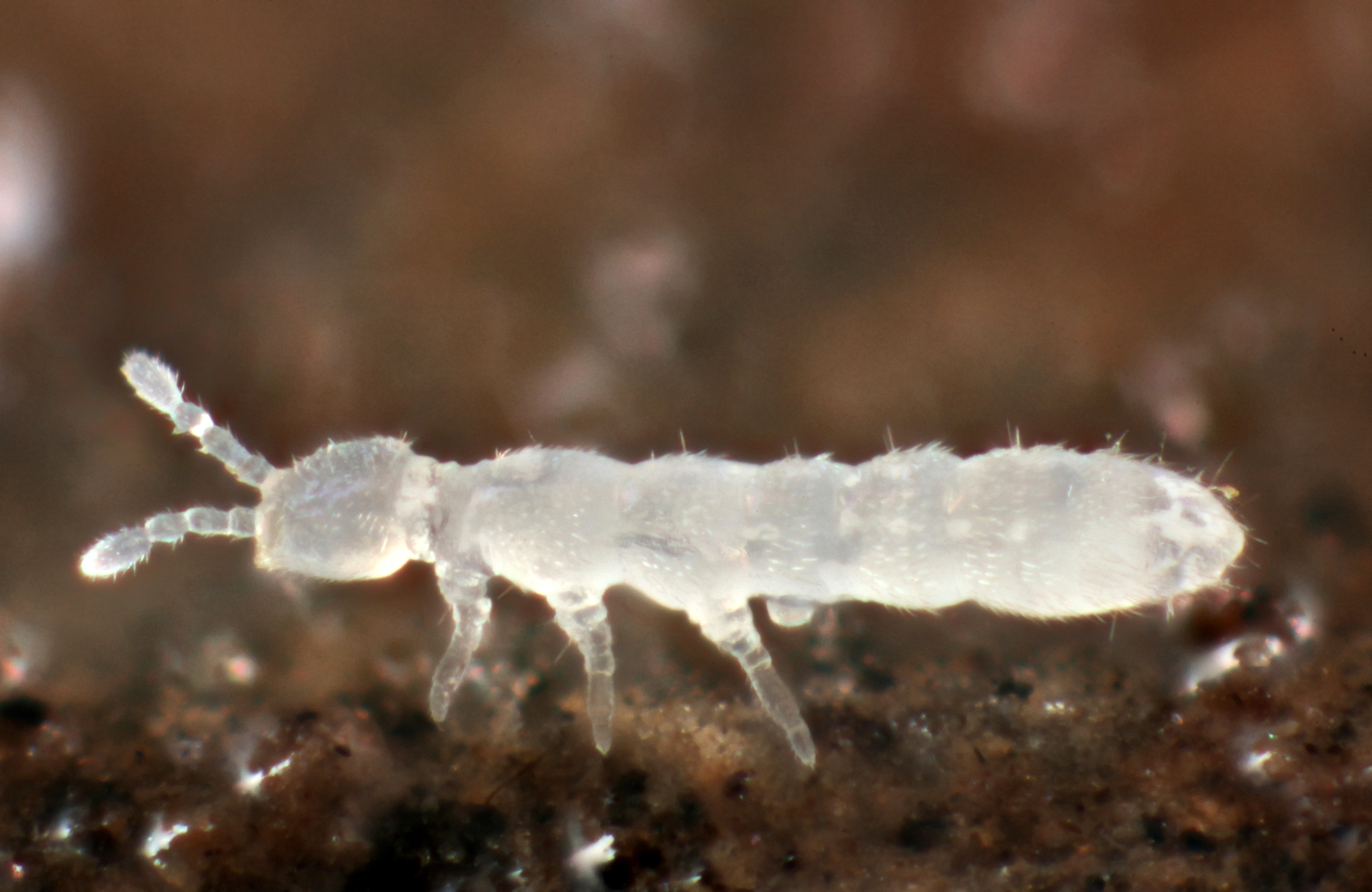

Scientific classification
- Kingdom: Animalia
- Phylum: Arthropoda
- Clade: Pancrustacea
- Class: Collembola
- Order: Entomobryomorpha
- Family: Isotomidae
- Subfamily: Proisotominae
- Genus: Folsomia; Willem, 1902

Diversity
- at least 110 species

Synonyms
- Holotoma Bagnall, 1949

= Folsomia =

Genus of springtails

Folsomia is a genus of elongate-bodied springtails in the family Isotomidae. There are more than 110 species described in the genus Folsomia.

== Species ==
- Folsomia candida
- Folsomia fimetaria
- Folsomia fimetarioides
- Folsomia prima
- Folsomia quadrioculata
- Folsomia regularis
