= Lipothrix =

Scientific classification
- Domain: Eukaryota
- Kingdom: Animalia
- Phylum: Arthropoda
- Class: Collembola
- Order: Symphypleona
- Family: Sminthuridae
- Genus: Lipothrix

Genus of springtails

Lipothrix is a genus of springtails belonging to the family Sminthuridae.

The species of this genus are found in Europe.

Species:

- Lipothrix lubbocki (Tullberg, 1872)
