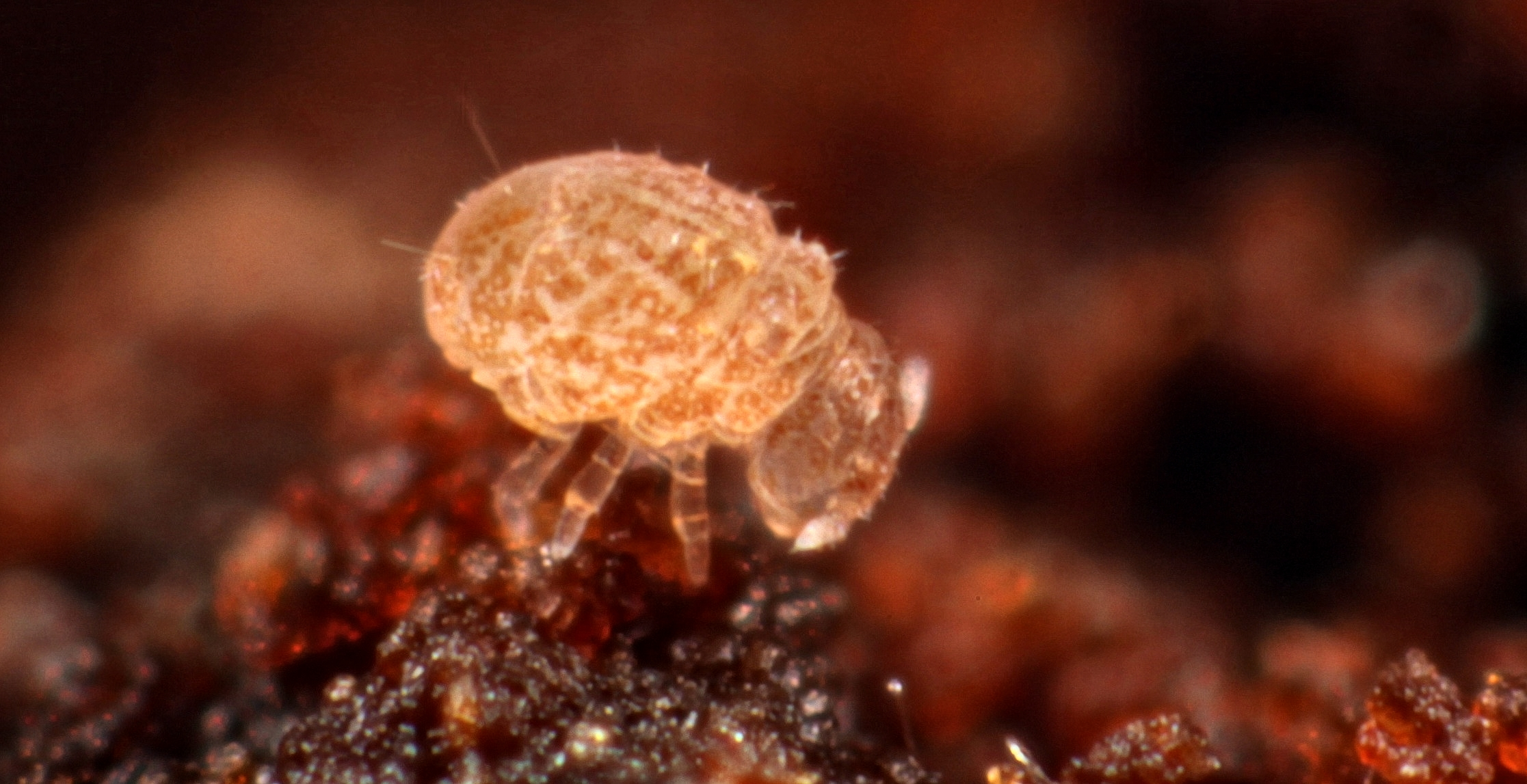

Scientific classification
- Kingdom: Animalia
- Phylum: Arthropoda
- Clade: Pancrustacea
- Class: Collembola
- Order: Neelipleona
- Family: Neelidae
- Genus: Megalothorax; Willem, 1900

= Megalothorax =

Genus of springtails

Megalothorax is a genus of springtails in the family Neelidae. There are about 14 described species in Megalothorax.

== Species ==
These 14 species belong to the genus Megalothorax:

- Megalothorax aquaticus Stach, 1951
- Megalothorax carpaticus
- Megalothorax draco
- Megalothorax granulosus Schneider & D'Haese, 2013
- Megalothorax hipmani
- Megalothorax maculosus Maynard
- Megalothorax massoudi Deharveng, 1978
- Megalothorax minimus Willem, 1900
- Megalothorax nigropunctatus Schneider & D'Haese, 2013
- Megalothorax potapovi Schneider, Porco & Deharveng, 2016
- Megalothorax sanguineus Schneider, Porco & Deharveng, 2016
- Megalothorax svalbardensis Schneider & D'Haese, 2013
- Megalothorax tatrensis
- Megalothorax tuberculatus Deharveng & Beruete, 1993
