= Sphyrotheca =

Scientific classification
- Domain: Eukaryota
- Kingdom: Animalia
- Phylum: Arthropoda
- Class: Collembola
- Order: Symphypleona
- Family: Sminthuridae
- Subfamily: Sphyrothecinae
- Genus: Sphyrotheca; Boener, 1906

Genus of springtails

Sphyrotheca is a genus of globular springtails in the family Sminthuridae. There are seven described species in Sphyrotheca.

== Species ==
These seven species belong to the genus Sphyrotheca:

- Sphyrotheca confusa Snider, 1978^{i c g}
- Sphyrotheca formosana Yosii, 1965^{g}
- Sphyrotheca minnesotensis (Guthrie, 1903)^{i c g b}
- Sphyrotheca mirabilis (Yosii, 1965)^{g}
- Sphyrotheca mucroserrata Snider, 1978^{i c g}
- Sphyrotheca multifasciata (Reuter, 1881)^{i c g}
- Sphyrotheca nani Christiansen and Bellinger, 1992^{i c g}

Data sources: i = ITIS, c = Catalogue of Life, g = GBIF, b = Bugguide.net
