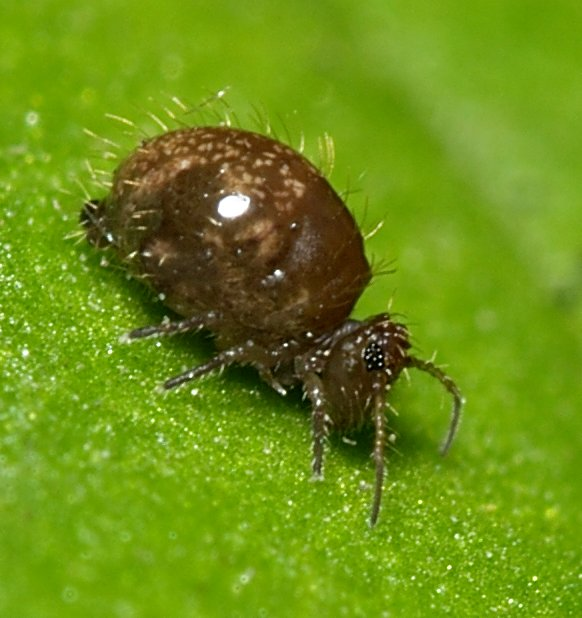
- Allacma fusca

Scientific classification
- Kingdom: Animalia
- Phylum: Arthropoda
- Class: Collembola
- Order: Symphypleona
- Family: Sminthuridae
- Subfamily: Sminthurinae
- Genus: Allacma; Börner, 1906

= Allacma =

Genus of springtails

Allacma is a genus of arthropods belonging to the family Sminthuridae.

The genus was first described by Börner in 1906.

The species of this genus are found in Europe and Northern America.

Selected species:

- Allacma fusca (Linnaeus, 1758)
