= Folsomia prima =

Scientific classification
- Domain: Eukaryota
- Kingdom: Animalia
- Phylum: Arthropoda
- Class: Collembola
- Order: Entomobryomorpha
- Family: Isotomidae
- Genus: Folsomia
- Species: F. prima

Binomial name
- Folsomia prima Mills, 1931

Synonyms
- Folsomia sylvestrii Folsom, 1937

Species of springtail

Folsomia prima is a species of elongate-bodied springtails in the family Isotomidae.
