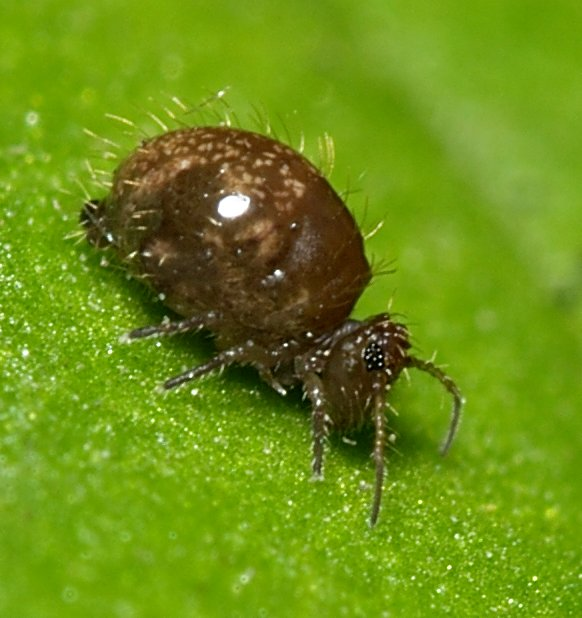
- Allacma fusca on rotting wood

Scientific classification
- Kingdom: Animalia
- Phylum: Arthropoda
- Class: Collembola
- Order: Symphypleona
- Family: Sminthuridae
- Genus: Allacma
- Species: A. fusca

Binomial name
- Allacma fusca (Linnaeus, 1758)

= Allacma fusca =

Species of springtail

Allacma fusca is a species of springtail. This species is endemic to western areas of Continental Europe and the British Isles, where it lives in the surface layers of the soil in moist habitats such as among leaf litter.

== Description ==
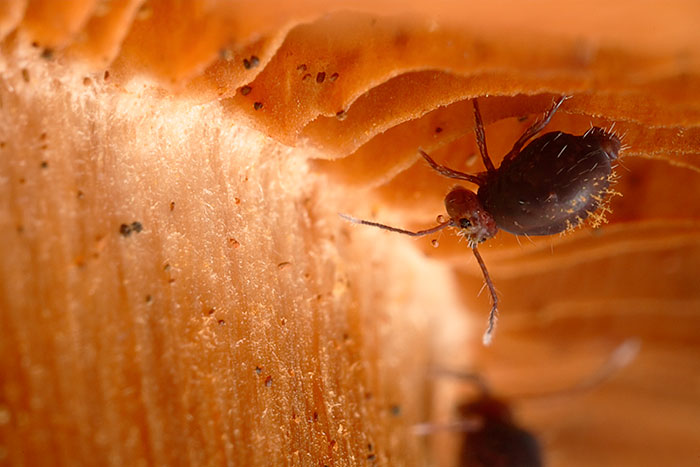
Allacma fusca in Estonia

Allacma fusca is a large species of springtail with a dark brown globular abdomen; adults reach a length of around 3.5 mm (0.14 in). There is often a "snowflake"-like marking on the abdomen, which is most noticeable in paler coloured individuals. The mouthparts are internal, and the head bears a pair of antennae, two groups of eyespots known as "composed eyes" and a pair of small post-antennal organs. The setae (bristles) on the third antennal segment are unequal in length, some being much longer than others, and the fourth antennal segment is divided into sixteen sub-segments. There are three thoracial segments, each bearing a leg, and five abdominal segments. The fourth abdominal segment bears an organ known as a "dens", and at the tip of this is a structure known as a "mucro". This species has mucros with smooth outer edges and saw-edged inner edges. In females, the appendage on the fifth abdominal segment is unforked.

== Distribution and habitat ==
This springtail is native to Western Europe. It is common in the British Isles and inhabits moist terrestrial environments such as plant litter.

== Ecology ==
Invertebrates living among the soil particles in underground habitats often experience raised levels of carbon dioxide, which tends to increase with depth. Researchers have found that the surface-dwelling Allacma fusca can tolerate a 10% level of carbon dioxide for a few hours while in contrast, the springtail Folsomia candida, which lives deeper in the soil, can survive under the same conditions for more than six weeks.
