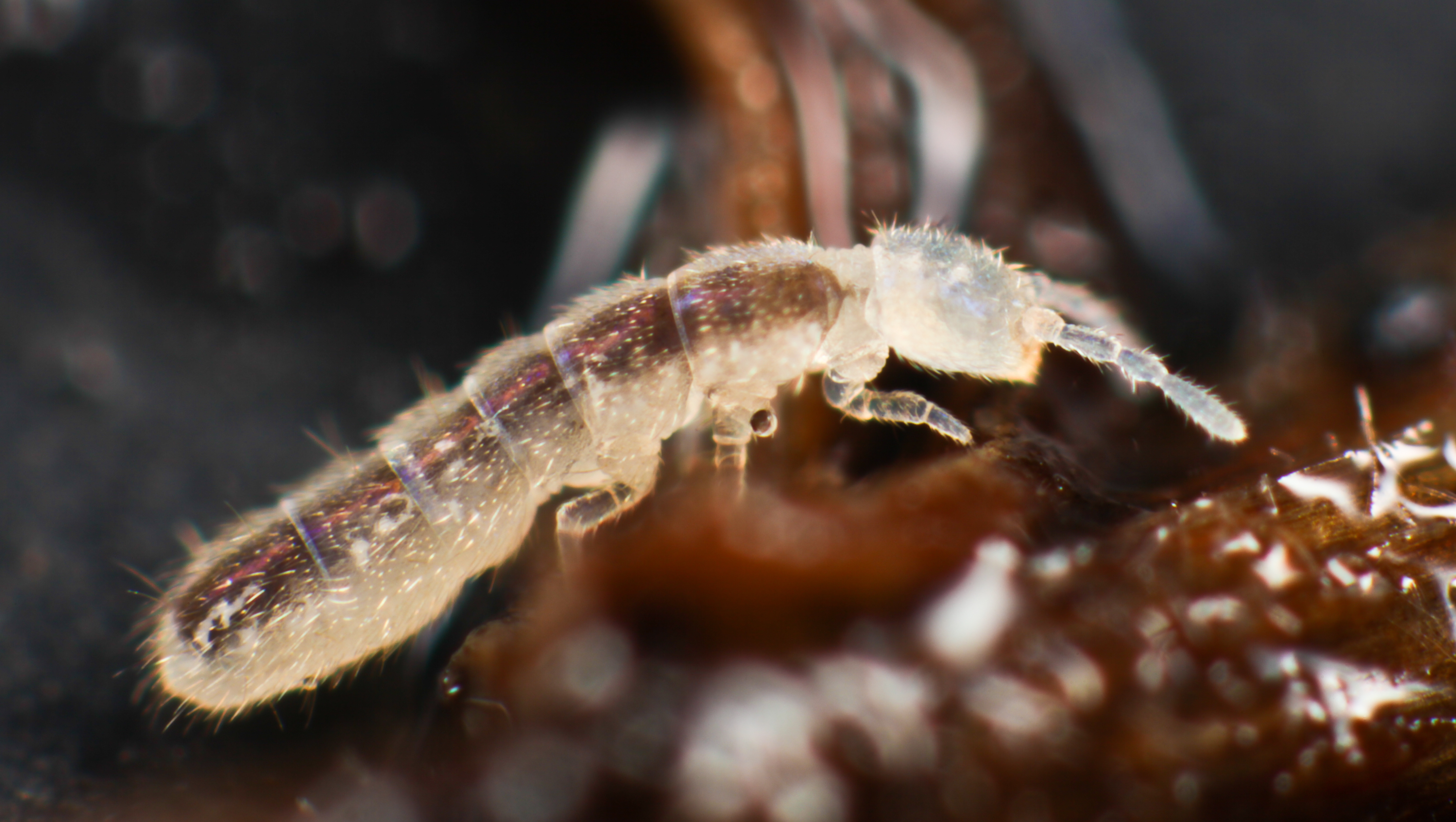

Scientific classification
- Domain: Eukaryota
- Kingdom: Animalia
- Phylum: Arthropoda
- Class: Collembola
- Order: Entomobryomorpha
- Family: Isotomidae
- Genus: Folsomia
- Species: F. candida

Binomial name
- Folsomia candida Willem 1902

= Folsomia candida =

Species of springtail

Folsomia candida is a species of springtail in the family Isotomidae. It is found in soil in many locations around the world, having been spread inadvertently by humans. It reproduces by parthenogenesis and has been used as a model organism in research.

== Description ==
Folsomia candida has an unpigmented, slender body up to 3 mm (0.1 in) in length. The head bears a pair of four-segmented antennae and a pair of post-antennal organs but no eyespots. The dorsal part of the first thoracic segment is reduced and the posterior three abdominal segments are fused. The ventral side of the fourth abdominal segment bears a furca, used in jumping, and it is the number of bristles on this organ that distinguishes this species from others in the genus.

== Distribution and habitat ==
This springtail has been called a "tramp" species as it has spread around the world in soil and in plant pots and its original distribution is unclear. It occurs in mines and caves, and in soils with a high organic content, on farms, in leaf litter in forests and on stream verges.

== Ecology ==
Populations consist only of females, which reproduce by parthenogenesis. The globular white eggs take about one week to hatch at 21 °C (70 °F) and three weeks to reach maturity, having moulted five times. Development takes longer at lower temperatures. Adults continue to moult, doing so about 45 times during their lives, including shedding the lining of the midgut. They may live for 110 to 240 days, depending on the temperature, and each may lay about a thousand eggs. The diet consists mainly of the hyphae of fungi including grazing on root mycorrhizae.

Invertebrates living among the soil particles in underground habitats often experience raised levels of carbon dioxide, which tends to increase with depth. Researchers have found that the surface-dwelling springtail Allacma fusca can tolerate a 10% level of carbon dioxide for a few hours while in contrast, Folsomia candida, which lives deeper in the soil, can survive under the same conditions for more than six weeks.

It is unclear whether springtails in soil are on balance beneficial to crops or disadvantageous. In the case of Folsomia candida, beneficial actions include feeding on plant-pathogenic nematodes and mites.

== Use in research ==
Folsomia candida is easily kept in the laboratory where it can be maintained on granulated baker's yeast. Researchers have developed strains bred from single individuals. It has been used for over forty years to test the effects, on non-target soil invertebrates, of pesticides and soil pollutants. It has also been used as a model organism to investigate many different characteristics including cold tolerance, carbon dioxide tolerance and the effects of its grazing activities on soil fungi and mycorrhizae growing on roots. It has been used to study the processes involved in the decomposition of leaf litter, circadian rhythms, circaseptan (weekly) rhythms, the palatability and nutritious value of different plant residues and species of fungi, the effects on ageing of different environmental conditions, population dynamics and behaviour. Strains have been kept growing in cultures for upwards of five years, and excess individuals can be used as invertebrate food for other organisms kept in the laboratory.
