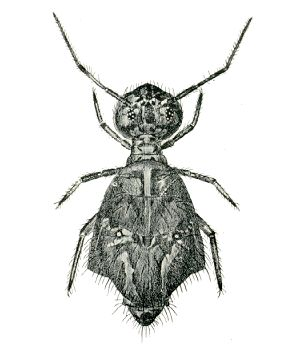

Scientific classification
- Kingdom: Animalia
- Phylum: Arthropoda
- Class: Collembola
- Order: Symphypleona
- Family: Sminthuridae
- Genus: Sminthurus
- Species: S. viridis

Binomial name
- Sminthurus viridis (Linnaeus, 1758)

= Sminthurus viridis =

Species of springtail

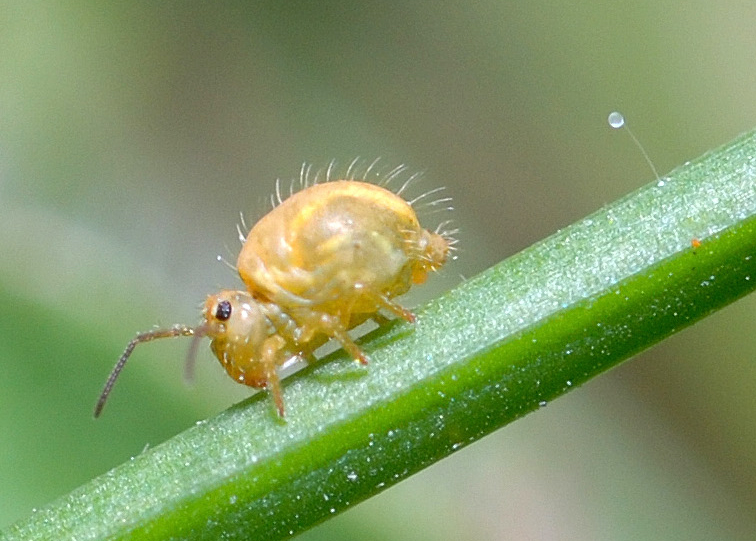
Sminthurus with spermatophore

Sminthurus viridis is a member of the Collembola, the springtails, an order in the subphylum Hexapoda. The species is known by common names such as clover springtail, lucerne flea, or lucerne earth flea.

Common names such as lucerne flea are misleading because, being a member of the Collembola, this species is not even remotely related to the fleas. Calling it a "flea" simply is a reference to its jumping ability and its small size.

The species originated in Eurasia, but in particular in Europe. However, it has been spread unintentionally by human agency. It now is present in southern regions of Australia and Tasmania, where it is considered a pest. It also is present in South Africa, New Zealand, and the Americas. Its pest status varies from negligible to severe, depending on local circumstances.

The human-facilitated dispersal methods that have allowed this species to become so widespread are most commonly the movement of eggs and live young in the transportation of animal feed, seeds, and soil. These methods are how the species initially got introduced to Australia.

== Description ==
Like other members of the family Sminthuridae, S. viridis has a roughly globular body. The species varies in colour, but commonly is patchy bright green or yellowish. As Collembola go, it is a fairly large species, commonly up to about 3 mm in length. The species has a well-developed furcula and it leaps actively if alarmed. The mouthparts of S. viridis are mandibulate, meaning that they have biting mouthparts, though only the tips of the mandibles project out of the mouth folds.

== Biology ==
The mature female lays variable batches of eggs, usually in damp soil or litter. Oviposition is slow; she takes a few minutes to lay each egg. The eggs are very difficult to find in the field because they are covered by sticky excreta containing soil that the female had swallowed. The eggs are spherical, pale yellow, and only about a 1/4 mm in diameter. Their resistance to both drought and cold has enabled the species to survive introduction from cool, moist conditions of Northern Europe, to Australasia and Southern Africa. In conditions of drought, they simply enter a state of aestivation in the form of diapause in which embryonic development is delayed. The delay lasts till a period of soaking rain sets in or until irrigation begins. During a period of active breeding when plenty of moisture exists, the hatching period is variable; under favourable conditions, most eggs hatch in about 2 weeks, but some take 3 weeks or more, while eggs that have aestivated hatch at various intervals over period around a week to a month or more after wet conditions return. When rain is delayed in spring, a bank of partly developed eggs in the soil may accumulate, leading to something of an explosion of emergence after good rain.

Their lifecycles vary with climatic conditions and also with gender; males and female develop according to different schedules. Males are somewhat smaller than females and they undergo ecdysis only four times, after which they are ready for reproductive activity. They produce spermatophores mounted on fine stems well above the substrate surface. A female that encounters such a spermatophore might take it up into her cloaca or simply eat it if she is not receptive. Rival males might eat each other's spermatophores or even their own after they have failed to attract any female and are no longer viable.

The female sheds her skin nine times, but achieves sexual maturity in the sixth instar, that is, after the fifth ecdysis. The earlier instars last for only a matter of days, but the sexually functional instars for a fortnight or so. The fully mature female might live for two months or more. Generations in the field overlap, but roughly four to eight generations a year might occur, depending on the region and conditions.

== Population Genetics ==
S. viridis, due to human dispersal, is found in a wide variety of places, but they do not move between populations much, limiting gene flow between populations. In Australia, different populations were confirmed to be somewhat genetically distinct from one another because of their lack of natural movement. Despite this, they remain as all one species because they still share major genetic similarities.

== Pest status ==
S. viridis often swarms in large numbers on living plants, especially Fabaceae. It commonly occurs on lucerne (an alternative name for alfalfa, hence the first part of the common name). It feeds mainly on the surface cells of leaves, and when it occurs in especially high densities, it causes enough damage to be regarded as an agricultural pest. In this respect, it is unusual among Collembola, because very few members of the suborder do significant harm and some actually are mildly beneficial, either as predators.

The biological control of S. viridis is fairly complex and reasonably effective where it is adequate, because no one agent accounts for the entire control. For instance, fungal infections have been documented as killing the springtails, though they are not seen as major control agents.
