= Permeability =

Permeability, permeable, and semipermeable may refer to:

== Chemistry ==
- Drug permeability
- Semipermeable membrane, a membrane which will allow certain molecules or ions to pass through it by diffusion
- Vascular permeability, the movement of fluids and molecules between the vascular and extravascular compartments
- Permeation of a gas or vapor through a solid substance

== Earth and soil science ==
- Permeability (earth sciences), a measure of the ability of a material (such as rocks) to transmit fluids
  - Relative permeability, in multiphase flow in porous media
- Permeability (foundry sand), a test of the venting characteristics of a rammed foundry sand
- Permeability of soils
  - Hydraulic conductivity, the permeability of soil for water

== Electromagnetism ==
- Permeability (electromagnetism), the degree of magnetization of a material in response to a magnetic field
  - Vacuum permeability, permeability of free space or magnetic constant, a physical constant, the value of magnetic permeability in a classical vacuum

== Vehicles and transport ==
- Permeability (nautical), in ship design, the percentage of empty space in a compartment or tank
- Permeability (spatial and transport planning), the extent to which the layout of urban forms enables people or vehicles to move in different directions

== Other uses ==
- Air permeability, characteristic of textile fabrics, measuring the ease of passage of air through them
- "Impermeable" (song), a song by Ha*Ash
- Permeable Press, an American publishing company
