= Collophore =

Body structure of springtails

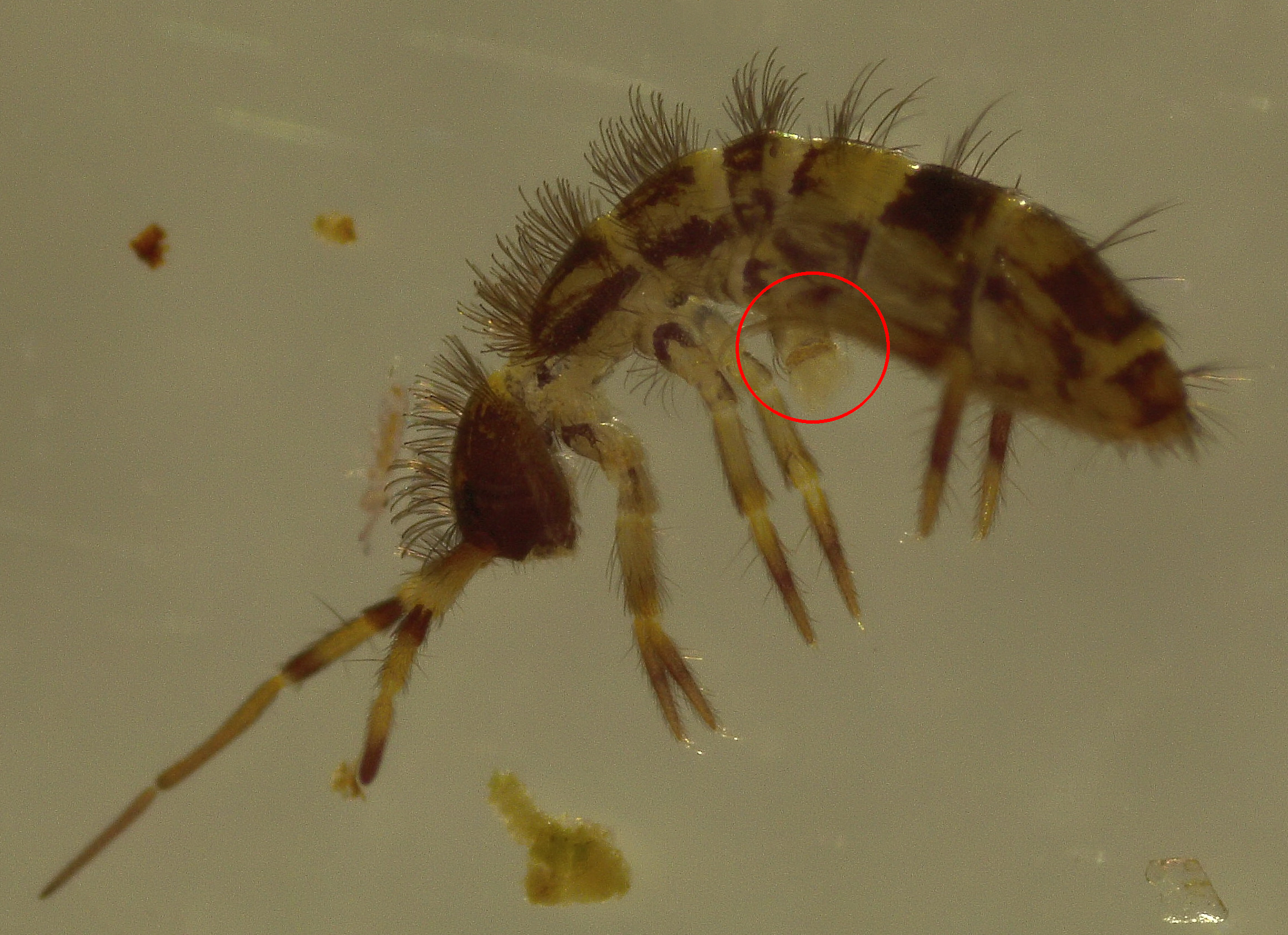
Collophore of Orchesella cincta

A collophore is a tube-like structure on the ventral side of the first abdominal segment of the body of springtails (collembolans). It used to be believed that it served to stabilise the animal when it jumped by sticking to the surface on which it moved. However, the current scientific consensus is that it plays a role in osmoregulation, water intake, and excretion..
