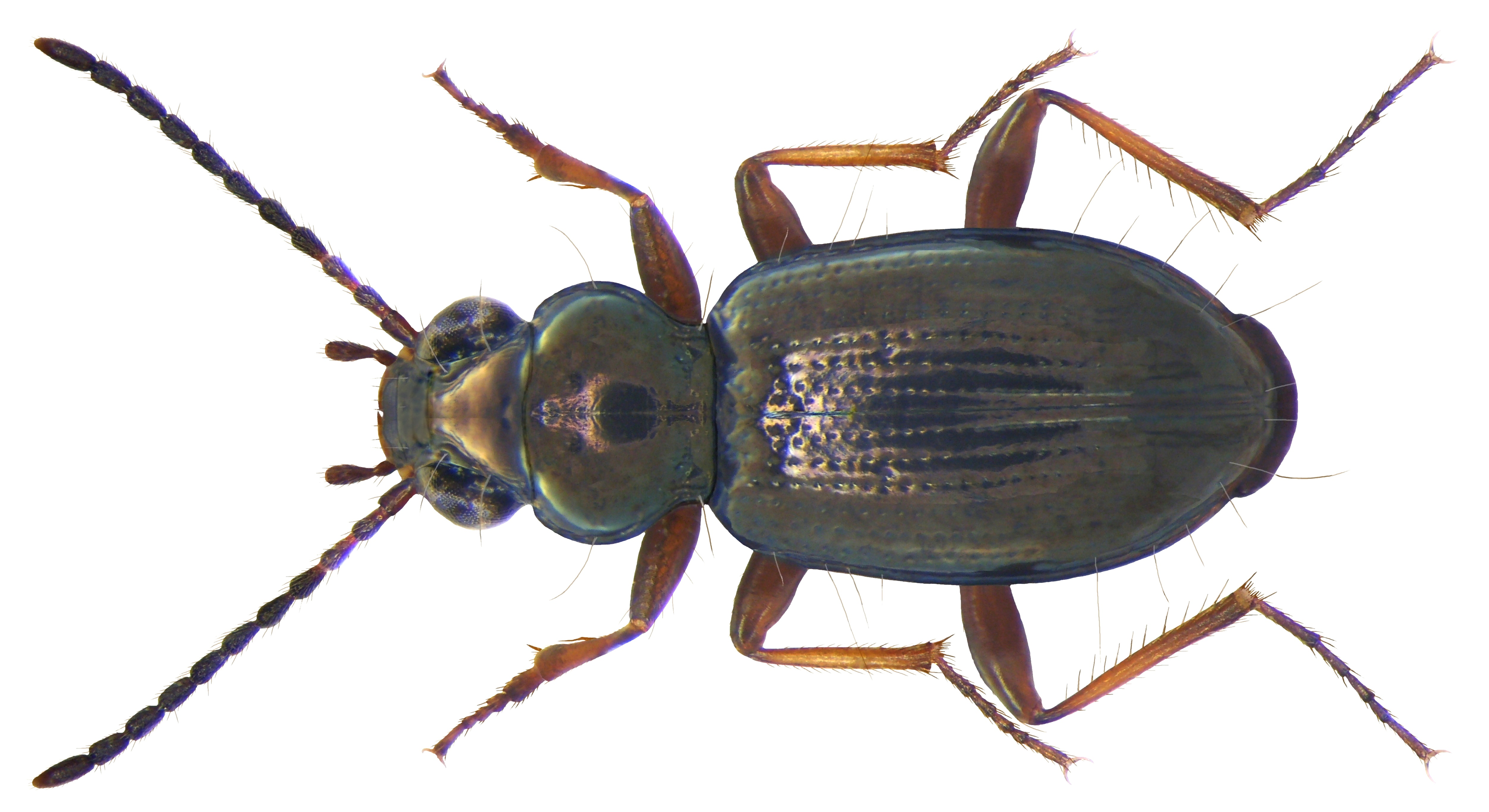

Scientific classification
- Kingdom: Animalia
- Phylum: Arthropoda
- Clade: Pancrustacea
- Class: Insecta
- Order: Coleoptera
- Suborder: Adephaga
- Family: Carabidae
- Genus: Bembidion
- Species: B. lampros

Binomial name
- Bembidion lampros (Herbst, 1784)

= Bembidion lampros =

Species of beetle

Bembidion lampros is a species of ground beetle native to Europe. It is a generalist predator, yet depending on what it consumes their fecundity and larval development time can change.

== Description ==
Bembidion lampros resides within the classification of the order, Coleoptera, and the family, Carabidae. This is evident as this beetle exhibits many distinguishing morphological characteristics such as having the forewings form an elytra which is leathery or hard. Additionally, this elytra meets down the middle of the abdomen in a straight line.

== Habitat preference ==
This beetle is known to thrive on the edge of arable fields in winter, before they move into the center of the fields in early spring to reproduce. An interesting study looked at their movement between different fields of alfalfa and maize under different conditions. It was found that this beetle moved from fields of maize, towards fields of alfalfa, indicating their preference for low crop density, as they prefer to reside on bare ground. Interestingly, in fields of maize, abundance of this beetle is positively correlated with the amount of grassy strips that exist surrounding the maize fields. This is widely suggested to be the case as these grassy boundaries allow for refuge and protection from adverse effects of agricultural activities.

== Behaviour ==
Overall, the Bembidion lampros is found to be rather inactive in colder temperatures when compared to warmer temperatures. A study observing the behaviour of this beetle under natural and experimental conditions has found these beetles to be inactive at temperatures under 9-10 degrees celsius. This is evident as they were unable to catch any in pitfall traps when temperatures dropped below this threshold. An interesting finding is that in the cabbage plots this study used to observe beetles, they were found to prefer to reside on the bare ground, in between plants. It is possible that because of their inactivity in cold temperatures, they seek the space in between plants such that they are not in the shade and can feel the warmth of the sun to maintain internal temperature.

== Morphological adaptations ==
=== Antennal sensilla ===
An interesting adaptation in this beetle is the different types of antennal sensilla which are present on the long filiform antennae, which fulfill diverse purposes, such as olfactory or mechanoreception functions. This beetle's 1.6 to 1.8 mm long antenna may be small, but it contains more than 13 types of antennal sensilla fulfilling a diverse set of functions from olfaction, to chemoreception, as well as mechanoreception. It is also mentioned that the functions of quite a few of these sensilla are yet to be discovered, meaning that they may serve even more functions than currently understood. Both male and female beetles have been shown to exhibit the same antennal sensilla, which help them navigate and gather information from the world around them.

=== Wing dimorphism ===
A study in Newfoundland conducted has discovered that this species of beetle has three different wing phenotypes. Two having short wings, and one having long wings. It is suggested that at least three alleles, or two genes are responsible for the variation in wings, as breeding studies were conducted which indicates that macropterous individuals had macropterous progeny, and brachypterous individuals had progeny with small wings, and mixed parents had mixed offspring. What is interesting is that while there were no flight muscles present in any of the beetles with the short winged phenotype, only 5.9% of individuals with the large wing phenotype had flight muscles. It is predicted that this is due to some genetic factor, rather than flight muscle autolysis, or degeneration. However, it was found that despite the presence of large wings and some having flight muscles, macropterous individuals were not any more responsible for being the primary dispersal agent in this species than brachypterous individuals.

== Reproductive fecundity and survivability during development ==
Bembidion lampros reproduction is univoltine, meaning that only one generation of these beetles are born each year. They prefer to reproduce in arable fields as they are able to feed on cereal aphids. These beetles have low overall lifetime fecundity, as female beetles are only able to lay about 10 eggs in their life. Considering their low lifetime fecundity, the survivability/mortality of developing juveniles is incredibly important for this beetles population dynamics.

When it comes to juvenile survival, it was found that only 34% of beetles in their first instar survived, regardless of soil types. This can be detrimental to populations of this beetle, as less than half of offspring survive the developmental phase.

== Overwintering and early spring survival ==
=== Overwintering survival ===
==== Diapause ====
In order to survive the harsh winters, this beetle undergoes diapause, where they suspend metabolic activities until conditions improve. Interestingly, it was found that the survival of these beetles were higher in harsh winters with constant subzero temperatures compared to temperate winters, and this is due to the fact that in temperate winters, these beetles may die before conditions get cold enough for them to enter diapause to freeze and survive. In harsh winter conditions where they undergo diapause, it is found that they are able to maintain their weight, though this alone is unlikely to explain winter mortality or survivability. Rather, they found that when it comes to harsh winters, food quality may be of utmost importance to survival due to differences in fat reserves due to different diets.

==== The impact of gender, population density, and habitat ====
When it comes to the impact that population density of this beetle has on winter survivability, it was found that higher population densities caused higher percentages of overwinter survival. This is interesting because population density was found to not have any impact on beetle body condition such as weight. Rather, it seems to lead to increased survival as it increased their overall protection against predators that may be present.

It was also found that the location of overwintering impacted the survival. In experimental conditions, beetles who were placed into the center of a field had significantly higher survivability than beetles that were places in the grassy boundary of the field. This is interesting and contrary to expectation, as this beetle typically shows preference for field boundaries compared to field interiors. It is typical for these beetles to overwinter in the grassy edges of the field, before moving into the field center in spring where their reproduction occurs.

Gender also had an effect on overwintering in these beetles, but not on survival as expected. Rather, it was found that female beetles body conditions compared to males after overwintering. Additionally, in a starvation experiment they conducted, they had found that female beetles were able to live on average ten days longer than the males. The reason for female beetles superior body condition following overwintering and their superior survivability against starvation has been attributed to their large size. It is stated that larger individuals are more efficient in their energy usage, and this would explain why starved females were able to survive for longer in the starvation experiments.

=== Early spring survival ===
These beetles are able to survive incredibly long when dealing with starvation. When fed consistently, they had a fat content of about 23%, and only die to starvation weeks later when their fat content drops to 7%. Based on these findings, and how beetles lose very little weight during diapause, it is concluded that these beetles do not suffer from high mortality due to food shortage in early spring.

== Role in pest control ==
Bembidion lampros is incredibly beneficial when it comes to agricultural production, as they are predators to pest species. To be specific, this beetle is integral in controlling and decreasing the high aphid populations which are known to cause large amounts of damage to agricultural fields. This is likely because this beetle is one of the first species to move in the spring, which allows them to be more effective in aphid pest control as opposed to late moving species of beetles. When it comes to the efficacy of using these beetles for pest control, a study indicated that these beetles use hedgerows as preferred dispersal routes. With this in mind, it is possible to utilize the beetles preferred path of dispersal to fully reap the benefits of this incredibly important species ability to control pests.
