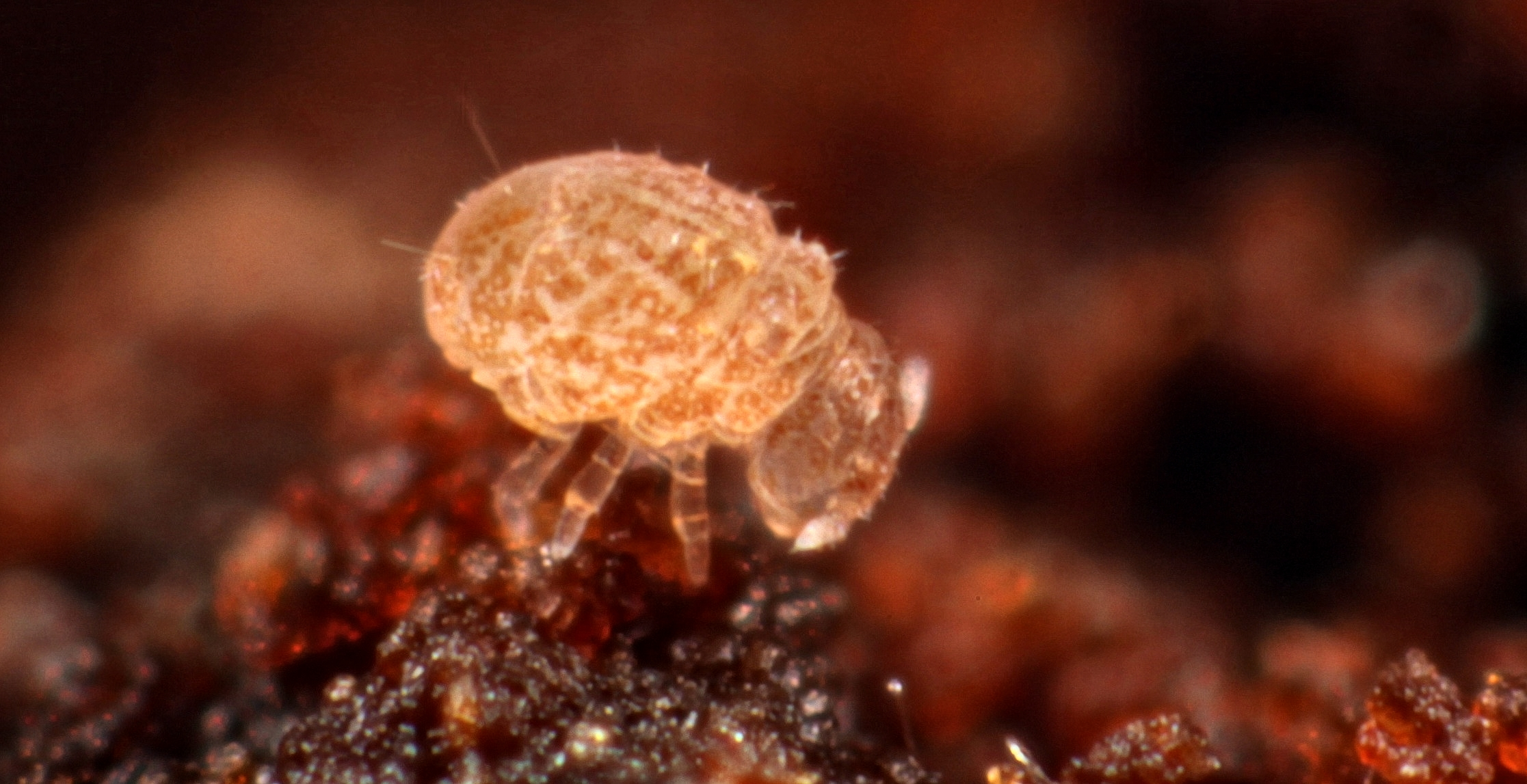
- Megalothorax

Scientific classification
- Kingdom: Animalia
- Phylum: Arthropoda
- Clade: Pancrustacea
- Class: Collembola
- Order: Neelipleona
- Family: Neelidae

= Neelidae =

Family of springtails

Neelidae is a family of springtails in the order Neelipleona. There are at least 4 genera and more than 30 described species in Neelidae.

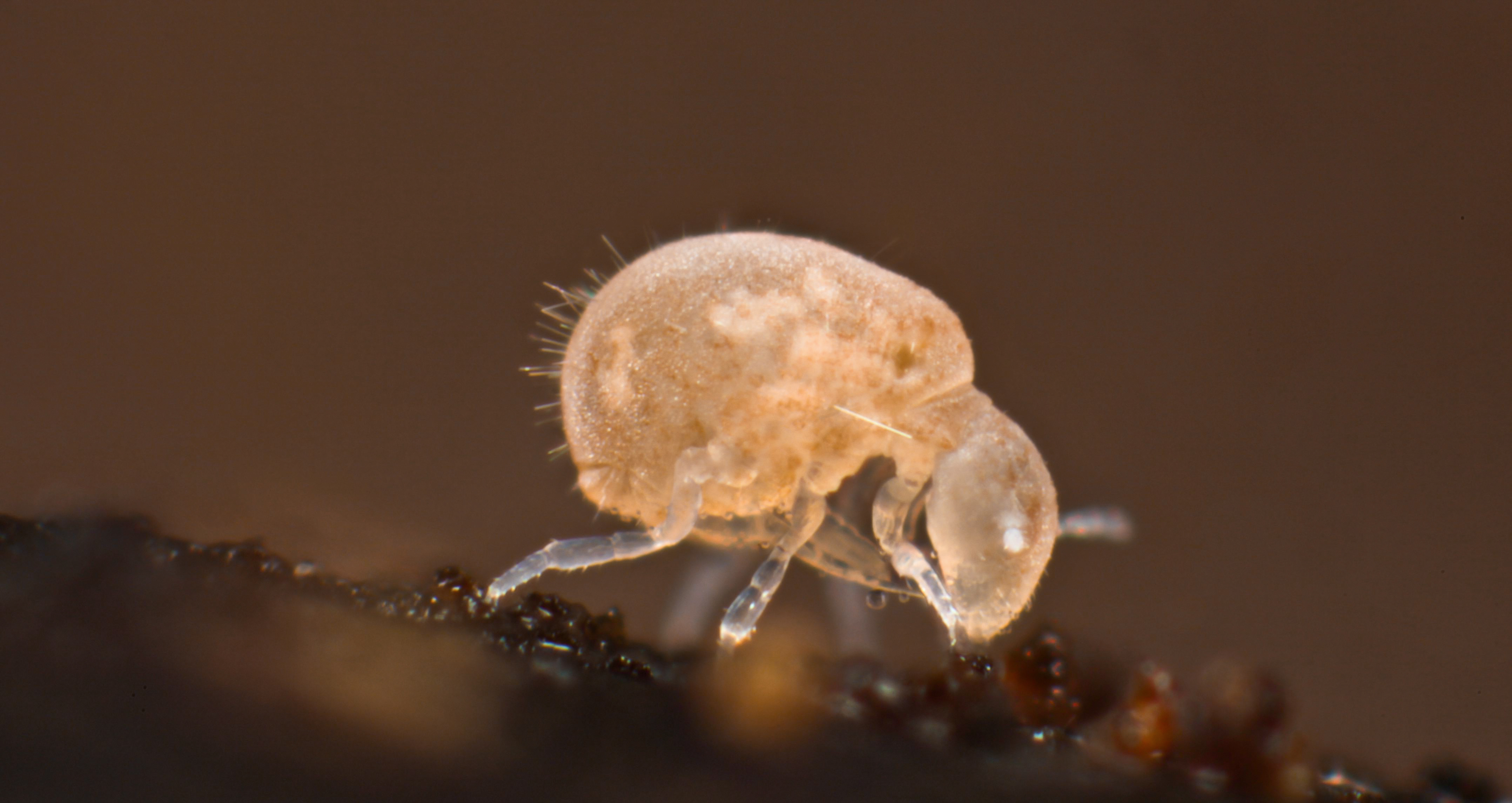
Neelus murinus

== Genera ==
These four genera belong to the family Neelidae:

- Megalothorax Willem, 1900
- Neelides Caroli, 1912
- Neelus Folsom, 1896
- Zelandothorax Delamare Debouteville & Massoud, 1963

== Description ==
Members of the family Neelidae are generally minute, averaging around 500 μm. They possess globular bodies superficially like that of the Symphypleona, with relatively long legs and a well-developed furca compared to other soil-dwelling springtails.

== Phylogeny ==
Neelidae was initially considered to have a close affinity with Symphypleona, based on morphological characteristics shared between the two groups such as a globular shape, neosminthuroid setae and others. However, molecular data places them as a basal group to all other Collembola.
