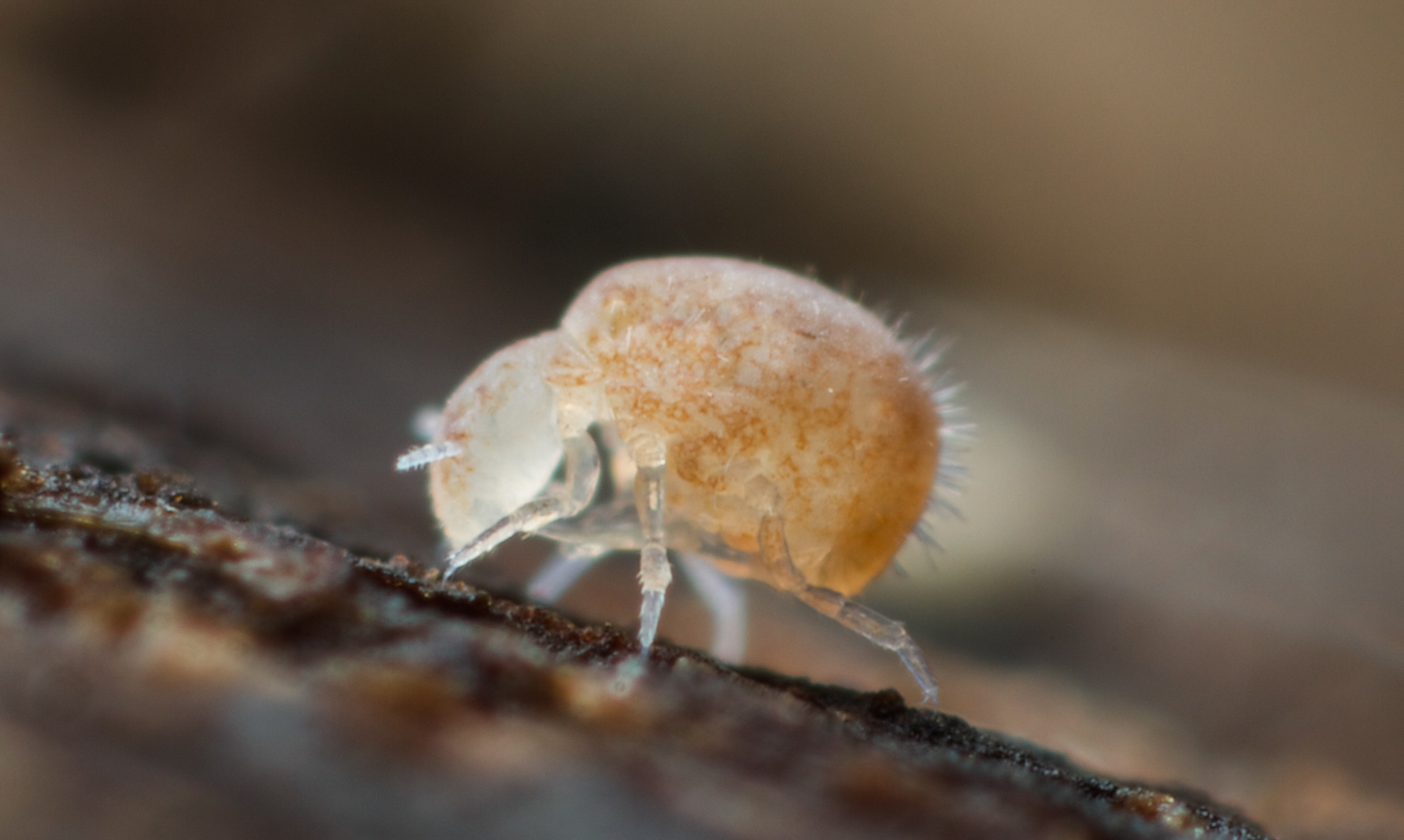
- A picture of Neelus murinus (Neelipleona) taken in Launceston, Tasmania.

Scientific classification (disputed)
- Kingdom: Animalia
- Phylum: Arthropoda
- Clade: Pancrustacea
- Class: Collembola
- Order: Neelipleona

= Neelipleona =

Subclass of springtails

Neelipleona is a name given to some hexapods of the subclass Collembola (springtails). While their taxonomic rank remains broadly settled as family Neelidae, Neelipleona has been described at order or suborder rank. Eyes are absent.

== Taxonomic rank ==
Many authors consider the "Neelipleona" Symphypleona of the superfamily Sminthuroidea, family Neelidae.

However, in other accounts, Neelipleona are either a distinct order from the three less controversial Springtail orders (Entomobryomorpha, Poduromorpha and Symphypleona) or a distinct suborder of Symphypleona, or placed in the Entomobryomorpha.
