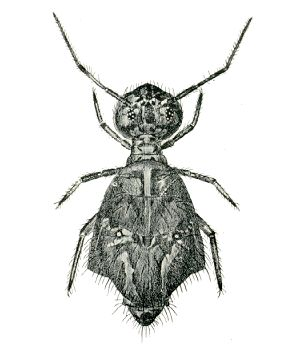
- Sminthurus viridis, about 3 mm long, is also known as the lucerne flea

Scientific classification
- Kingdom: Animalia
- Phylum: Arthropoda
- Clade: Pancrustacea
- Class: Collembola
- Order: Symphypleona
- Superfamily: Sminthuroidea
- Family: Sminthuridae

Genera
- See text

= Sminthuridae =

Family of springtails

Sminthuridae (Lubbock, 1862) is a family of springtails of the order Symphypleona. Sminthurids are commonly referred to as globular springtails.

== Description ==
Like other Symphypleona, Sminthuridae are globular in shape and have a furcula that allows them to backflip the fastest of any animal. Members of this family have four-segmented antennae in which the basal segment is short and the rest successively increase in length. The terminal antennal segment has about 20 whorls of hairs and is divided into numerous subsegments. Sminthuridae also have well-developed tracheae. The dens has many setae, unlike in Mackenziellidae where it has 3 setae. Females have subanal appendages.

== Ecology ==
Sminthuridae occur in surface litter layers, on vegetation and in tropical forest canopies. They may be collected using Tullgren funnels or pitfall traps, or by sweeping through grass with a pan. Additionally, Sminthuridae is one of the springtail families that includes species living in freshwater.

== List of genera ==
Thirteen genera are placed within the Sminthuridae:

- Allacma Borner, 1906
- Arrhopalites Borner, 1906
- Bourletiella Banks, 1899
- Caprainea Dallai, 1970
- Collophora Richards, 1964
- Dicyrtoma Bourlet, 1842
- Lipothrix Borner, 1906
- Neosminthurus Mills, 1934
- Ptenothrix Borner, 1906
- Sminthurus Latreille, 1802
- Spatulosminthurus Betsch & Betsch-Pinot, 1983
- Sphyrotheca Borner, 1906
- Vesicephalus Richards, 1964

== Notable species ==
- Allacma fusca, a common European species
- Sminthurus viridis, the lucerne flea, an introduced pest species in Australia
