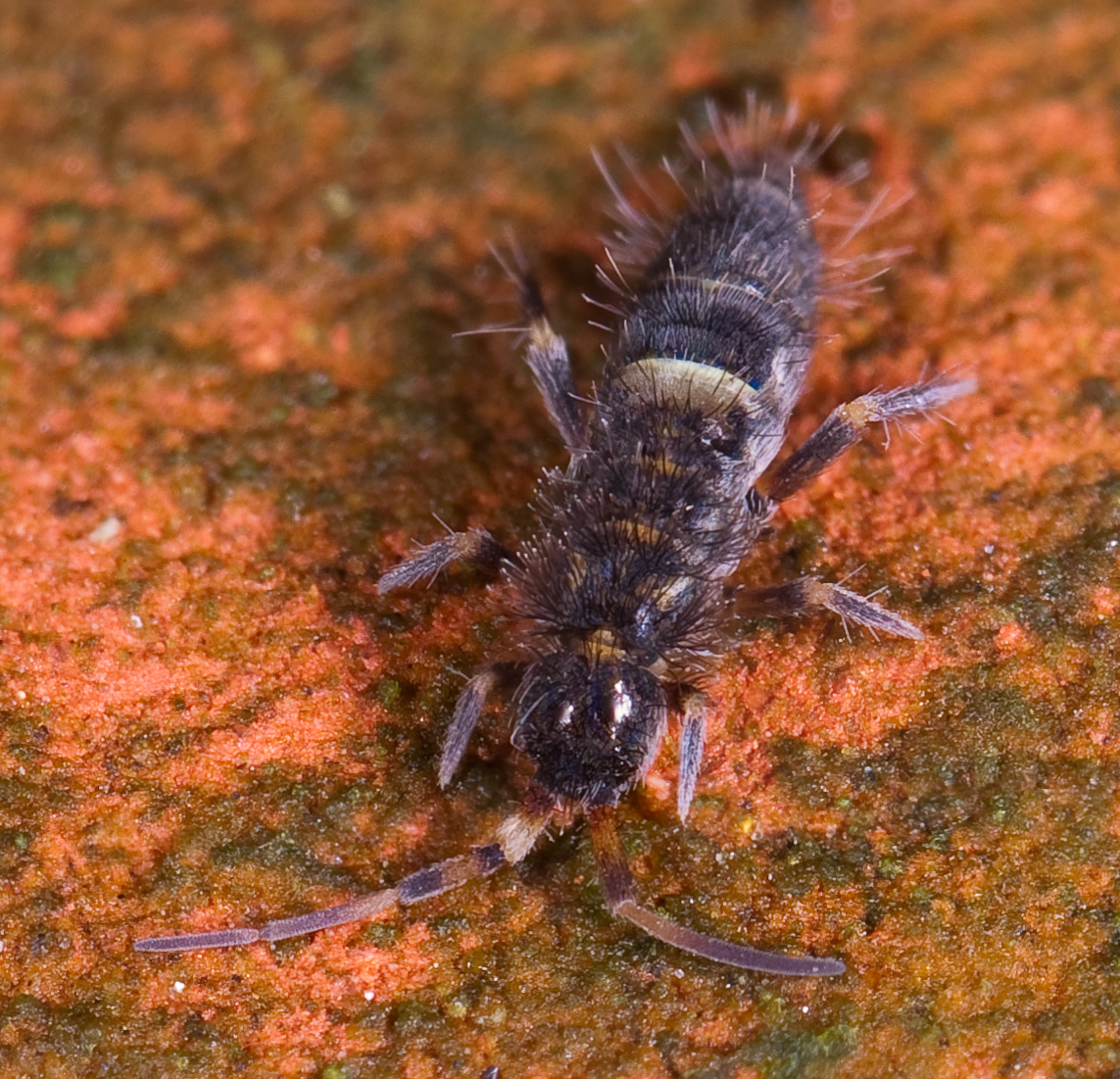
- Orchesella cincta

Scientific classification
- Kingdom: Animalia
- Phylum: Arthropoda
- Clade: Pancrustacea
- Clade: Allotriocarida
- Subphylum: Hexapoda
- Class: Collembola; Lubbock, 1871

Orders
- Entomobryomorpha; Poduromorpha; Symphypleona; Neelipleona (disputed)

Synonyms
- Oligentoma; Oligoentoma

= Springtail =

Springtail Temporal range: Early Devonian – present

Class of hexapods

Springtails (class Collembola) form the largest of the three lineages of modern hexapods that are no longer considered insects, the others being Protura and Diplura. Although the three lineages are sometimes grouped together in Entognatha because they have internal mouthparts, they do not appear to be any more closely related to one another than they are to insects, which have external mouthparts. There are more than 9,000 species worldwide.

Springtails are omnivorous, free-living organisms that prefer moist conditions. They do not directly engage in the decomposition of organic matter, but contribute to it indirectly through the fragmentation of organic matter and the control of soil microbial communities. The word Collembola is from the Ancient Greek κόλλα kólla meaning 'glue' and ἔμβολος émbolos meaning 'peg'; this name was given due to the existence of the collophore, which was previously thought to stick to surfaces to stabilize the creature.

Early DNA sequence studies suggested that Collembola represent a separate evolutionary line from the other Hexapoda, but others disagreed. This seemed to be caused by widely divergent patterns of molecular evolution among the arthropods. The adjustments of traditional taxonomic rank for springtails reflect the occasional incompatibility of traditional groupings with modern cladistics: when they were included with the insects, they were ranked as an order; as part of the Entognatha, they are ranked as a subclass. If they are considered within Hexapoda, they are elevated to full class status.

== Morphology ==
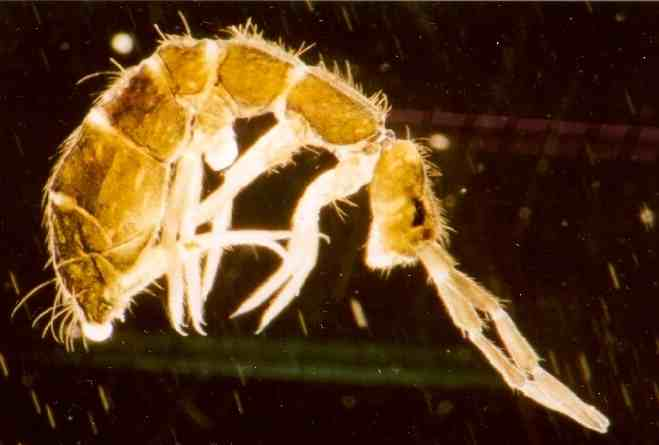
Isotoma anglicana (Entomobryomorpha) with visible furcula

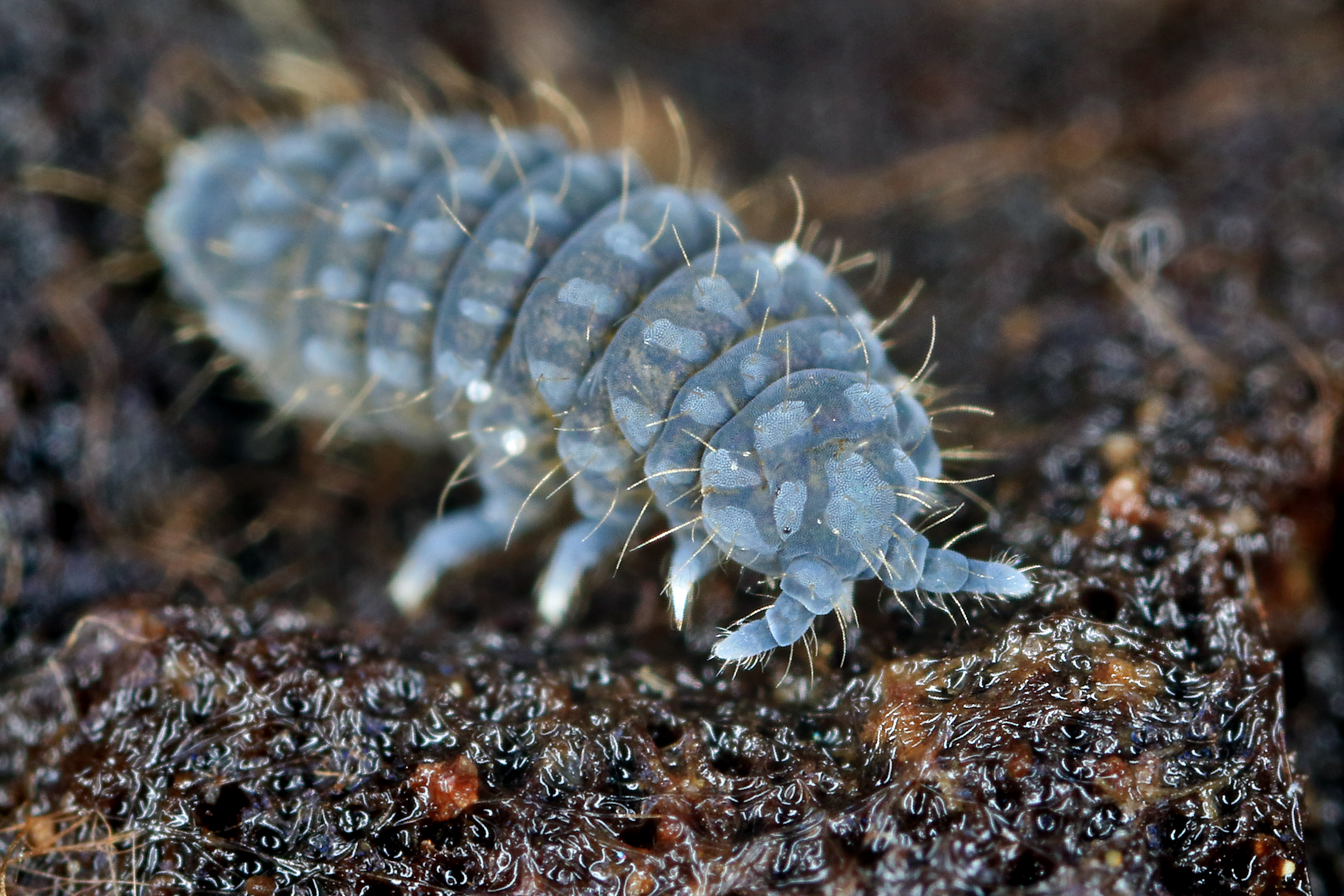
Deutonura monticola (Poduromorpha)

Members of the Collembola are normally less than 6 mm (0.24 in) long, have six or fewer abdominal segments, and possess a tubular appendage (the collophore or ventral tube) with reversible, sticky vesicles, projecting ventrally from the first abdominal segment. It is believed to serve various functions, e.g. fastening the body on a smooth surface, fluid uptake and excretion, cleaning the body surface, and orientation of the organism itself during jump. Most species have an abdominal, tail-like appendage known as a furcula (or furca). It is located on the ventral side of the fourth abdominal segment and is folded beneath the body, held under tension by a small structure called the retinaculum (or tenaculum). When released, it snaps against the substrate, flinging the springtail into the air and allowing for rapid evasion and travel, all of this taking place in a few milliseconds.

Springtails also possess the ability to reduce their body size by as much as 30% through subsequent ecdyses (moulting) if temperatures rise high enough. The shrinkage is genetically controlled. Since warmer conditions increase metabolic rates and energy requirements (and thus expenditure) in organisms, the reduction in body size is advantageous to their survival. Reduction in body size occurs also under other environmental stresses such as soil contamination.

The Poduromorpha and Entomobryomorpha have an elongated body, while the Symphypleona and Neelipleona have a globular body. Collembola lack a tracheal respiration system, which forces them to respire through a porous cuticle, except for the two families Sminthuridae and Actaletidae, which exhibit a single pair of spiracles between the head and the thorax, leading to a rudimentary, although fully functional, tracheal system. The anatomical variance (life-form variation) present between different species partially depends on their vertical distribution across the various strata of terrestrial ecosystems. Surface-dwellers are generally larger, have darker pigments, longer antennae and a functioning furcula. Sub-surface-dwellers are usually unpigmented, have elongated bodies, and reduced furcula. They can be categorized into four main forms according to vertical distribution: atmobiotic, epedaphic, hemiedaphic, and euedaphic. Atmobiotic species inhabit vegetation and litter surface. They are generally 8-10 millimeters (about ⅓ in) in length, pigmented, have long limbs, and a full set of ocelli (photoreceptors). Epedaphic species inhabit upper litter layers and fallen logs. They are slightly smaller and have less pronounced pigments, as well as less developed limbs and ocelli than the atmobiotic species. Hemiedaphic species inhabit the lower litter layers of decomposing organic material. They are 1-2 millimeters (about 1/16 in) in length, have dispersed pigmentation, shortened limbs, and a reduced number of ocelli. Euedaphic species inhabit upper mineral layers known as the humus horizon (or humipedon). They are smaller than hemiedaphic species; have soft, elongated bodies; lack pigmentation and ocelli; and have reduced or absent furca.

Poduromorphs are characterized by their elongated bodies and conspicuous segmentation: they have three thoracic segments, six abdominal segments, including a well-developed prothorax with tergal chaetae, while the first thoracic segment in Entomobryomorpha is clearly reduced and bears no chaetae.

The digestive tract of springtails consists of three main components: foregut, midgut, and hindgut. The midgut is surrounded by a network of muscles and lined with a monolayer of columnar or cuboidal cells. Its function is to mix and transport food from the lumen into the hindgut through contraction. Many species of syntrophic bacteria, archaea, and fungi are present in the lumen, forming the collembolan gut microbiome. These different digestive regions have varying pH to support specific enzymatic activities and microbial populations. The anterior portion of the midgut and hindgut is slightly acidic (with a pH of approximately 6.0) while the posterior midgut portion is slightly alkaline (with a pH of approximately 8.0). Between the midgut and hindgut is an alimentary canal called the pyloric region, which is a muscular sphincter. Malpighian tubules are absent, excretion and osmoregulation being ensured by eversible vesicles of the collophore.

Sensory organs are made of tactile hairs and sensilla, which are mostly distributed on the dorsal side of head, thorax and abdomen and on legs, and chemoreceptory vesicles which are mostly (but not only) distributed on antennae. To the exception of blind species (mostly subterranean) Collembola are equipped with visual areas (currently called eyes), consisting of a number of ocella, varying from one to eight, disposed on both sides of the head. Most collembolan species living in soil and litter escape light (negative phototaxis) while some species are on the contrary attracted to it (positive phototaxis) and may use polarized light for their directional movements (polarotaxis) to targetted places (e.g. water).

== Genomics ==
Given their small size, springtails have been neglected in terms of genome analysis. They are one of the few arthropod groups that do not have high-quality reference genomes. Even though some earlier genome sequences were produced, they do not meet modern standards (contig N50 > 1 MB). One of the first genomes was presented in 2025, that of Orchesella flavescens, which is 270 MB and was assembled into 6 chromosome-level scaffolds.

== Systematics and evolution ==
Allacma fusca (Symphypleona) on rotting wood

Traditionally, springtails were divided into the orders Arthropleona, Symphypleona, and occasionally also Neelipleona. The Arthropleona were divided into two superfamilies, the Entomobryoidea and the Poduroidea. However, molecular-based phylogenetic studies show Arthropleona is paraphyletic. Thus, the Arthropleona are abolished in modern classifications, and their superfamilies are raised in rank accordingly, being now orders Entomobryomorpha and the Poduromorpha. Technically, the Arthropleona are thus a partial junior synonym of the Collembola.

The term Neopleona is essentially synonymous with Symphypleona + Neelipleona. The Neelipleona was originally seen as a particularly advanced lineage of Symphypleona, based on the shared global body shape, but the global body of the Neelipleona is realized in a completely different way than in Symphypleona. Subsequently, the Neelipleona were considered as being derived from the Entomobryomorpha. Analysis of 18S and 28S rRNA sequence data, though, suggests that they form the most ancient lineage of springtails, which would explain their peculiar apomorphies. This phylogenetic relationship was also confirmed using a phylogeny based on mtDNA and whole-genome data.

The latest whole-genome phylogeny supporting four orders of Collembola:

- - Neelipleona
  - - Poduromorpha
    - - Symphypleona
      - Entomobryomorpha

Springtails are attested to since the Early Devonian. The fossil from 400 million years ago, Rhyniella praecursor, has long been considered as the oldest terrestrial arthropod until arachnid and millipede fossils were found in Silurian deposits, and it was found in the famous Rhynie chert of Scotland. Given its morphology resembles extant species quite closely, the radiation of the Hexapoda can be situated in the Silurian, 420 million years ago or more.

Fossil Collembola are rare. Instead, most are found in amber. Even these are rare and many amber deposits carry few or no Collembola. The best deposits are from the early Eocene of Canada and Europe, Miocene of Central America, and the mid-Cretaceous of Burma and Canada. They display some unexplained characteristics: first, all but one of the fossils from the Cretaceous belong to extinct genera, whereas none of the specimens from the Eocene or the Miocene are of extinct genera; second, the Cretaceous species from Burma are more similar to the modern fauna of Canada than are the Canadian Cretaceous specimens.

There are now about 9,600 described species of Collembola. However, to the light of ongoing developments in molecular methods and the rise of cryptic species unveiled by DNA barcoding within morphologically-described species, it has been speculated that the global species richness of Collembola could be at least an order of magnitude greater than a previous estimate of 50,000 species.

== Ecology ==
=== Foraging ===
Specific feeding (foraging) strategies and mechanisms are employed to match specific niches. Herbivorous and detritivorous species fragment biological material present in soil and leaf litter, supporting decomposition and increasing the availability of nutrients for plants and various species of microbes and fungi. Carnivorous species maintain populations of small invertebrates such as nematodes, rotifers, and other collembolan species. Springtails commonly consume fungal hyphae and spores, but also have been found to consume plant material and pollen, animal remains, colloidal materials, minerals and bacteria. Streptomyces actinobacteria produce geosmin which attracts some species of springtails which feed on and spread their spores. Some springtail species like Anurophorus laricis can form mutually beneficial relationships with lichens, using them for shelter while feeding on surrounding free-living algae, which helps reduce competition between algae and lichens for space and nutrients. For finding their preferred food in light-free and complex environments like litter and soil layers Collembola use olfactory cues such as the odors emitted by fungi and other food sources as attractors. Directional movement towards the food source has been recorded by image analysis in laboratory experiments. However, other experiments showed that attraction and consumption were often, but not always correlated, and that preferred fungal strains were not necessarily those that optimize performances in reproduction (fitness), growth and survival.

=== Predators ===
Springtails are consumed by mesostigmatan mites in various families, including Ascidae, Laelapidae, Parasitidae, Rhodacaridae and Veigaiidae. Cave-dwelling springtails are a food source for spiders and harvestmen in the same environment, such as the endangered harvestman Texella reyesi. Predators also include various soil centipedes.

Jumping, using the furcula as a spring, is the most common way to avoid predation, but jump escape cannot be performed easily in concealed environments such as litter, and more especially soil layers. To protect themselves against predators, some species without jumping abilities have evolved chemical defenses.

=== Distribution ===
Springtails are cryptozoa frequently found in leaf litter and other decaying material, where they are primarily detritivores and microbivores, and one of the main biological agents responsible for the control and the dissemination of soil microorganisms. In a mature deciduous woodland in temperate climate, leaf litter and vegetation typically support 30 to 40 species of springtails, and in the tropics the number may be over 100.

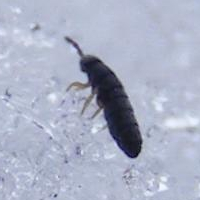
"Snow flea"

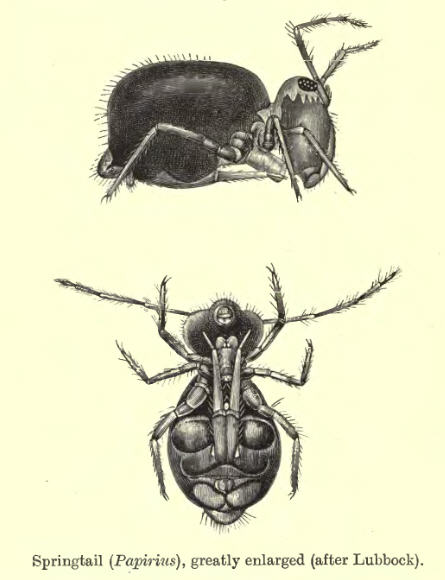
A species of Sminthurinae (Symphypleona: Sminthuridae)

In sheer numbers, they are reputed to be one of the most abundant of all macroscopic animals, with estimates of 100,000 individuals per square meter of ground, essentially everywhere on Earth where soil and related habitats (e.g. moss cushions, fallen wood, grass tufts, ant and termite nests) occur. Only nematodes, crustaceans, and mites are likely to have global populations of similar magnitude, and each of those groups except mites is more inclusive. Though taxonomic rank cannot be used for absolute comparisons, it is notable that nematodes are a phylum and crustaceans a subphylum. Most springtails are small and difficult to see by casual observation, but some springtails, like snow fleas, are readily observed on warm winter days when it is active and its dark color contrasts sharply with a background of snow.

In addition, a few species routinely climb trees and form a dominant component of canopy fauna, where they may be collected by beating or insecticide fogging. In temperate regions, a few species (e.g. Anurophorus laricis, Entomobrya albocincta, Xenylla xavieri, Hypogastrura arborea) are almost exclusively arboreal. In tropical regions a single square meter of canopy habitat can support many species of Collembola.

The main ecological factor driving the local distribution of species is the vertical stratification of the ecosystem: in woodland a continuous change in species assemblages can be observed from tree canopies to ground vegetation then to plant litter down to deeper soil horizons. This is a complex factor embracing both nutritional and physiological requirements, together with behavioural trends, dispersal limitation and probable species interactions. Some species have been shown to exhibit negative or positive gravitropism, which adds a behavioural dimension to this still poorly understood vertical segregation. Experiments with peat samples turned upside down showed two types of responses to disturbance of this vertical gradient, called stayers and movers.

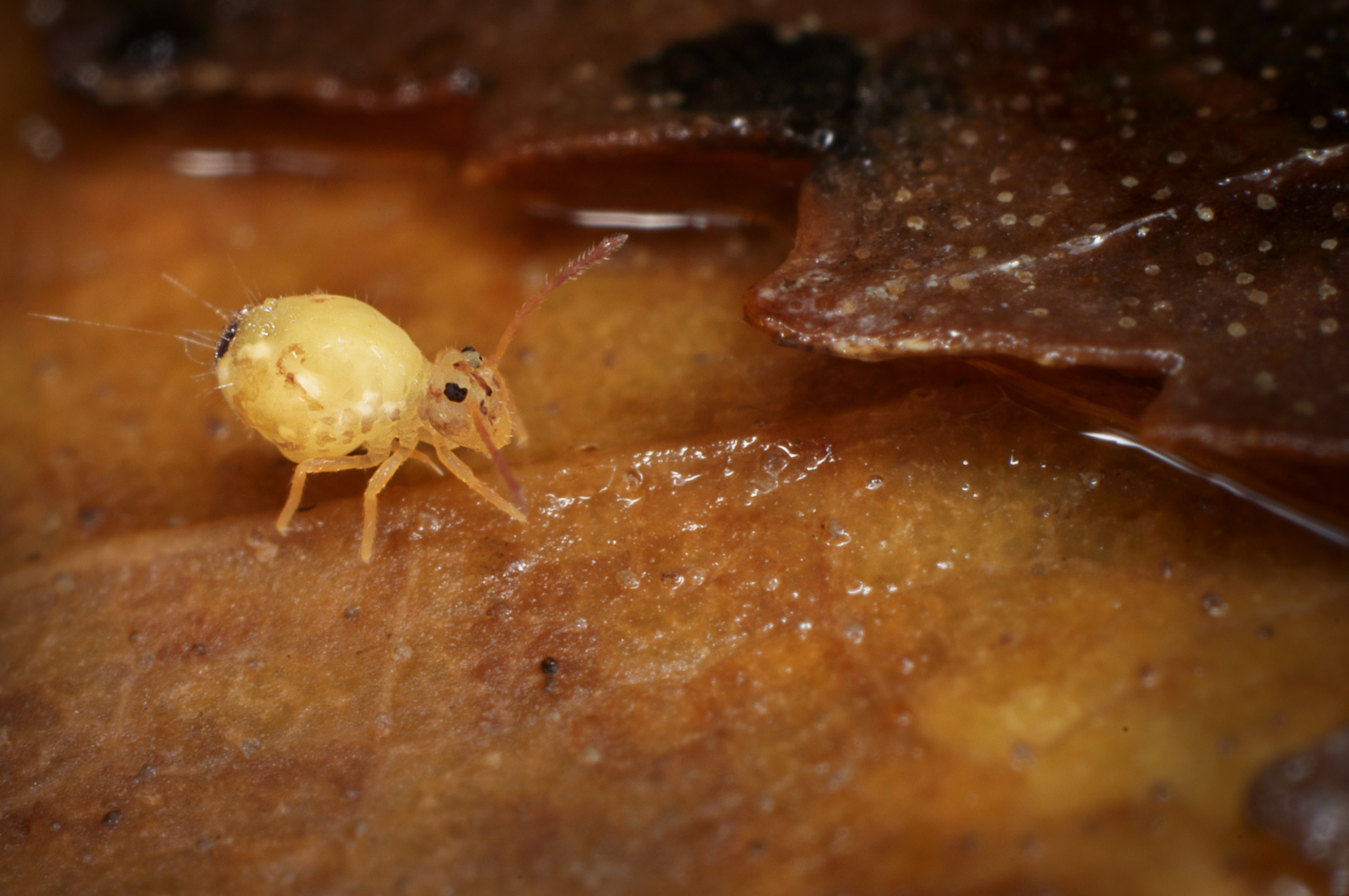
Dicyrtomina sp. on leaf

As a group, springtails are highly sensitive to desiccation, because of their tegumentary respiration, although some species with thin, permeable cuticles have been shown to resist severe drought by regulating the osmotic pressure of their body fluid. The gregarious behaviour of Collembola, mostly driven by the attractive power of pheromones excreted by adults, gives more chance to every juvenile or adult individual to find suitable, better protected places, where desiccation could be avoided and reproduction and survival rates (thereby fitness) could be kept at an optimum. Sensitivity to drought varies from species to species and increases during ecdysis. Given that springtails moult repeatedly during their entire life (an ancestral character in Hexapoda) they spend much time in concealed micro-sites where they can find protection against desiccation and predation during ecdysis, an advantage reinforced by synchronized moulting. The high humidity of many caves also favours springtails and there are numerous cave adapted species, including one, Plutomurus ortobalaganensis living 1,980 metres (6,500 ft) down the Krubera Cave.

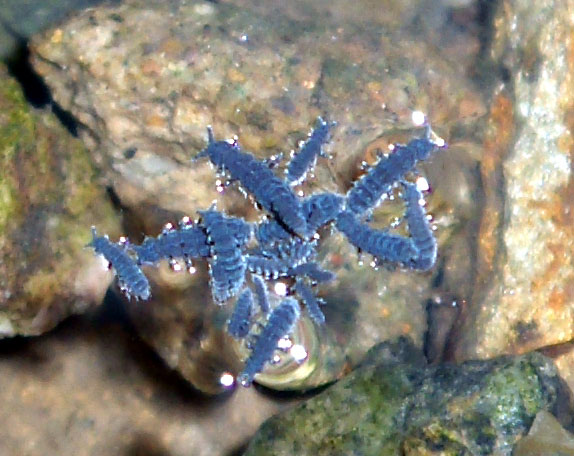
Anurida maritima on water

The horizontal distribution of springtail species is affected by environmental factors which act at the landscape scale, such as soil acidity, moisture and light. Requirements for pH can be reconstructed experimentally. Altitudinal changes in species distribution can be at least partly explained by increased acidity at higher elevation. Moisture requirements, among other ecological and behavioural factors, explain why some species cannot live aboveground, or retreat in the soil during dry seasons, but also why some epigeal springtails are always found in the vicinity of ponds and lakes, such as the hygrophilous Isotomurus palustris. Adaptive features, such as the presence of a fan-like wettable mucro, allow some species to move at the surface of water in freshwater and marine environments. Podura aquatica, a unique representative of the family Poduridae (and one of the first springtails to have been described by Carl Linnaeus), spends its entire life at the surface of water, its wettable eggs dropping in water until the non-wettable first instar hatches then surfaces. A few genera are capable of being submerged, and after molting young springtails lose their water repellent properties and are able to survive submerged under water.

In a variegated landscape, made of a patchwork of closed (woodland) and open (meadows, cereal crops) environments, most soil-dwelling species are not specialized and can be found everywhere, but most epigeal and litter-dwelling species are attracted to a particular environment, either forested or not. As a consequence of dispersal limitation, landuse change, when too rapid, may cause the local disappearance of slow-moving, specialist species, a phenomenon the measure of which has been called colonisation credit.

=== Role in turfgrass ecosystems ===
In managed turfgrass and urban lawn ecosystems, Collembola function as "thatch busters", playing a significant role in the decomposition of thatch, i.e. the layer of living and dead organic matter between the green vegetation and the soil surface. A common model species in North American turfgrass is Isotomiella minor.

=== Relationship with humans ===
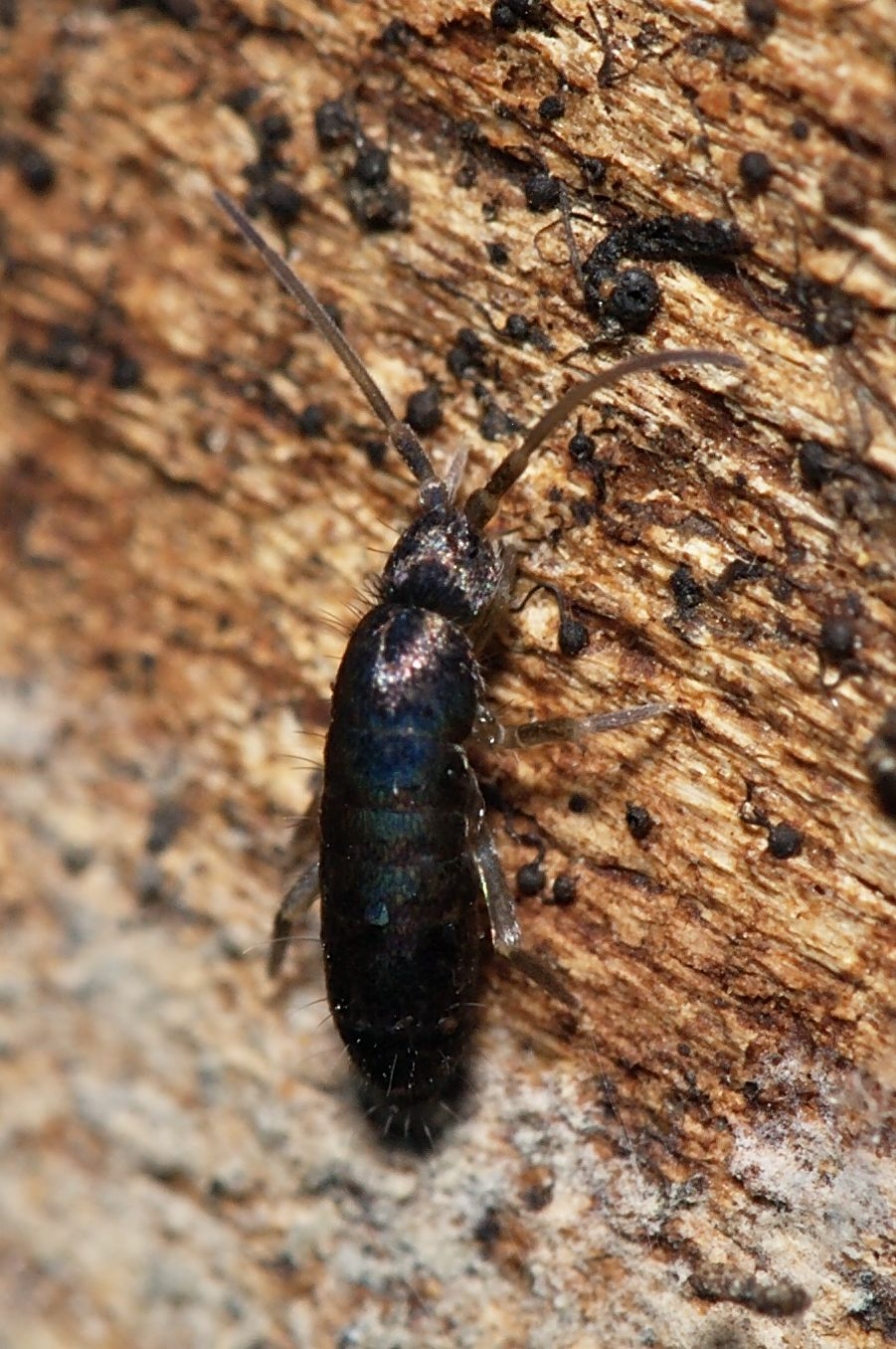
Tomocerus sp. from Germany

Springtails are well known as pests of some agricultural crops. Sminthurus viridis, the lucerne flea, has been shown to cause severe damage to agricultural crops, and is considered as a pest in Australia. Onychiuridae are also known to feed on tubers and to damage them to some extent. However, by their capacity to carry spores of mycorrhizal fungi and mycorrhiza helper bacteria on their tegument, soil springtails play a positive role in the establishment of plant-fungal symbioses and thus are beneficial to agriculture. They also contribute to controlling plant fungal diseases through their active consumption of mycelia and spores of damping-off and pathogenic fungi. It has been suggested that they could be reared to be used for the control of pathogenic fungi in greenhouses and other indoor cultures.

Springtails sometimes find their way inside human living spaces. However, most pesticides are not effective against them and moisture-removal strategies are the best line of defense to combat infestations.

Various sources and publications have suggested that some springtails may parasitize humans, but this is entirely inconsistent with their biology, and no such phenomenon has ever been scientifically confirmed, though it has been documented that the scales or hairs from springtails can cause irritation when rubbed onto the skin. They may sometimes be abundant indoors in damp places such as bathrooms and basements, and incidentally found on clothes or skin. More often, claims of persistent human skin infection by springtails may indicate a neurological problem, such as delusional parasitosis or pareidolia, a psychological rather than entomological problem. Researchers themselves may be subject to psychological phenomena. For example, a publication in 2004 claiming that springtails had been found in skin samples was later determined to be a case of pareidolia; that is, no springtail specimens were actually recovered, but the researchers had digitally enhanced photos of sample debris to create images resembling small arthropod heads, which then were claimed to be springtail remnants. However, Steve Hopkin reports one instance of an entomologist aspirating an Isotoma species and in the process accidentally inhaling some of their eggs, which hatched in his nasal cavity and made him quite ill until they were flushed out.

In 1952, during the Korean War, China accused the United States military of spreading bacteria-laden insects and other objects by dropping them from P-51 fighters above rebel villages over North Korea, an allegation of bacterial warfare. In all, the U.S. was accused of dropping ants, beetles, crickets, fleas, flies, grasshoppers, lice, springtails, and stoneflies as part of a biological warfare effort. The alleged associated diseases included anthrax, cholera, dysentery, fowl septicemia, paratyphoid, plague, scrub typhus, small pox, and typhoid. China created an international scientific commission for investigating possible bacterial warfare, eventually ruling that the United States probably did engage in limited biological warfare in Korea. The US government denied all the allegations, and instead proposed that the United Nations send a formal inquiry committee to China and Korea, but China and Korea refused to cooperate. U.S. and Canadian entomologists further claimed that the accusations were ridiculous and argued that anomalous appearances of insects could be explained through natural phenomena, but speculation to this day exists as to whether the U.S. may have been experimenting in the field during the Korean war. Springtail species cited in allegations of biological warfare in the Korean War were Isotoma (Desoria) negishina (a local species) and the "white rat springtail" Folsomia candida.

Captive springtails are often kept in a terrarium as part of a clean-up crew.

=== Ecotoxicology laboratory animals ===
Springtails are currently used in laboratory tests for the early detection of soil pollution. Acute and chronic toxicity tests have been performed by researchers, mostly using the parthenogenetic isotomid Folsomia candida. These tests have been standardized. A ringtest on the biology and ecotoxicology of Folsomia candida, compared with the sexual nearby species Folsomia fimetaria (sometimes preferred to Folsomia candida), was performed by 14 participating laboratories and concluded that both species could be proposed for acute and chronic toxicity testing. At first sight care should be taken that different strains of the same species may be conducive to different results. A study comparing two RAPD-defined clones of Folsomia candida did not reveal significant sensitivity differences throughout a concentration gradient of cadmium, while another study comparing two strains of the same species and the same contaminant (cadmium) came to the reverse conclusion.

Avoidance tests have been also performed, also showing that different strains of Folsomia candida responded differently. Avoidance tests have been standardized, too. Avoidance tests are complementary to toxicity tests, but they also offer several advantages: they are more rapid (thus cheaper), more sensitive and they are environmentally more reliable, because in the field Collembola move actively far from pollution spots. It may be hypothesized that the soil could become locally depauperated in animals (and thus improper to normal use) while below thresholds of toxicity.

Contrary to earthworms, but see and like many insects and molluscs, Collembola are very sensitive to herbicides.

The springtail Folsomia candida is also becoming a genomic model organism for soil toxicology. With microarray technology the expression of thousands of genes can be measured in parallel. The gene expression profiles of Folsomia candida exposed to environmental toxicants allow fast and sensitive detection of pollution, and additionally clarifies molecular mechanisms causing toxicity.

Collembola have been found to be useful as bio-indicators of soil quality. Laboratory studies have been conducted that validated that the jumping ability of springtails can be used to evaluate the soil quality of Cu- and Ni-polluted sites.

== Climate warming impact ==
In polar regions that are expected to experience among the most rapid impact from climate warming, springtails have shown contrasting responses to warming in experimental warming studies. There are negative, positive and neutral responses reported. Neutral responses to experimental warming have also been reported in studies of non-polar regions. The importance of soil moisture has been demonstrated in experiments using infrared heating in an alpine meadow, which had a negative effect on mesofauna biomass and diversity in drier parts and a positive effect in moist sub-areas. Furthermore, a study with 20 years of experimental warming in three contrasting plant communities found that small scale heterogeneity may buffer springtails to potential climate warming.

== Reproduction ==
Sexual reproduction occurs through the clustered or scattered deposition of spermatophores by male adults. Stimulation of spermatophore deposition by female pheromones has been demonstrated in Sinella curviseta. Mating behavior can be observed in Symphypleona. Among Symphypleona, males of some Sminthuridae use a clasping organ located on their antenna. Many springtails, mostly those living in deeper soil horizons, are parthenogenetic, which favors reproduction to the detriment of genetic diversity and thereby to population tolerance of environmental hazards. Parthenogenesis (also called thelytoky) is under the control of symbiotic bacteria of the genus Wolbachia, which live, reproduce and are carried in female reproductive organs and eggs of Collembola. Feminizing Wolbachia species are widespread in arthropods and nematodes, where they co-evolved with most of their host lineages.
