= Desoria elegans =

Scientific classification
- Domain: Eukaryota
- Kingdom: Animalia
- Phylum: Arthropoda
- Class: Collembola
- Order: Entomobryomorpha
- Family: Isotomidae
- Genus: Desoria
- Species: D. elegans

Binomial name
- Desoria elegans (Carl, J, 1899)

Synonyms
- Isotoma elegans Carl, 1899

Species of springtail

Desoria elegans is a species of springtail from Switzerland.
