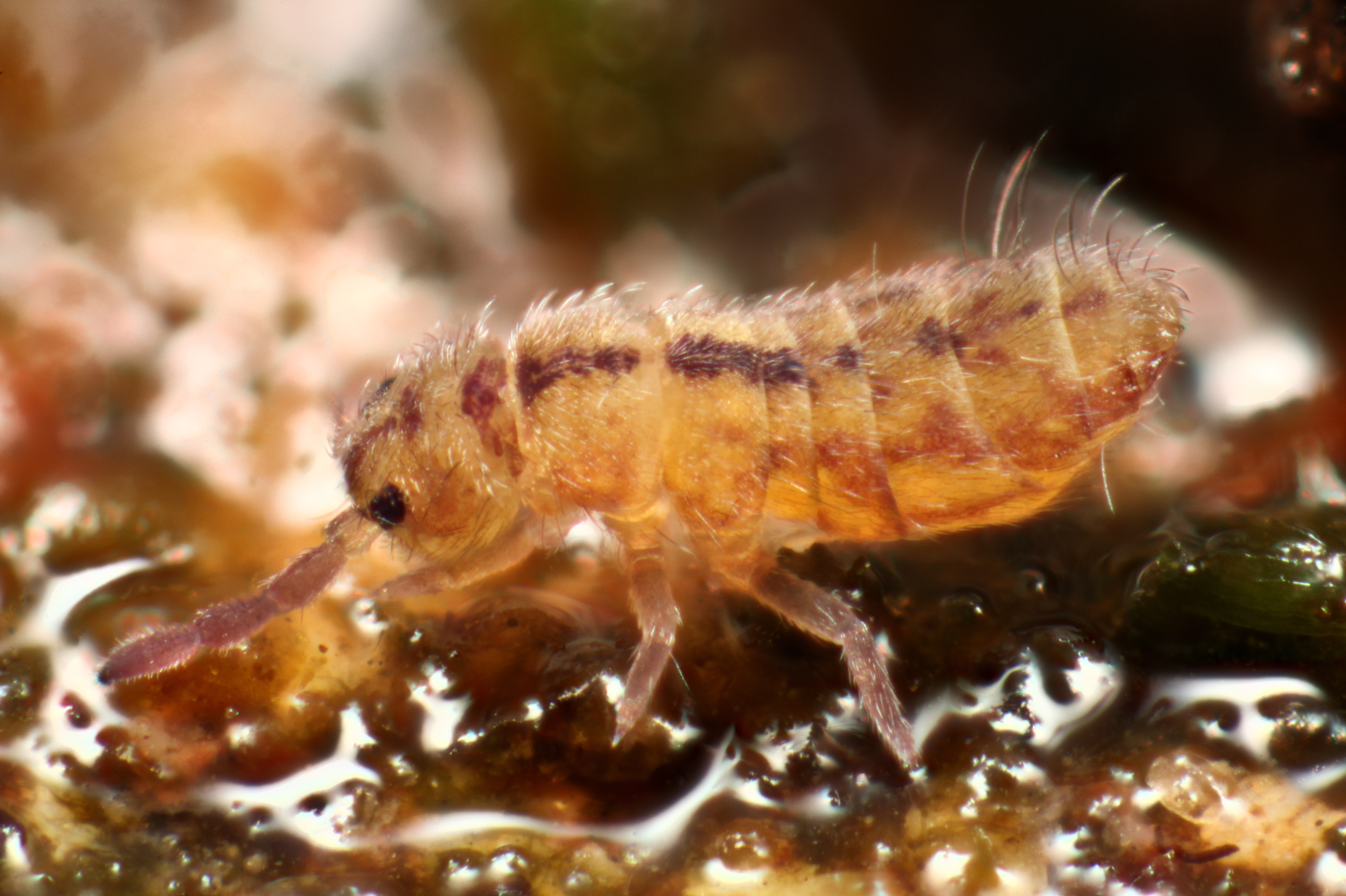

Scientific classification
- Kingdom: Animalia
- Phylum: Arthropoda
- Class: Collembola
- Order: Entomobryomorpha
- Family: Isotomidae
- Genus: Isotomurus
- Species: I. palustris

Binomial name
- Isotomurus palustris (Müller, 1776)

Synonyms
- Podura palustris Müller, 1776

= Isotomurus palustris =

Species of springtail

Isotomurus palustris, the marsh springtail, is a species of elongate-bodied springtail in the family Isotomidae. It is found in Europe, Africa, North America, and Central America.

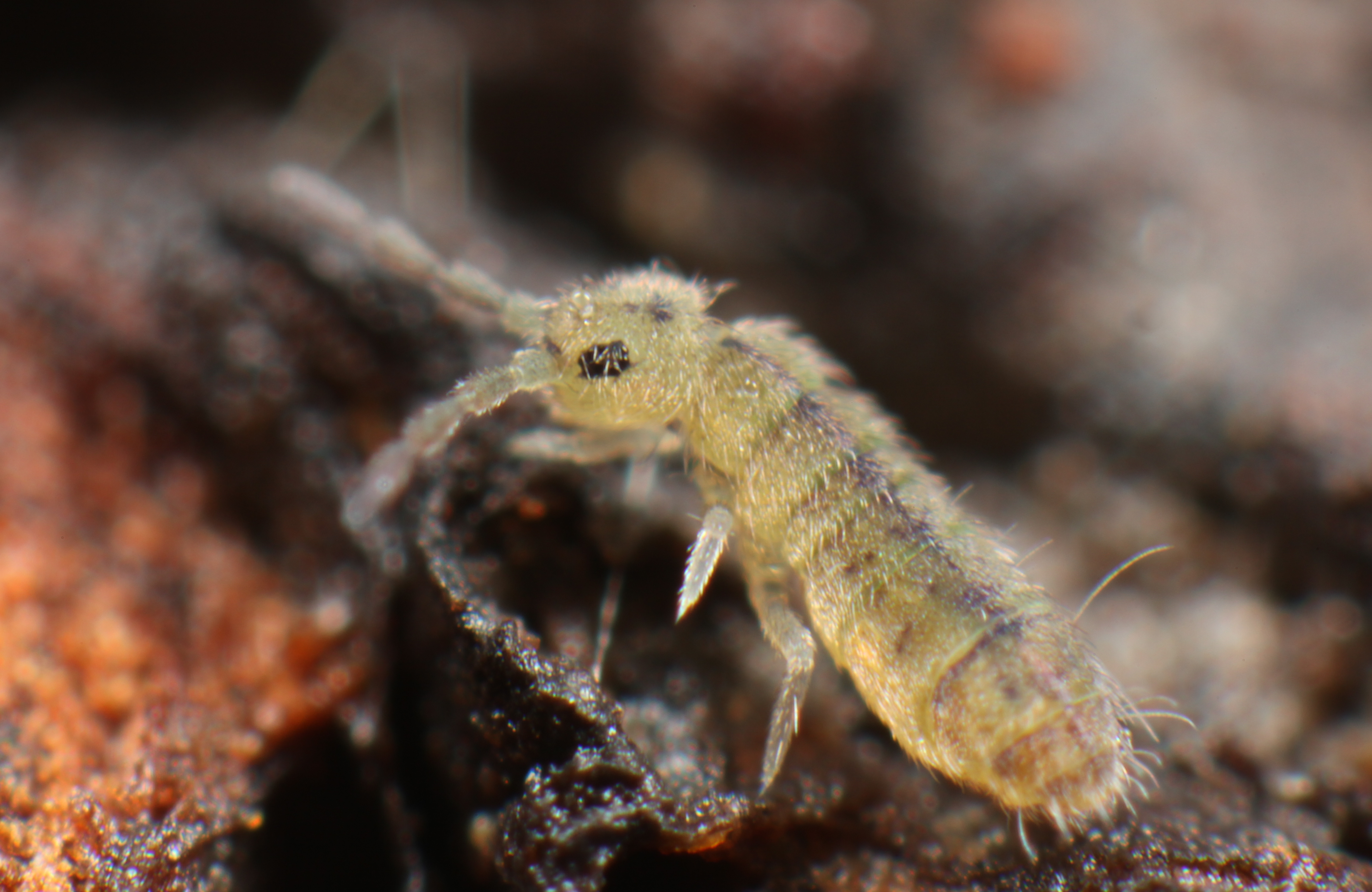
Marsh springtail, Isotomurus palustris

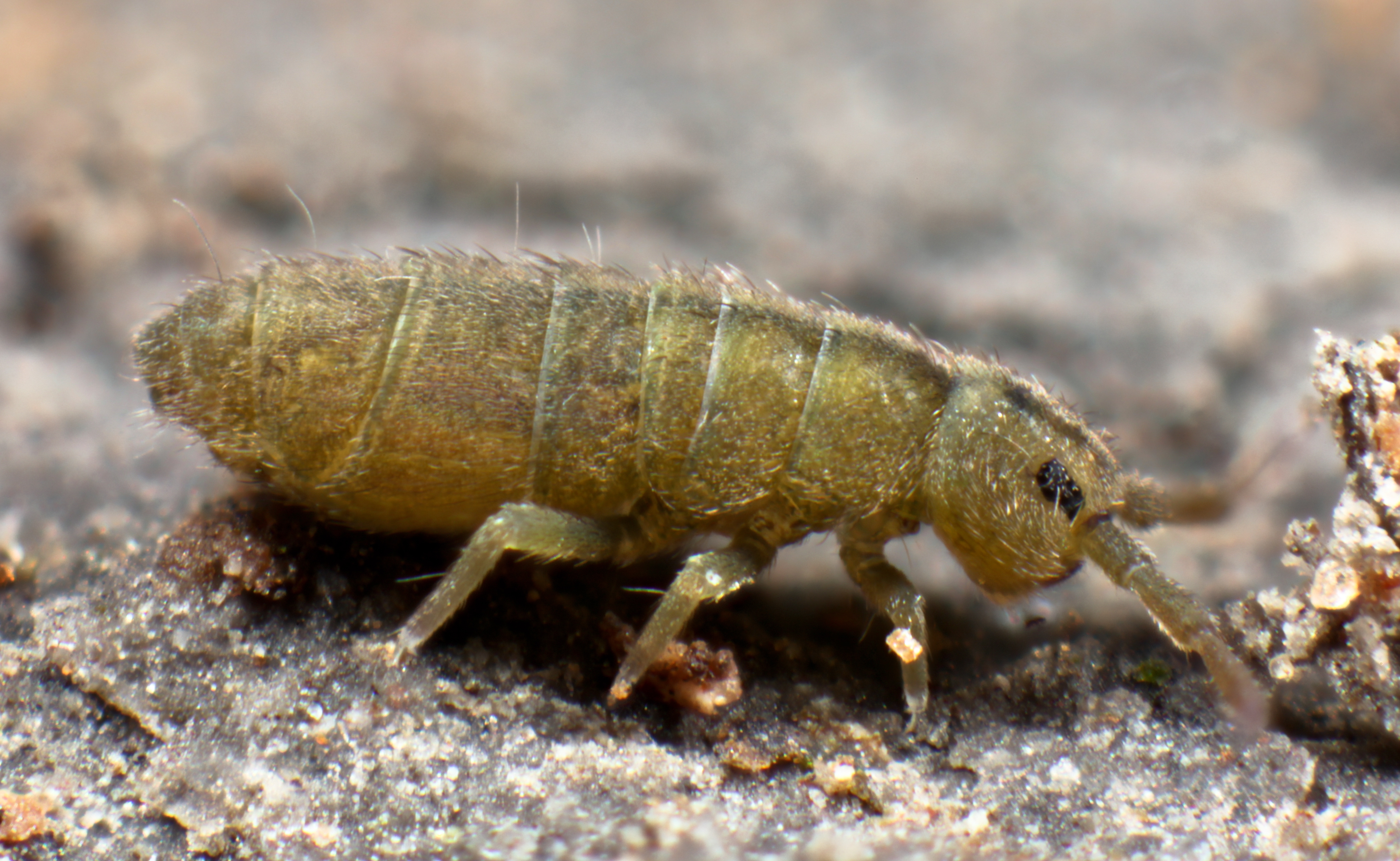
Marsh springtail, Isotomurus palustris

It mainly feeds on other invertebrates (nematodes, copepods or remains of other dead invertebrates), but can also feed on fungi, bacteria, algae, root secretions and detritus.
