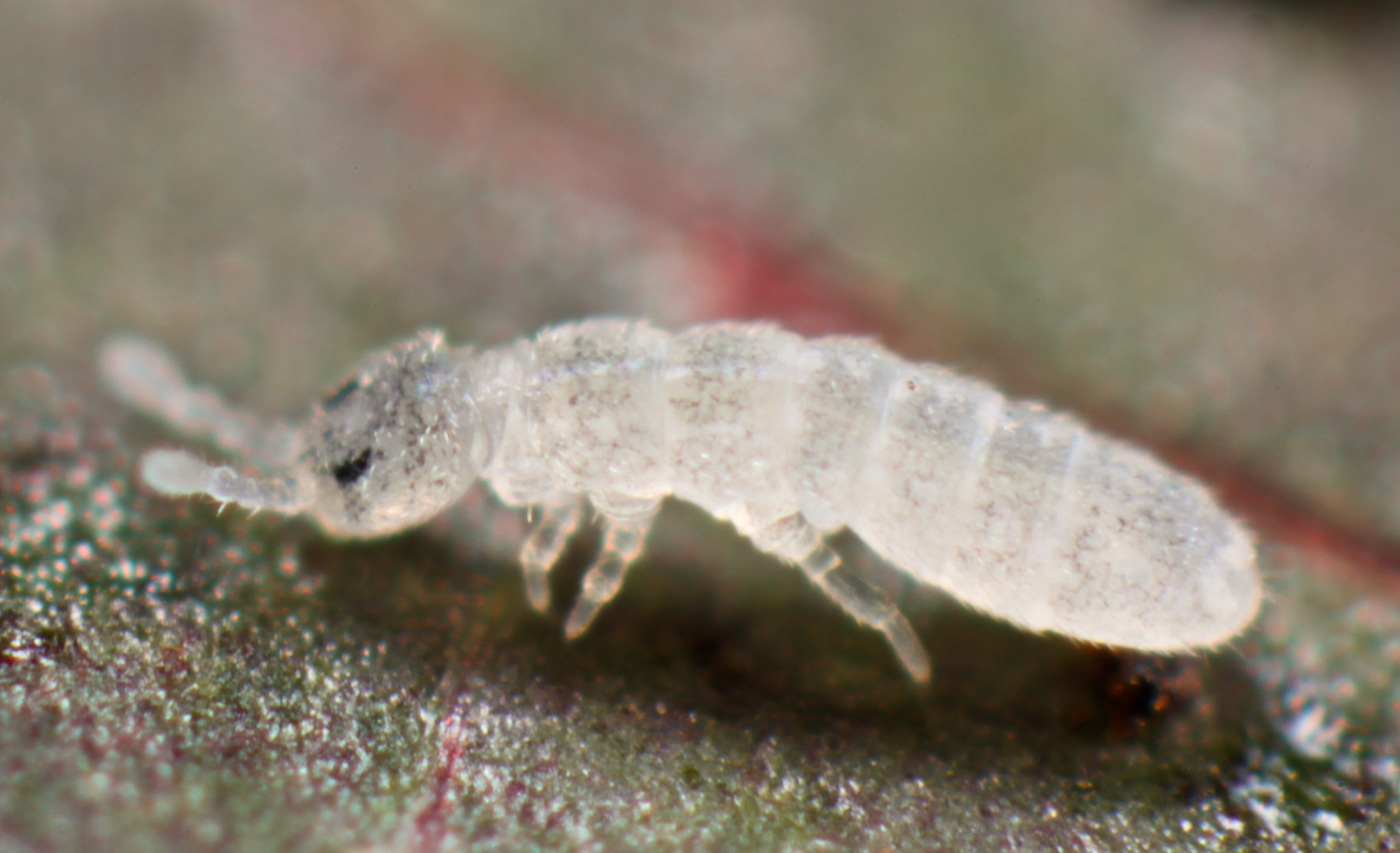

Scientific classification
- Domain: Eukaryota
- Kingdom: Animalia
- Phylum: Arthropoda
- Class: Collembola
- Order: Entomobryomorpha
- Family: Isotomidae
- Genus: Proisotoma
- Species: P. minuta

Binomial name
- Proisotoma minuta (Tullberg, 1871)

Synonyms
- Isotoma minuta Tullberg, 1871; Proisotoma guthriei Linnaniemi, 1912

= Proisotoma minuta =

Species of springtail

Proisotoma minuta is a species of elongate-bodied springtail in the family Isotomidae. It is found in Europe. It has also been found in agricultural land in Manitoba, Canada. This species is a fungivore.

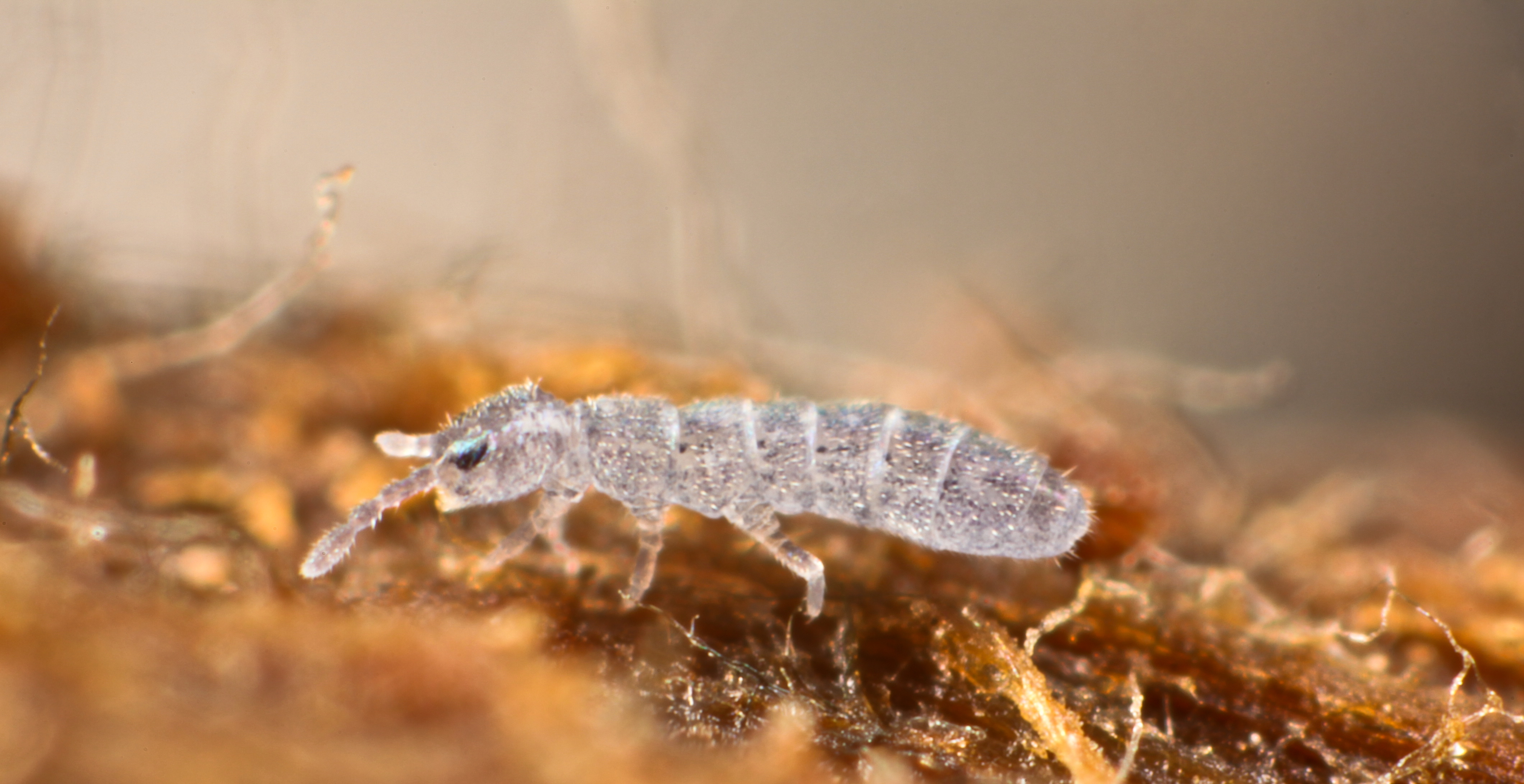
