= Isotoma =

Isotoma may refer to:

- Isotoma (plant), a plant genus
- Isotoma (springtail), a springtail genus
