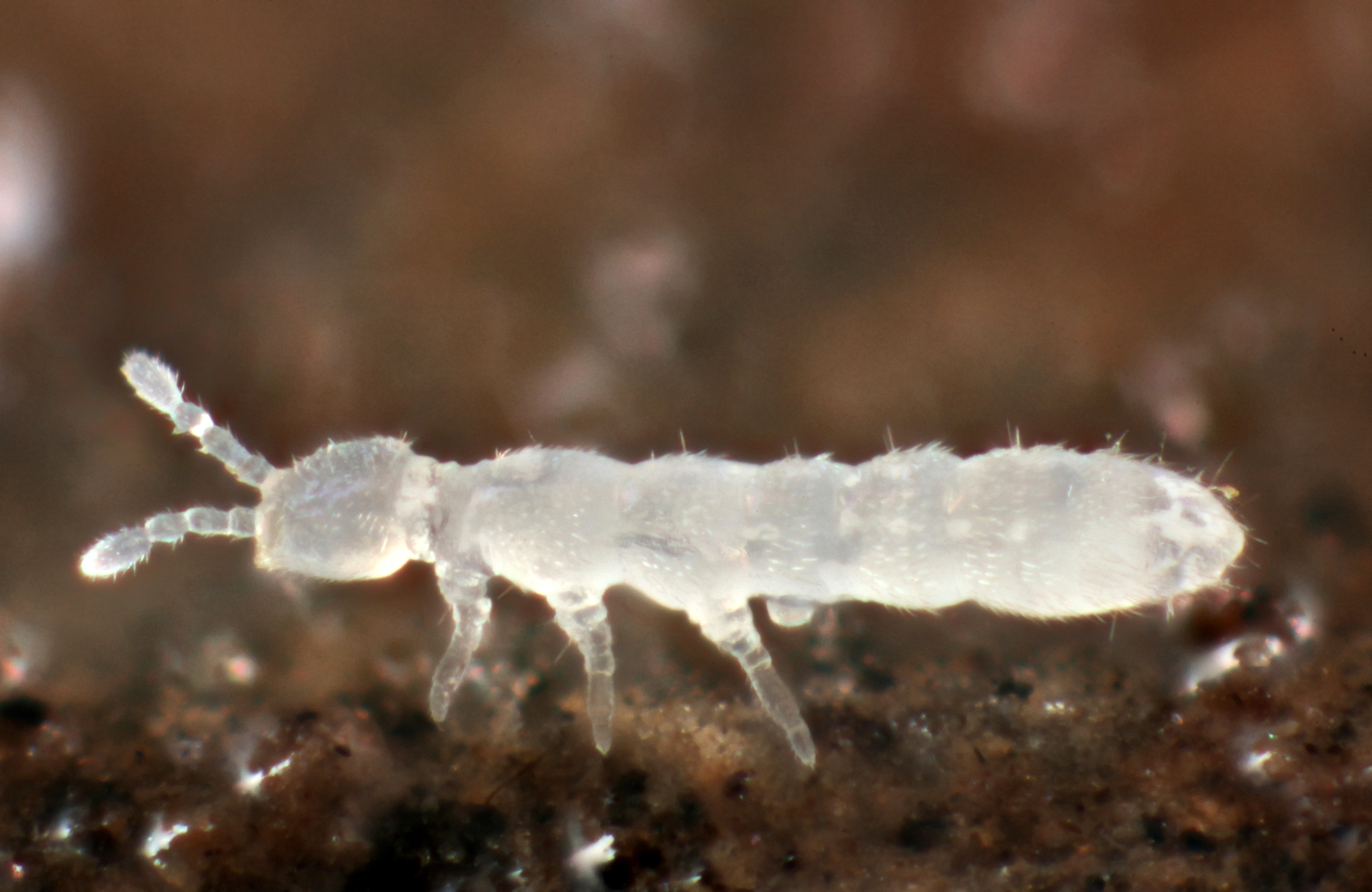
- Folsomia

Scientific classification
- Domain: Eukaryota
- Kingdom: Animalia
- Phylum: Arthropoda
- Class: Collembola
- Order: Entomobryomorpha
- Family: Isotomidae
- Subfamily: Proisotominae

= Proisotominae =

Subfamily of springtails

Proisotominae is a subfamily of elongate-bodied springtails in the family Isotomidae. There are about 7 genera and more than 190 described species in Proisotominae.

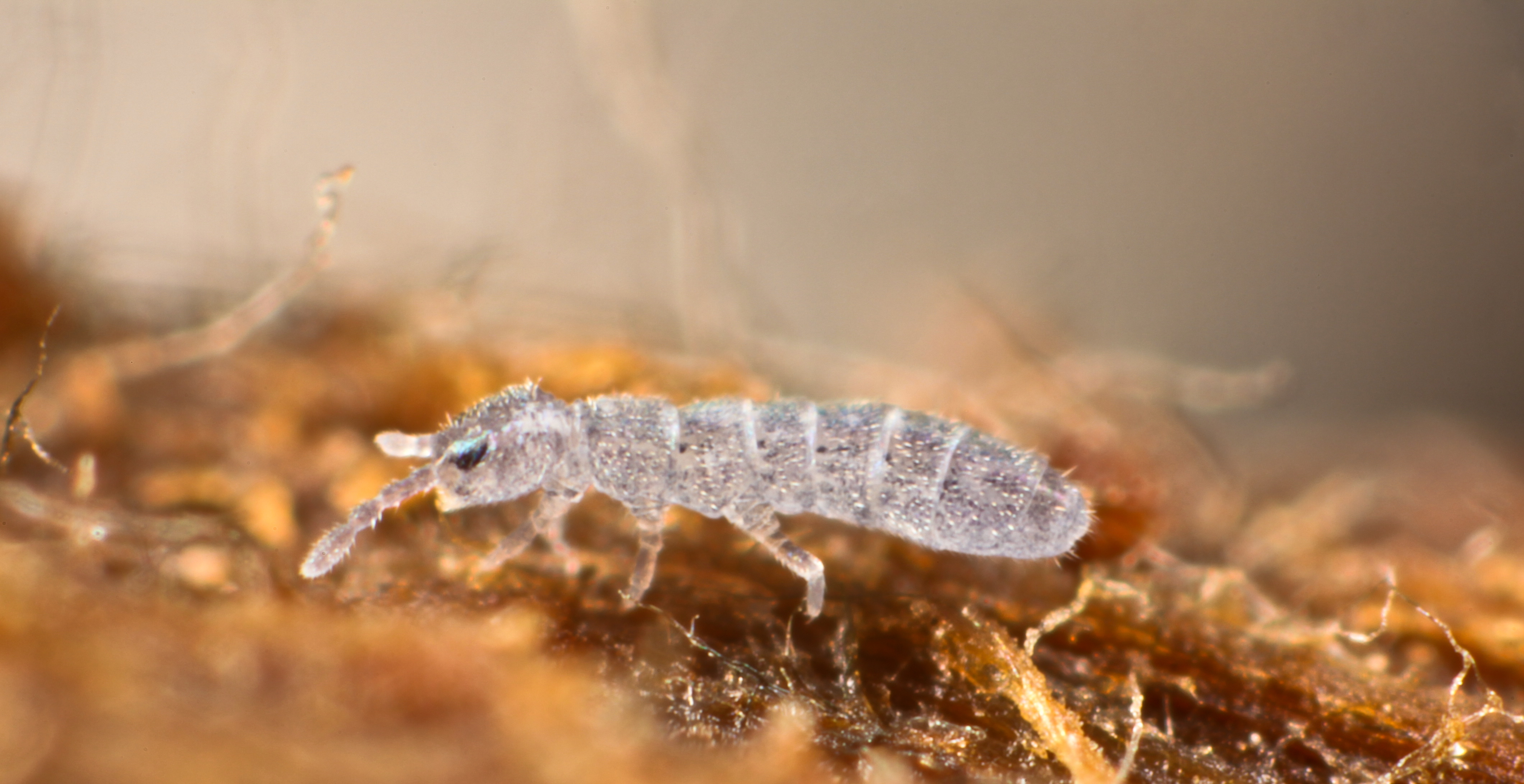
Proisotoma minuta

== Genera ==
These seven genera belong to the subfamily Proisotominae:

- Archisotoma Linnaniemi, 1912
- Ballistura Börner, 1906
- Folsomia Willem, 1902
- Folsomina Denis, 1931
- Guthriella Börner, 1906
- Proisotoma Börner, 1901
- Weberacantha Christiansen, 1951
