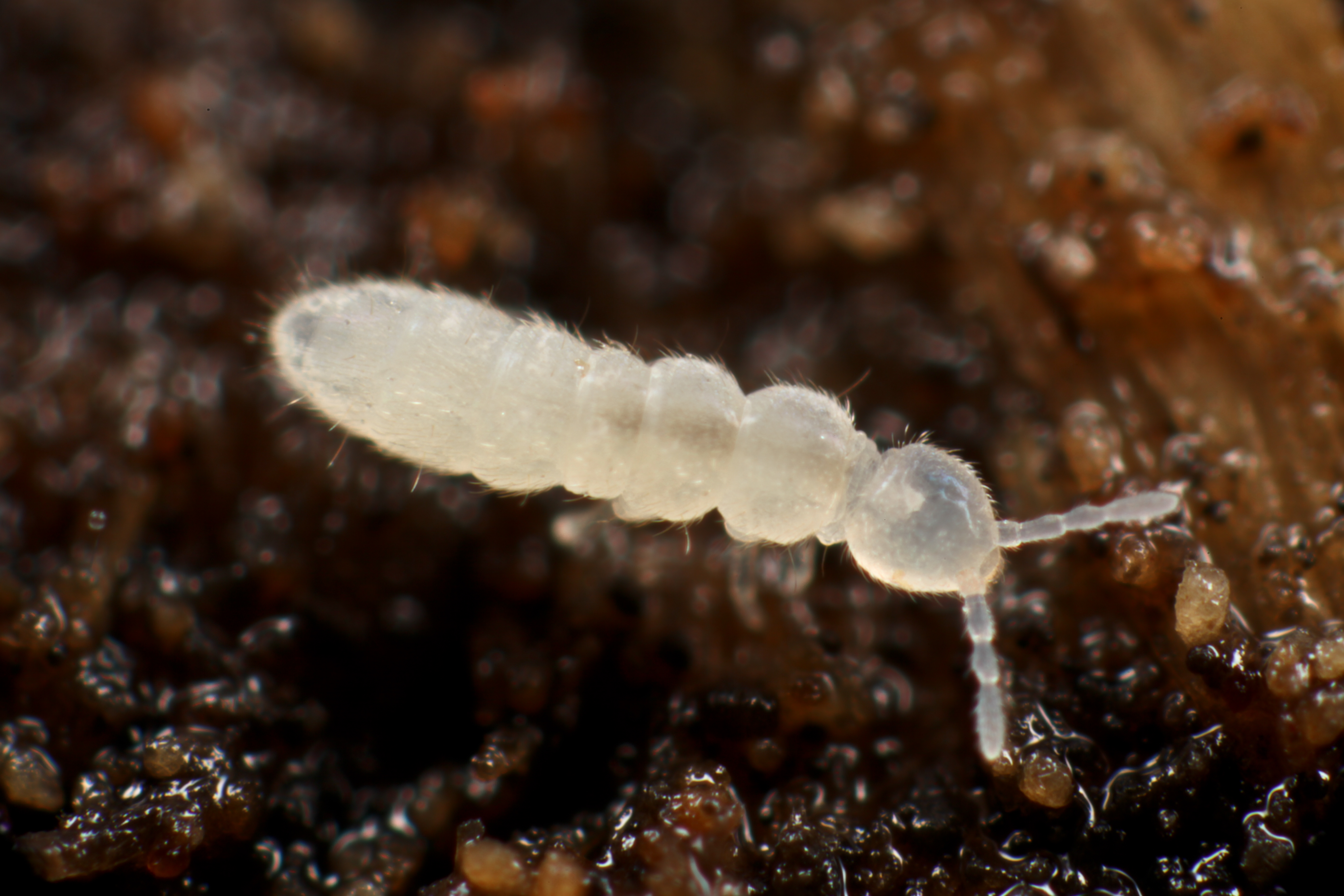

Scientific classification
- Kingdom: Animalia
- Phylum: Arthropoda
- Clade: Pancrustacea
- Class: Collembola
- Order: Entomobryomorpha
- Family: Isotomidae
- Genus: Isotomiella
- Species: I. minor

Binomial name
- Isotomiella minor (Schaeffer, 1896)

= Isotomiella minor =

Species of springtail

Isotomiella minor is a species of elongate-bodied springtail in the family Isotomidae. It is found in Europe.
