= Isotomurus tricolor =

Scientific classification
- Kingdom: Animalia
- Phylum: Arthropoda
- Class: Collembola
- Order: Entomobryomorpha
- Family: Isotomidae
- Genus: Isotomurus
- Species: I. tricolor

Binomial name
- Isotomurus tricolor (Packard, 1873)

Species of springtail

Isotomurus tricolor is a species of elongate-bodied springtails in the family Isotomidae.
