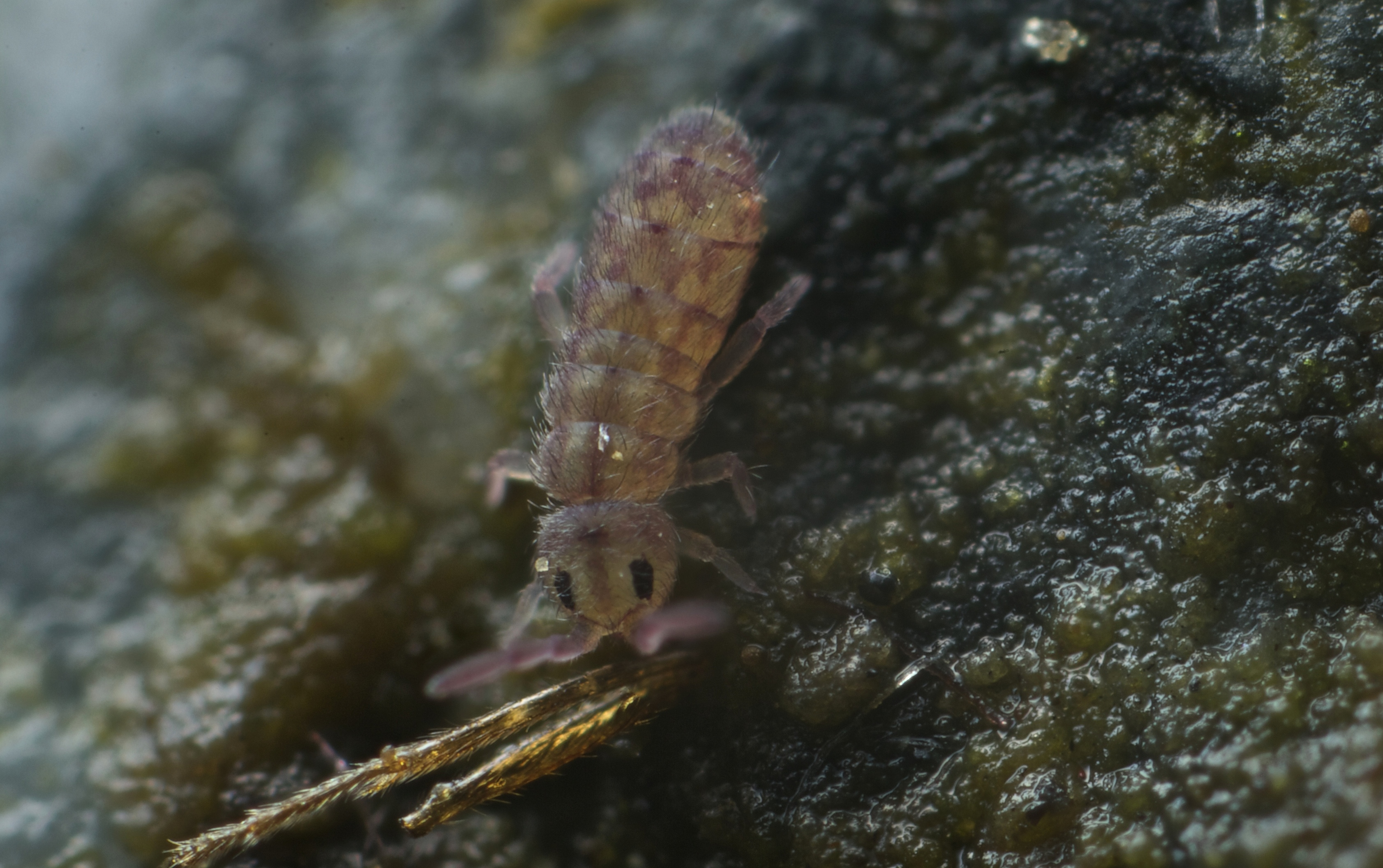
- Unidentified species of Acanthromurus

Scientific classification
- Domain: Eukaryota
- Kingdom: Animalia
- Phylum: Arthropoda
- Class: Collembola
- Order: Entomobryomorpha
- Family: Isotomidae
- Subfamily: Isotominae
- Genus: Acanthomurus; Womersley, 1934

= Acanthomurus =

Genus of springtails

Acanthomurus is a genus of Collembola belonging to the family Isotomidae. The genus was first described by Herbert Womersley in 1934, and is found in Tasmania, New Zealand and the Subantarctic islands.

== Species ==
- Acanthomurus alpinus J.T.Salmon, 1941
- Acanthomurus plumbeus Womersley, 1934
- Acanthomurus rivalis Wise, 1964
- Acanthomurus setosus J.T.Salmon, 1941
- Acanthomurus womersleyi J.T.Salmon, 1941
