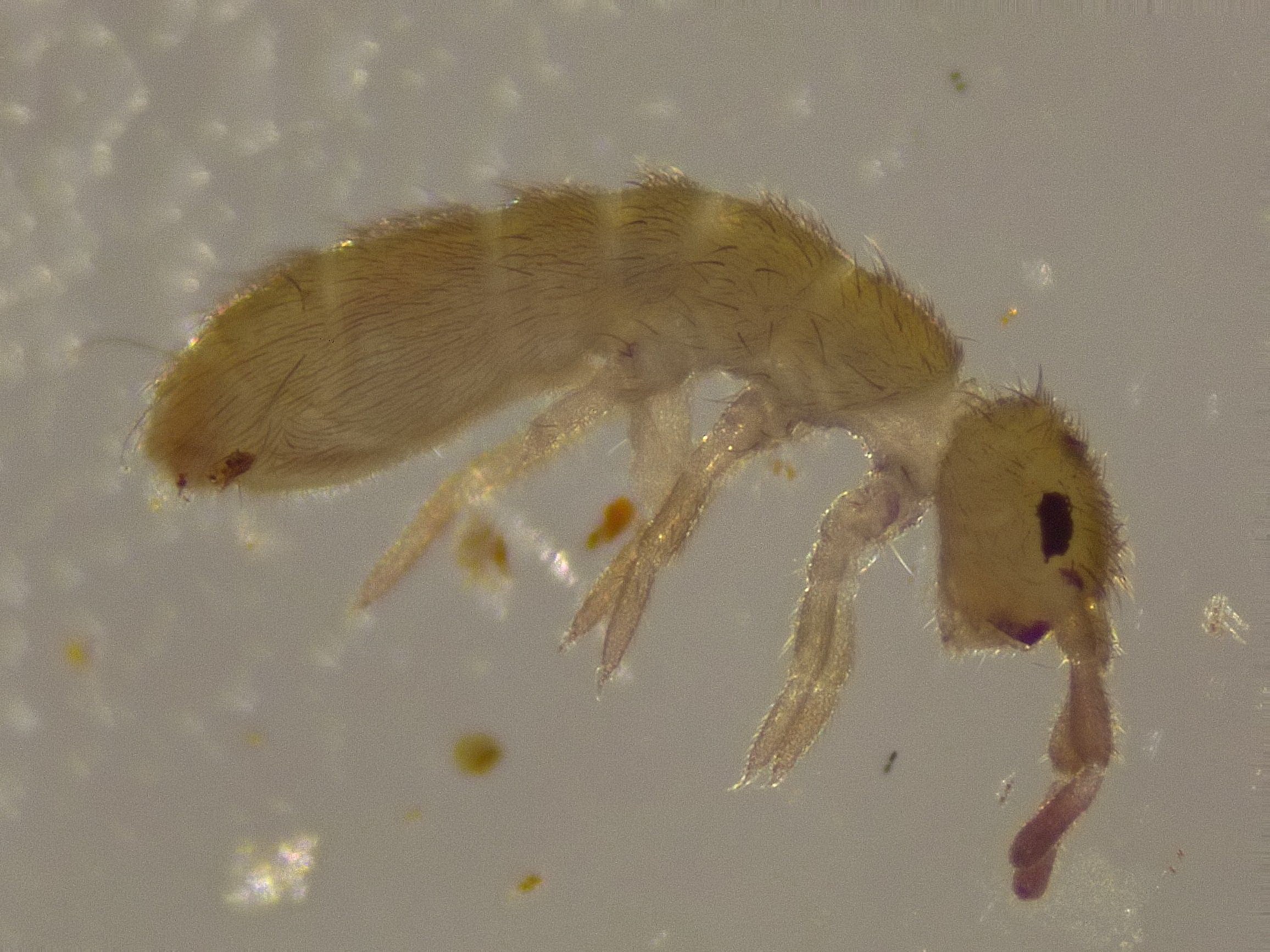
- Isotoma viridis

Scientific classification
- Domain: Eukaryota
- Kingdom: Animalia
- Phylum: Arthropoda
- Class: Collembola
- Order: Entomobryomorpha
- Family: Isotomidae
- Subfamily: Isotominae

= Isotominae =

Subfamily of springtails

Isotominae is a subfamily of elongate-bodied springtails in the family Isotomidae. There are about 16 genera and at least 100 described species in Isotominae.

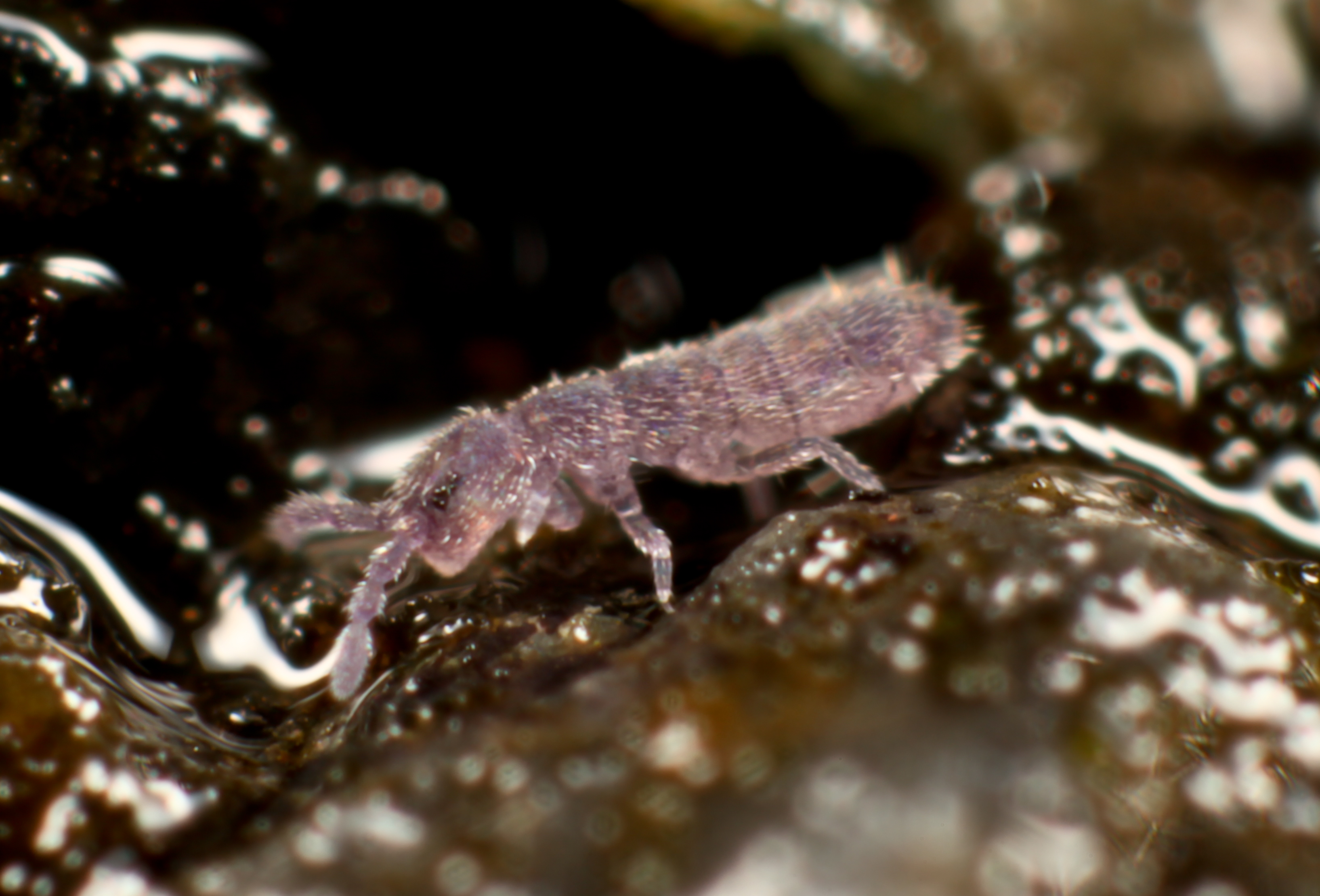
Vertagopus arboreus

== Genera ==
These 16 genera belong to the subfamily Isotominae:

- Agrenia Boerner, 1906^{i g b}
- Axelsonia Boener, 1906^{i c g}
- Degamaea Yosii, 1965^{i c g}
- Desoria Agassiz & Nicolet, 1841^{c g b}
- Hydroisotoma Stach, 1947^{g b}
- Isotoma Bourlet, 1839^{i c g b}
- Isotomiella Bagnall, 1939^{i c g b}
- Isotomurus Boerner, 1903^{i c g b}
- Metisotoma Maynard, 1951^{i c g b}
- Micrisotoma Bellinger, 1952^{i c g}
- Parisotoma Bagnall, 1940^{c g b}
- Pseudisotoma Handschin, 1924^{g b}
- Pseudosorensia D.C.de Izarra, 1972^{g}
- Scutisotoma Bagnall, 1949^{g b}
- Semicerura Maynard, 1951^{i c g}
- Vertagopus Börner, 1906^{g b}

Data sources: i = ITIS, c = Catalogue of Life, g = GBIF, b = Bugguide.net
