= Metisotoma grandiceps =

Scientific classification
- Domain: Eukaryota
- Kingdom: Animalia
- Phylum: Arthropoda
- Class: Collembola
- Order: Entomobryomorpha
- Family: Isotomidae
- Genus: Metisotoma
- Species: M. grandiceps

Binomial name
- Metisotoma grandiceps (Reuter, 1891)

Synonyms
- Isotoma grandiceps Reuter, 1891; Isotoma macnamarai Folsom, 1918; Metisotoma capitona Maynard, 1951

Species of springtail

Metisotoma grandiceps is a species of elongate-bodied springtail in the family Isotomidae. It is the only predatory springtail known so far.
