= Aackia =

Scientific classification
- Domain: Eukaryota
- Kingdom: Animalia
- Phylum: Arthropoda
- Class: Collembola
- Order: Entomobryomorpha
- Family: Isotomidae
- Subfamily: Isotominae
- Genus: Aackia; Yosii, 1966
- Species: A. karakoramensis

Binomial name
- Aackia karakoramensis Yosii, 1966

Genus of springtails

Aackia is a genus of springtails in the family Isotomidae. It is a monotypic genus made up of a single species, Aackia karakoramensis. Both genus and species were described in 1966.
