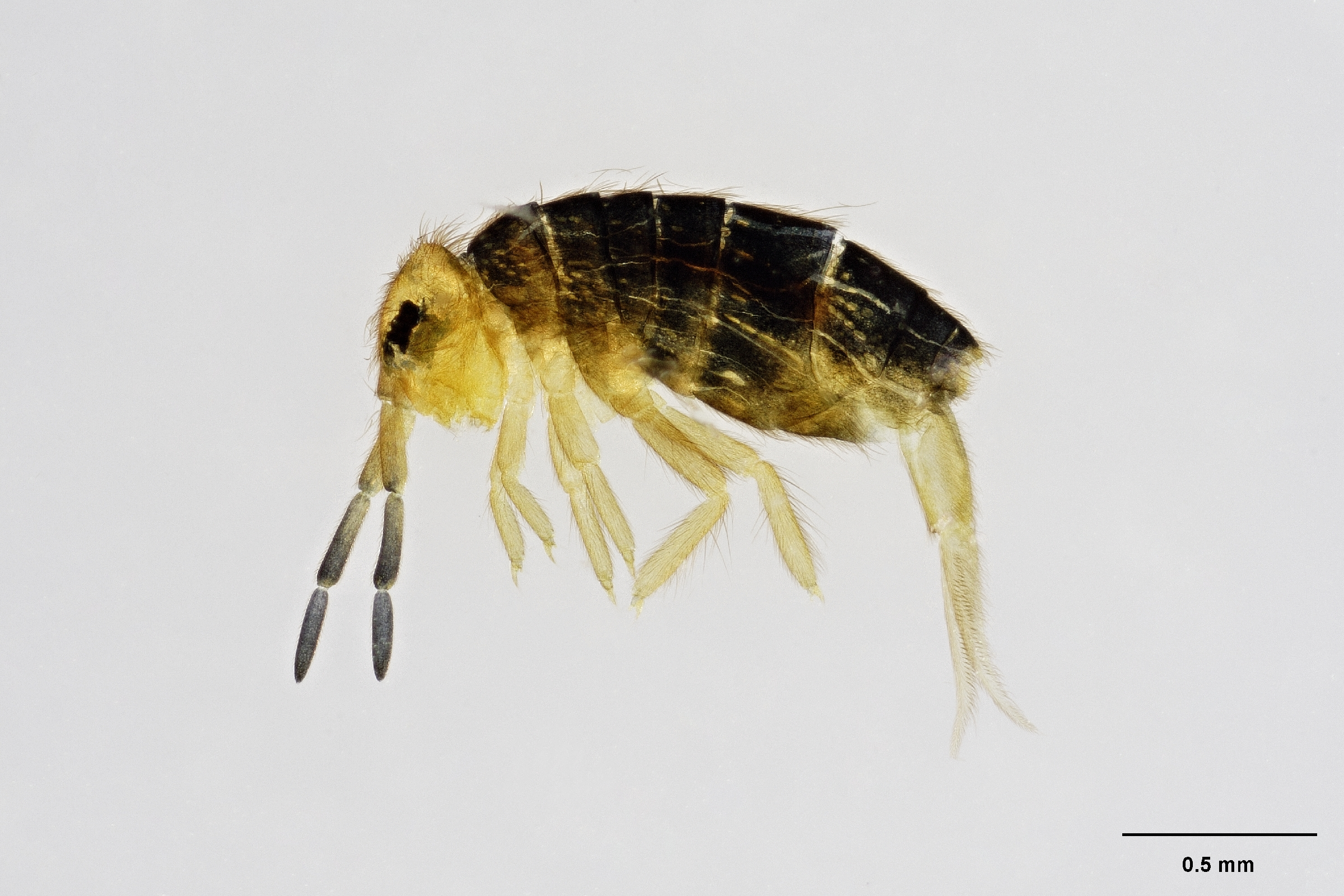
- Holotype of Acanthomurus rivalis from the collections of Te Papa

Scientific classification
- Domain: Eukaryota
- Kingdom: Animalia
- Phylum: Arthropoda
- Class: Collembola
- Order: Entomobryomorpha
- Family: Isotomidae
- Genus: Acanthomurus
- Species: A. rivalis

Binomial name
- Acanthomurus rivalis Wise, 1964

= Acanthomurus rivalis =

Species of springtail

Acanthomurus rivalis is a species of springtail belonging to the family Isotomidae. The species was first described by Keith Arthur John Wise in 1964. The species is native to Campbell Island in the New Zealand Subantarctic Islands.

== Description ==
The species can be differentiated from other Acanthomurus by the absence of claw teeth and the dental spine shape.

== Distribution ==
The species is known to occur in the Campbell Islands. The holotype of the species was found under stream stones on Moubray Hill, with other specimens collected from shallow streams around Perseverance Harbour.
