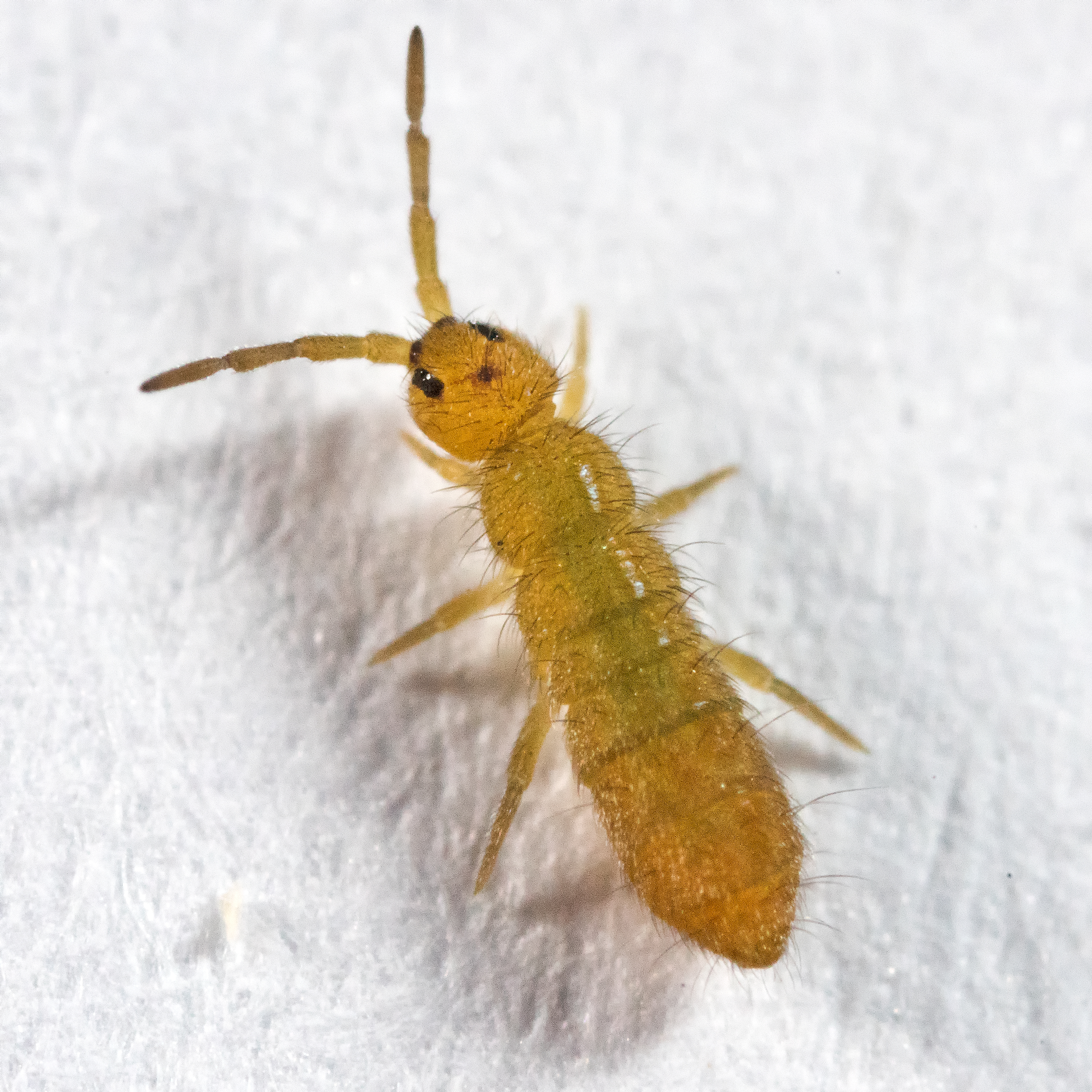

Scientific classification
- Kingdom: Animalia
- Phylum: Arthropoda
- Clade: Pancrustacea
- Class: Collembola
- Order: Entomobryomorpha
- Family: Isotomidae
- Genus: Isotoma
- Species: I. viridis

Binomial name
- Isotoma viridis Bourlet, 1839

Synonyms
- Isotoma arctica Schott, 1893; Isotoma belfragei Packard, 1873; Isotoma capitola Macgillivray. 1896; Isotoma cincta Tullberg, 1876; Isotoma montana Macgillivray, 1896; Isotoma plumbea Packard, 1873; Isotoma pomona Folsom, 1937; Isotoma purpurascens Packard, 1873

= Isotoma viridis =

Species of springtail

Isotoma viridis is a species of elongate-bodied springtails in the family Isotomidae. It has a Holarctic distribution, often found in meadows and agricultural fields. The species feeds on fungal hyphae and decaying leaves.

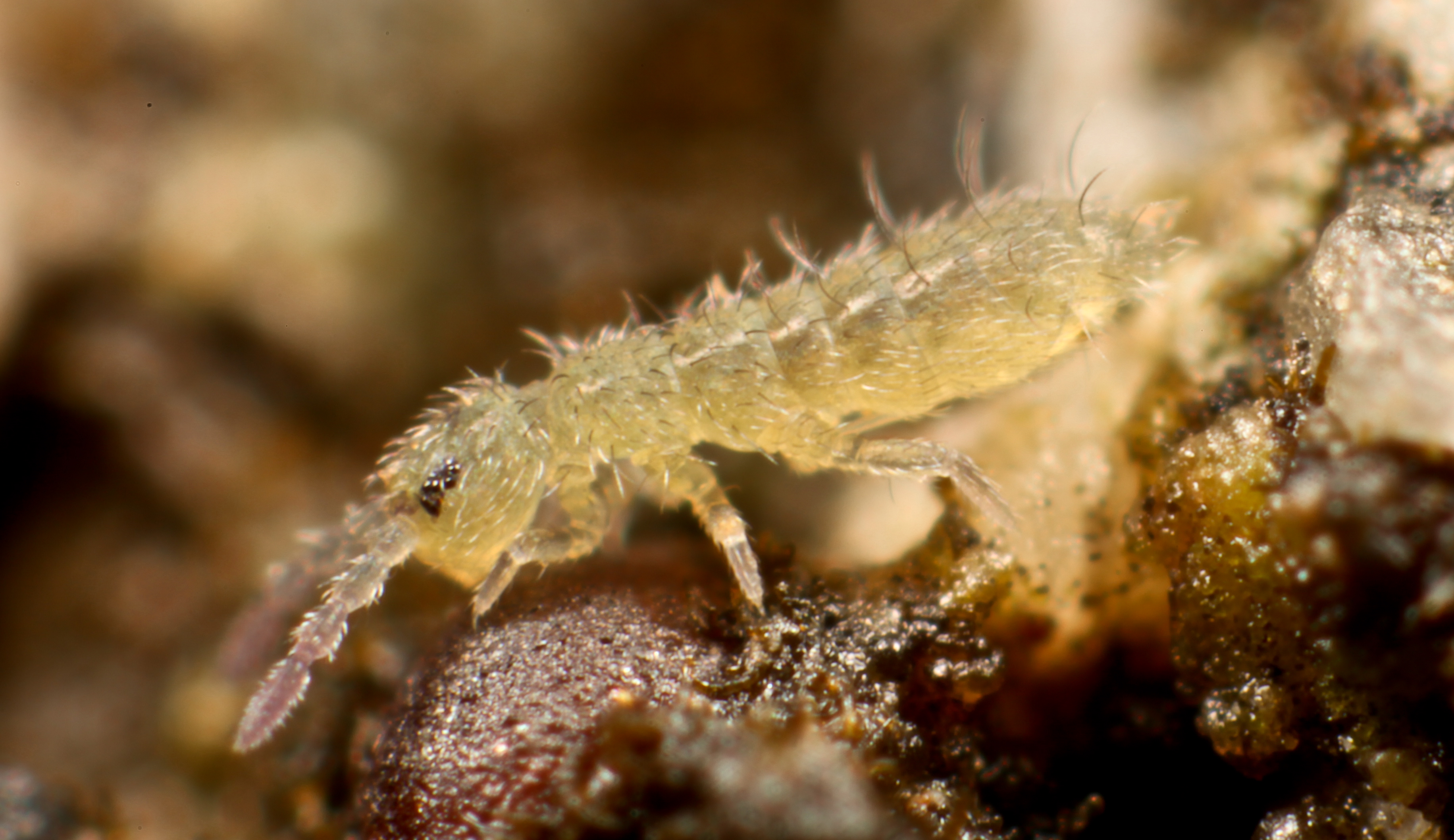
