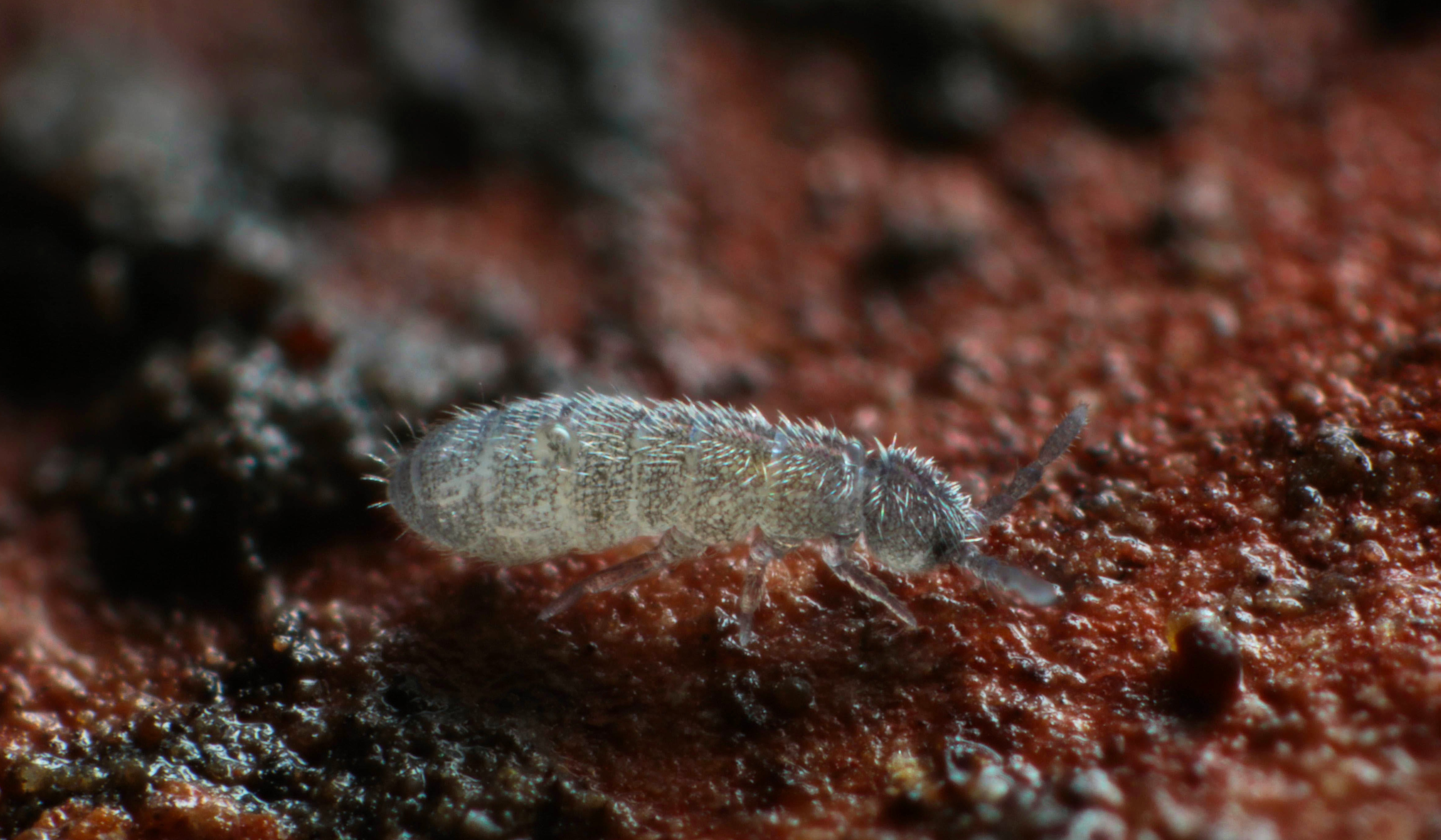

Scientific classification
- Kingdom: Animalia
- Phylum: Arthropoda
- Class: Collembola
- Order: Entomobryomorpha
- Family: Isotomidae
- Genus: Parisotoma
- Species: P. notabilis

Binomial name
- Parisotoma notabilis (Schäffer, 1896)

= Parisotoma notabilis =

Species of springtail

Parisotoma notabilis is a species of elongate-bodied springtail in the family Isotomidae. It can be found in both Europe and North America, with four distinct lineages differing significantly in both mitochondrial and nuclear genetics. The species reproduces by parthenogenesis.

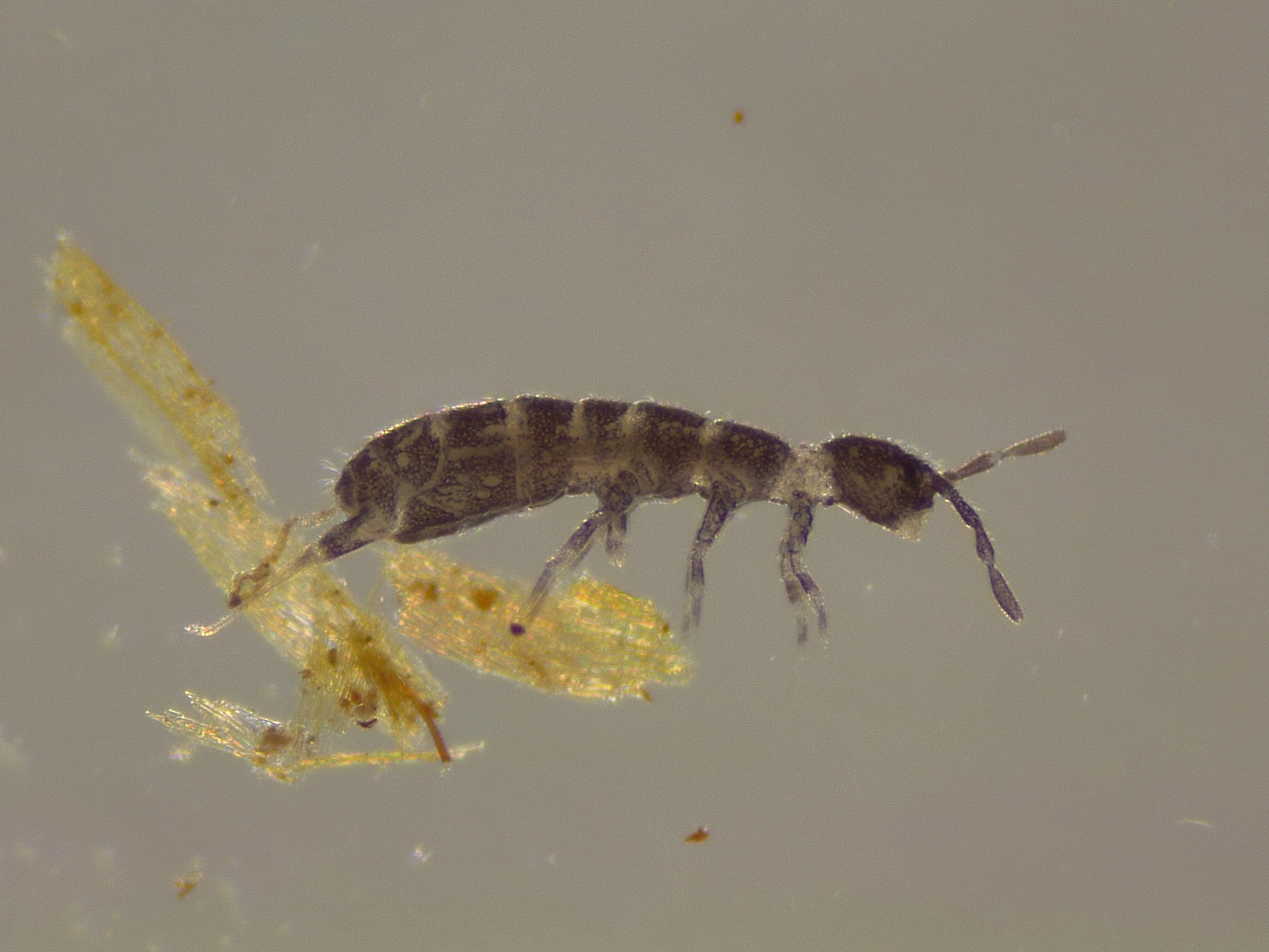
