= Pseudosorensia atlantica =

Scientific classification
- Domain: Eukaryota
- Kingdom: Animalia
- Phylum: Arthropoda
- Class: Collembola
- Order: Entomobryomorpha
- Family: Isotomidae
- Genus: Pseudosorensia
- Species: P. atlantica

Binomial name
- Pseudosorensia atlantica (Wise, 1970)

Synonyms
- Isotoma atlantica; Isotoma (Pseudosorensia) atlantica; Sorensia atlantica Wise, 1970

Species of springtail

Pseudosorensia atlantica is a species of springtail belonging to the family Isotomidae. The species was first described by Keith Arthur John Wise in 1970, and is found in South Georgia.

== Taxonomy ==
The species was first described as Sorensia atlantica in 1970 by Keith Arthur John Wise, based on a holotype collected from South Georgia in 1961 held at the Bishop Museum, along with numerous paratypes. The species was recombined and placed in the genus Pseudosorensia by Dora Esther Cutini de Izarra in 1972.

In 1986, new records of the species were made on Macquarie Island. These specimens were subsequently described as a new species and genus, Azoritoma macquariensis, in 2008.

== Description ==
Pseudosorensia atlantica is cream-coloured, with a blue-gray pigmented pattern. Specimens have a body length of 1.1 mm (0.043 in).

== Distribution and habitat ==
The species is found on moss on South Georgia island. The species is widespread across the island, found in both wet and dry environments on the surface or within top layers of soil.
