= Pseudosorensia =

Scientific classification
- Domain: Eukaryota
- Kingdom: Animalia
- Phylum: Arthropoda
- Class: Collembola
- Order: Entomobryomorpha
- Family: Isotomidae
- Subfamily: Isotominae
- Genus: Pseudosorensia; D.C.de Izarra, 1972

Species
- See text

Genus of springtails

Pseudosorensia is a genus of springtails belonging to the family Isotomidae. The genus was first recognised by Dora Esther Cutini de Izarra in 1972.

== Species ==
- Pseudosorensia atlantica (Wise, 1970)
- Pseudosorensia fueguensis D.C.de Izarra, 1972
- Pseudosorensia subcaeca Deharveng, 1981

== Distribution ==
The genus is found in South America, as well as Antarctica and the subantarctic islands.
