= Isotomurus bimus =

Scientific classification
- Kingdom: Animalia
- Phylum: Arthropoda
- Class: Collembola
- Order: Entomobryomorpha
- Family: Isotomidae
- Genus: Isotomurus
- Species: I. bimus

Binomial name
- Isotomurus bimus Christiansen & Bellinger, 1980

Species of springtail

Isotomurus bimus is a species of elongate-bodied springtails in the family Isotomidae.
