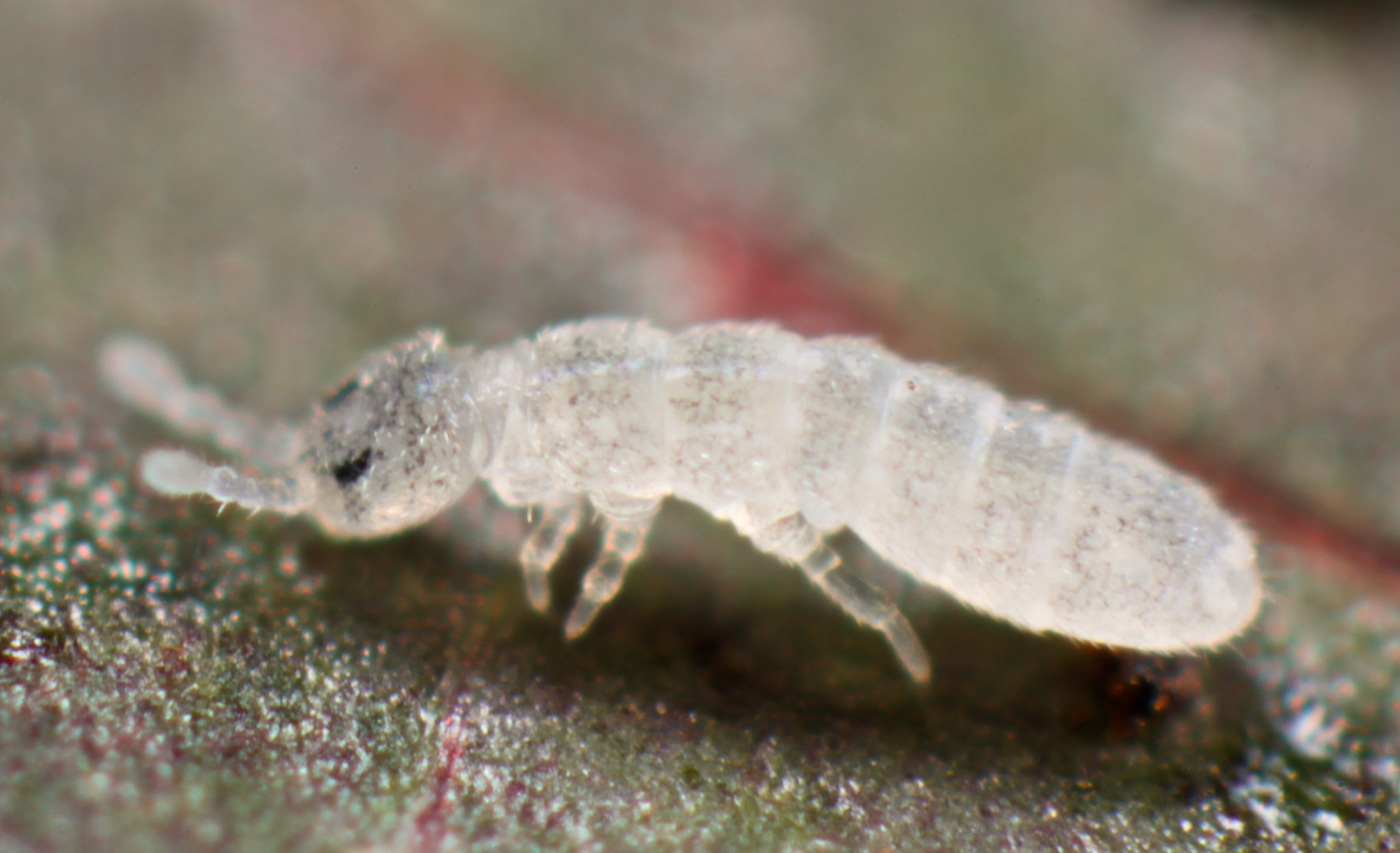
- Proisotoma minuta

Scientific classification
- Domain: Eukaryota
- Kingdom: Animalia
- Phylum: Arthropoda
- Class: Collembola
- Order: Entomobryomorpha
- Family: Isotomidae
- Subfamily: Proisotominae
- Genus: Proisotoma; Börner, 1901

Synonyms
- Isotomina Börner, 1903

= Proisotoma =

Genus of springtails

Proisotoma is a genus of elongate-bodied springtails in the family Isotomidae. There are at least 50 described species in Proisotoma.

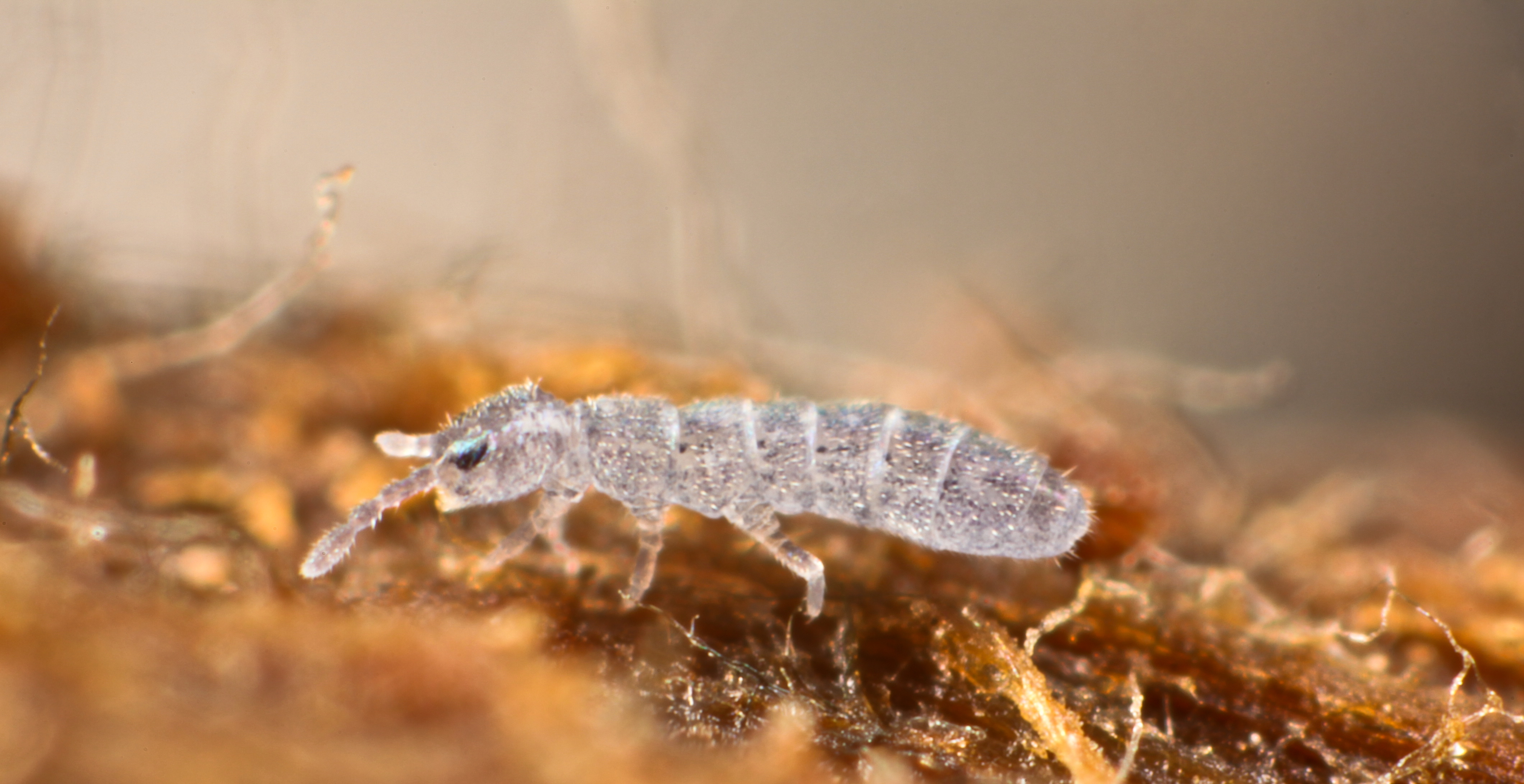
Proisotoma minuta

== Species ==
These 50 species belong to the genus Proisotoma:

- Proisotoma aera Christiansen & Bellinger, 1980
- Proisotoma alpa Christiansen & Bellinger, 1980
- Proisotoma ananevae Babenko & Bulavintsev, 1993
- Proisotoma anopolitana Schulz & Lymberakis, 2006
- Proisotoma antigua (Folsom, 1937)
- Proisotoma bayouensis Mills, 1931
- Proisotoma beta Christiansen & Bellinger, 1980
- Proisotoma buddenrocki Stenkzke, 1954
- Proisotoma bulba Christiansen & Bellinger, 1980
- Proisotoma bulbosa Folsom, 1937
- Proisotoma clavipila Axelson, 1903
- Proisotoma coeca da Gama, 1961
- Proisotoma communis Sánchez-García & Engel, 2016
- Proisotoma crassicauda (Tullberg, 1871)
- Proisotoma dualis
- Proisotoma dubia Christiansen & Bellinger, 1980
- Proisotoma ewingi James, 1933
- Proisotoma excavata Folsom, 1937
- Proisotoma extra Christiansen & Bellinger, 1980
- Proisotoma frisoni Folson, 1937
- Proisotoma fungi Selga, 1962
- Proisotoma immersa (Folsom, 1937)
- Proisotoma juaniae Lucianez & Simon, 1992
- Proisotoma laticauda Folsom, 1937
- Proisotoma libra Christiansen & Bellinger, 1980
- Proisotoma longispina MacGillivray
- Proisotoma macgillivaryi (Della Torre, 1895)
- Proisotoma mackenziana Hammar, 1952
- Proisotoma minima (Absolon, 1901)
- Proisotoma minuta (Tullberg, 1871)
- Proisotoma muskegis (Guthrie, 1903)
- Proisotoma najtae Selga, 1971
- Proisotoma nova Palissa, 1969
- Proisotoma obsoleta (Macgillivray, 1896)
- Proisotoma papillosa Stach, 1947
- Proisotoma rainieri Folsom, 1937
- Proisotoma ramosi Arle, 1959
- Proisotoma ripicola Linnaniemi, 1912
- Proisotoma schoetti (Dalla Torre, 1895)
- Proisotoma sepulchralis (Folsom, 1902)
- Proisotoma subminuta Denis, 1931
- Proisotoma tenella (Reuter, 1895)
- Proisotoma titusi Folsom, 1937
- Proisotoma turberculatum Stach, 1947
- Proisotoma veca (Wray, 1952)
- Proisotoma vernoga (Wray, 1958)
- Proisotoma vesiculata Folsom, 1937
- Proisotoma vetusta (Folson, 1937)
- Proisotoma woodi Christiansen & Bellinger, 1980
- † Proisotoma pettersonae Christiansen & Nascimbene, 2006
