= Anurophorus =

- Anurophorus laricis

Scientific classification
- Kingdom: Animalia
- Phylum: Arthropoda
- Clade: Pancrustacea
- Class: Collembola
- Order: Entomobryomorpha
- Family: Isotomidae
- Subfamily: Anurophorinae
- Genus: Anurophorus; Nicolet, 1841

Genus of springtails

Anurophorus is a genus of springtails in the family Isotomidae. Species of the genus are found in Europe and North America.

== Species ==
The following species are recognised in the genus Anurophorus.

- Anurophorus alpinus
- Anurophorus altus
- Anurophorus asfouri
- Anurophorus atlanticus
- Anurophorus balcellsi
- Anurophorus barroudensis
- Anurophorus bimus
- Anurophorus certus
- Anurophorus changjiensis
- Anurophorus chukoticus
- Anurophorus cinereus
- Anurophorus coiffaiti
- Anurophorus continentalis
- Anurophorus cuspidatus
- Anurophorus dubius
- Anurophorus duodecimoculatus
- Anurophorus elongatus
- Anurophorus eximius
- Anurophorus fjellbergi
- Anurophorus fulvus
- Anurophorus ganghwaensis
- Anurophorus hallaensis
- Anurophorus konseli
- Anurophorus koreanus
- Anurophorus laricis
- Anurophorus lohi
- Anurophorus lydiae
- Anurophorus massoudi
- Anurophorus mongolicus
- Anurophorus montanus
- Anurophorus nitrophilus
- Anurophorus olympicus
- Anurophorus oredonensis
- Anurophorus orientalis
- Anurophorus pacificus
- Anurophorus palearcticus
- Anurophorus pannosus
- Anurophorus pseudolaricis
- Anurophorus racovitzai
- Anurophorus rarus
- Anurophorus satchelli
- Anurophorus scheueri
- Anurophorus senex
- Anurophorus sensibilis
- Anurophorus septentrionalis
- Anurophorus serratus
- Anurophorus silvaticus
- Anurophorus sorosi
- Anurophorus spinosus
- Anurophorus stepposus
- Anurophorus szeptyckii
- Anurophorus trisensillus
- Anurophorus unguiculus
- Anurophorus ursi
- Anurophorus utahensis
- BOLD:AEG8011
