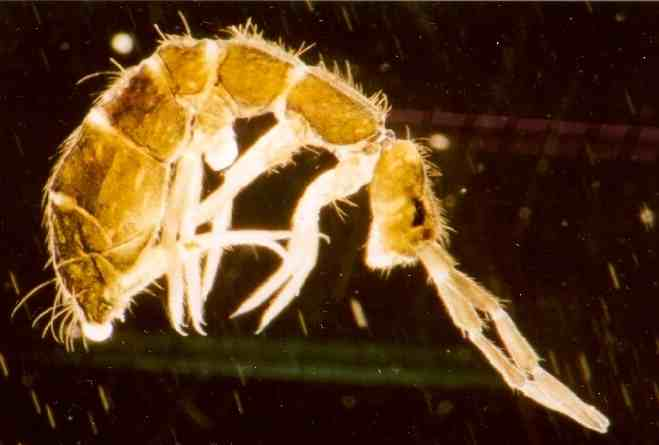

Scientific classification
- Kingdom: Animalia
- Phylum: Arthropoda
- Clade: Pancrustacea
- Class: Collembola
- Order: Entomobryomorpha
- Family: Isotomidae
- Genus: Isotoma
- Species: I. anglicana

Binomial name
- Isotoma anglicana (Lubbock, 1862)

= Isotoma anglicana =

Species of springtail

Isotoma anglicana is a species of springtail of the family Isotomidae described by Lubbock in 1862.
