= Isotomodes =

Scientific classification
- Domain: Eukaryota
- Kingdom: Animalia
- Phylum: Arthropoda
- Class: Collembola
- Order: Entomobryomorpha
- Family: Isotomidae
- Genus: Isotomodes

Genus of springtails

Isotomodes is a genus of arthropods belonging to the family Isotomidae.

The species of this genus are found in Europe and America.

Species:

- Isotomodes alavensis Simòn et al., 1994
- Isotomodes alexius Palacios-Vargas & Kovàc, 1995
