= Antarcticinella =

Antarcticinella monoculata

Scientific classification
- Kingdom: Animalia
- Phylum: Arthropoda
- Clade: Pancrustacea
- Class: Collembola
- Order: Entomobryomorpha
- Family: Isotomidae
- Genus: Antarcticinella; Salmon, 1965
- Species: A. monoculata

Binomial name
- Antarcticinella monoculata Salmon, 1965

Genus of springtails

Antarcticinella is a genus of springtails native to Antarctica. It is monotypic, being represented by the single species Antarcticinella monoculata. The genus and species were original described by John Salmon in 1965.

== Distribution and habitat ==
Antarcticinella monoculata can be found on the coast of Antarctica and the ocean surrounding it, such as the Southern Ocean (also known as the Antarctic ocean).
