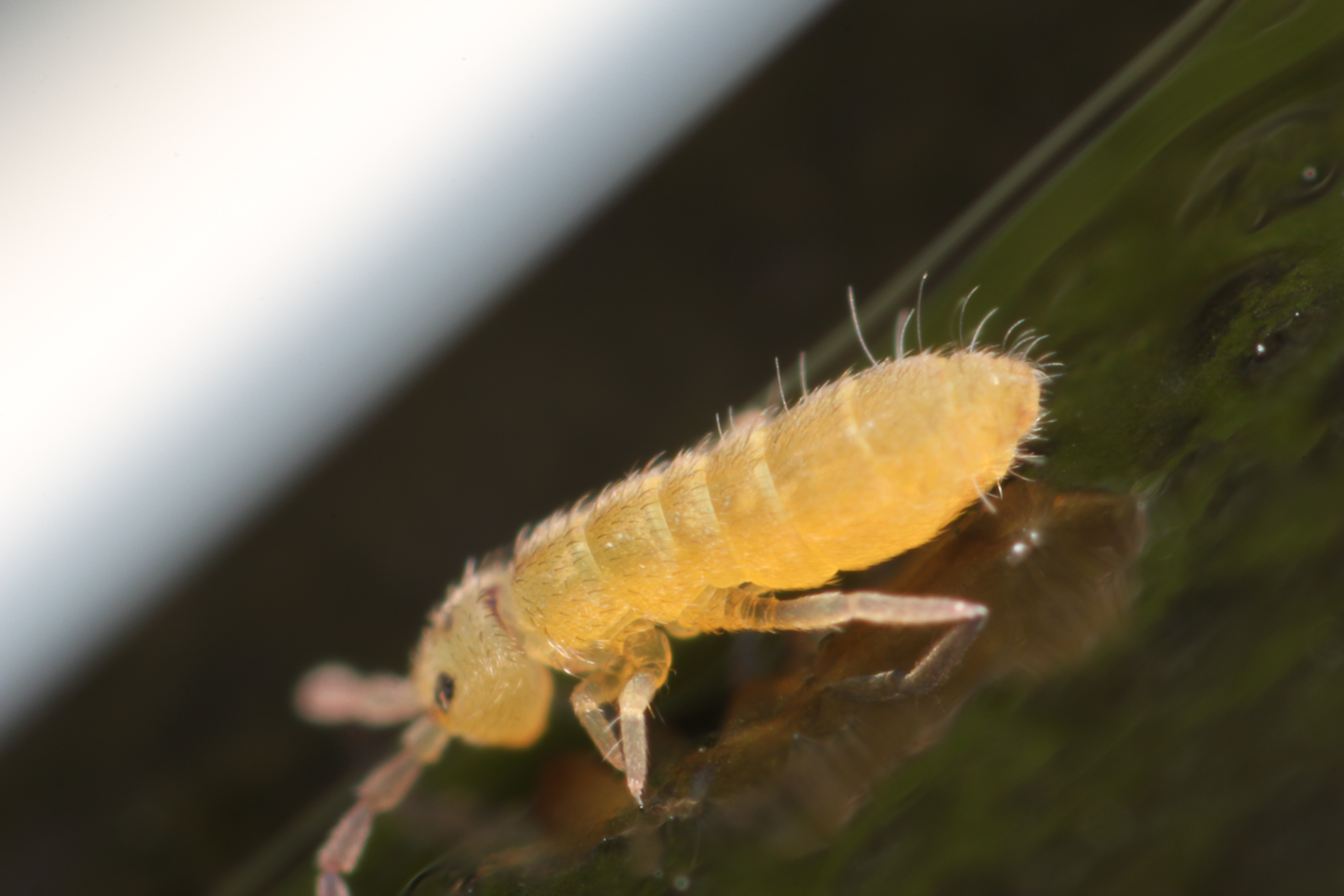
- Isotomurus fucicolus

Scientific classification
- Domain: Eukaryota
- Kingdom: Animalia
- Phylum: Arthropoda
- Class: Collembola
- Order: Entomobryomorpha
- Family: Isotomidae
- Subfamily: Isotominae
- Genus: Isotomurus; Boerner, 1903

= Isotomurus =

Genus of springtails

Isotomurus is a genus of elongate-bodied springtails in the family Isotomidae. There are at least 40 described species in Isotomurus.

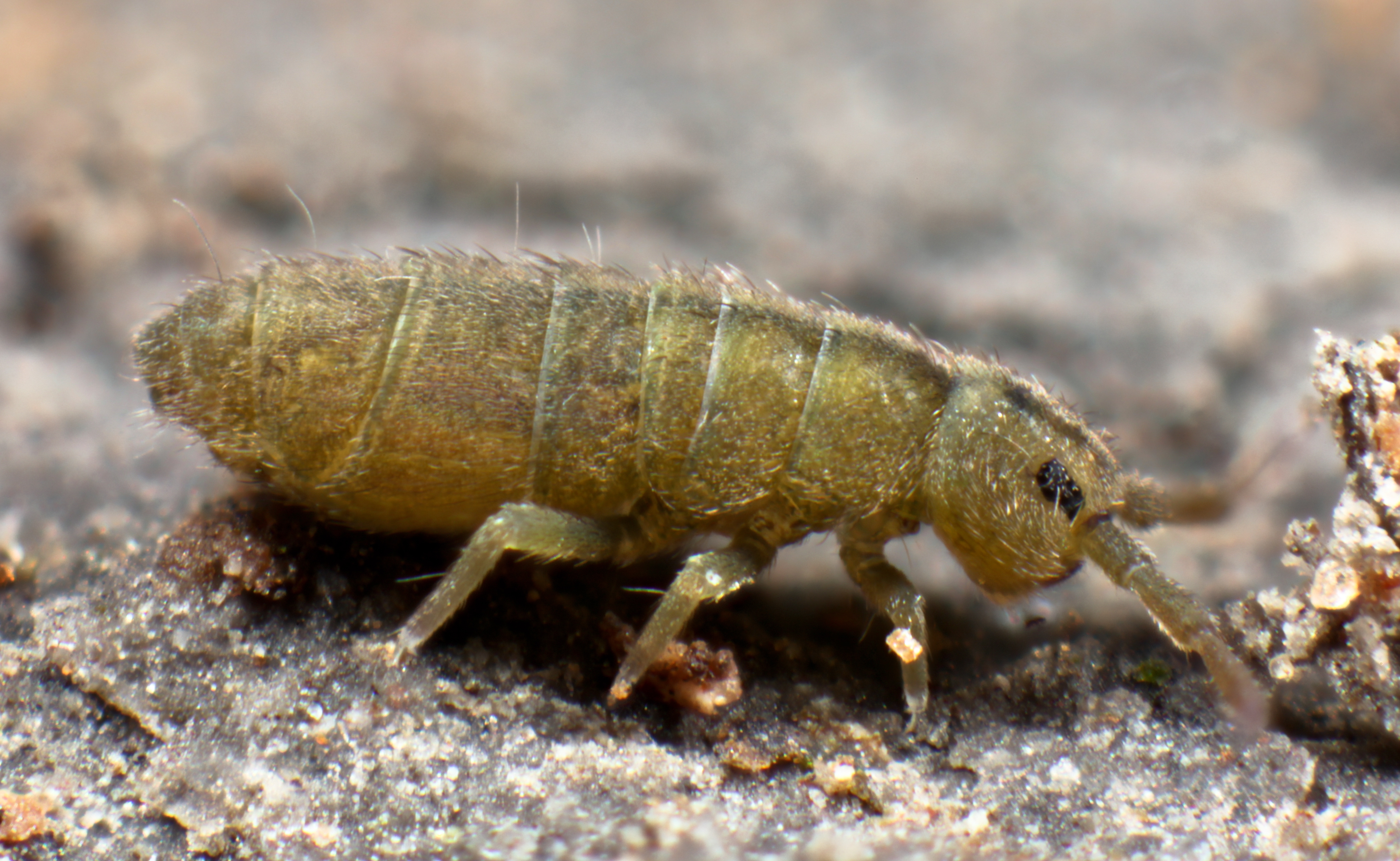
Isotomurus palustris

== Species ==
These 40 species belong to the genus Isotomurus:

- Isotomurus aequalis (Macgillivray, 1896)
- Isotomurus aetnensis Carapelli, Frati, Fanciulli & Dallai, 2001
- Isotomurus alticolus (Carl, 1899)
- Isotomurus annectens Yosii, 1963
- Isotomurus atreus Christiansen & Bellinger, 1980
- Isotomurus balteatus (Reuter, 1876)
- Isotomurus beskidensis Rusek, 1963
- Isotomurus bidenticulata Tullberg, 1976
- Isotomurus bimus Christiansen & Bellinger, 1980
- Isotomurus cassagnaui Deharveng & Lek, 1993
- Isotomurus catalana Cassagnau, 1987
- Isotomurus cibus Christiansen & Bellinger, 1980
- Isotomurus denticulatus Kos, 1937
- Isotomurus festus Potapov, Porco & Deharveng, 2018
- Isotomurus fucicola (Schött, 1893)
- Isotomurus fucicolus (Reuter, 1891)
- Isotomurus gallicus Carapelli & al., 2001
- Isotomurus ghibellinus Carapelli, Frati, Fanciulli & Dallai, 1995
- Isotomurus graminis Fjellberg, 2007
- Isotomurus hadriaticus Carapelli, Frati, Fanciulli & Dallai, 2001
- Isotomurus italicus Carapelli & al., 1995
- Isotomurus keilbachi Palissa, 1969
- Isotomurus lateclavus Kos, 1937
- Isotomurus maculatus (Schaeffer, 1896)
- Isotomurus nebulosus Lek & Carapelli, 1998
- Isotomurus opala Christiansen & Bellinger, 1992
- Isotomurus palliceps (Uzel, 1891)
- Isotomurus palustris (Müller, 1776) (marsh springtail)
- Isotomurus palustroides Folsom, 1937
- Isotomurus plumosus Bagnall, 1940
- Isotomurus pseudopalustris Carapelli, Frati, Fanciulli & Dallai, 2001
- Isotomurus rabili Deharveng & Lek, 1993
- Isotomurus retardatus Folsom, 1937
- Isotomurus schaefferi (Krausbauer, 1947)
- Isotomurus stuxbergi (Tullberg, 1876)
- Isotomurus subterraneus Stach, 1946
- Isotomurus texensis Folsom, 1937
- Isotomurus tricolor (Packard, 1873)
- Isotomurus unifasciatus (Börner, 1901)
- Isotomurus viridipalustris Kos, 1937
