= Isotomiella =

Scientific classification
- Domain: Eukaryota
- Kingdom: Animalia
- Phylum: Arthropoda
- Class: Collembola
- Order: Entomobryomorpha
- Family: Isotomidae
- Subfamily: Isotominae
- Genus: Isotomiella; Bagnall, 1939

Synonyms (non Hübner, 1825: preoccupied)
- Denisia Folsom, 1932

Genus of arthropods

Isotomiella is a genus of springtails (Collembola) in the family Isotomidae.

== Species ==
- Isotomiella alulu Christiansen & Bellinger, 1992
- Isotomiella aluluminor Yoshii, 1995
- Isotomiella amazonica Oliveira & Deharveng, 1990
- Isotomiella annae Deharveng & Suhardjono, 1994
- Isotomiella arlei Oliveira & Deharveng, 1990
- Isotomiella barisan Deharveng & Suhardjono, 1994
- Isotomiella barivierai Deharveng, 1989
- Isotomiella barrai Deharveng & Oliveira, 1990
- Isotomiella barrana Mendonça & Abrantes, 2007
- Isotomiella bidentata Delamare Deboutteville, 1950
- Isotomiella brevidens Bedos & Deharveng, 1994
- Isotomiella canina Mendonça & Fernandes, 2003
- Isotomiella ciliata Cardoso, 1969
- Isotomiella cribrata Deharveng & Suhardjono, 1994
- Isotomiella deforestai Deharveng & Suhardjono, 1994
- Isotomiella delamarei Barra, 1968
- Isotomiella digitata Deharveng & Oliveira, 1990
- Isotomiella distincta Mendonça & Fernandes, 2003
- Isotomiella dubia Deharveng & Suhardjono, 1994
- Isotomiella dupliseta Deharveng & Oliveira, 1990
- Isotomiella edaphica Bedos & Deharveng, 1994
- Isotomiella falcata Mendonça & Fernandes, 2003
- Isotomiella fellina Mendonça & Fernandes, 2003
- Isotomiella gracilimucronata Rusek, 1981
- Isotomiella granulata Oliveira & Deharveng, 1990
- Isotomiella hirsuta Bedos & Deharveng, 1994
- Isotomiella hygrophila Sterzyńska & Kapruś’, 2001
- Isotomiella insulae Barra, 2006
- Isotomiella inthanonensis Bedos & Deharveng, 1994
- Isotomiella leksawasdii Bedos & Deharveng, 1994
- Isotomiella madeirensis Gama, 1959
- Isotomiella michonae Deharveng & Suhardjono, 1994
- Isotomiella minor (Schäffer, 1896)
- Isotomiella muscorum (Schäffer, 1900)
- Isotomiella nummulifer Deharveng & Oliveira, 1990
- Isotomiella paraminor Gisin, 1942
- Isotomiella proxima Mendonça & Fernandes, 2003
- Isotomiella quadriseta Deharveng & Oliveira, 1990
- Isotomiella sensillata Oliveira & Deharveng, 1990
- Isotomiella similis Oliveira & Deharveng, 1990
- Isotomiella sodwana Barra, 1997
- Isotomiella spinifer Deharveng & Oliveira, 1990
- Isotomiella spinosa Deharveng & Fjellberg, 1993
- Isotomiella symetrimucronata Najt & Thibaud, 1987
- Isotomiella thiollayi Deharveng & Suhardjono, 1994
- Isotomiella unguiculata Deharveng, 1989
