= Metisotoma =

Scientific classification
- Domain: Eukaryota
- Kingdom: Animalia
- Phylum: Arthropoda
- Class: Collembola
- Order: Entomobryomorpha
- Family: Isotomidae
- Subfamily: Isotominae
- Genus: Metisotoma; Maynard, 1951

Genus of springtails

Metisotoma is a genus of elongate-bodied springtails in the family Isotomidae. There are at least two described species in Metisotoma.

== Species ==
These two species belong to the genus Metisotoma:

- Metisotoma grandiceps (Reuter, 1891)
- Metisotoma spiniseta Maynard, 1951
