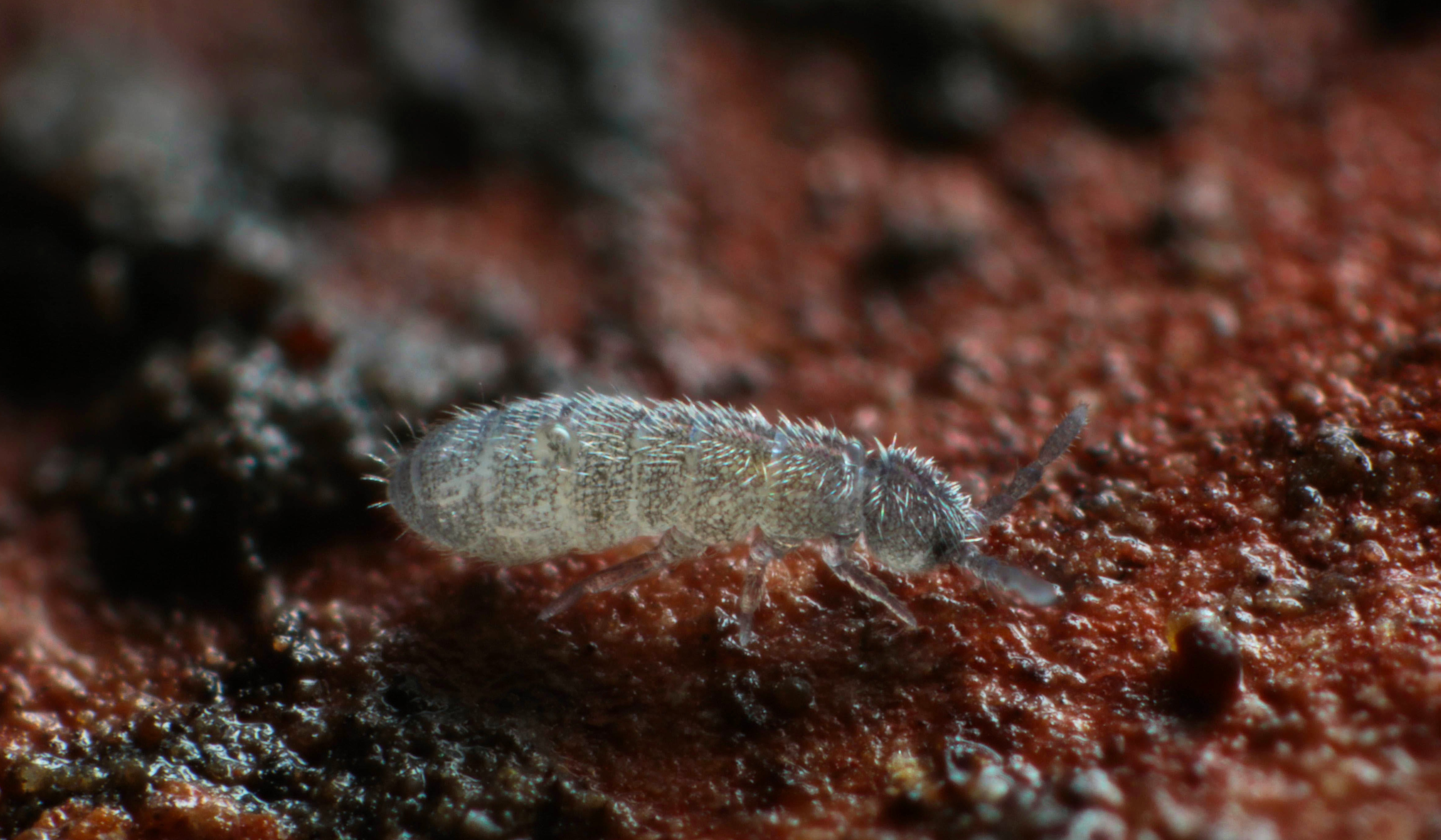
- Parisotoma notabilis

Scientific classification
- Domain: Eukaryota
- Kingdom: Animalia
- Phylum: Arthropoda
- Class: Collembola
- Order: Entomobryomorpha
- Family: Isotomidae
- Subfamily: Isotominae
- Genus: Parisotoma; Bagnall, 1940

= Parisotoma =

Genus of springtails

Parisotoma is a genus of elongate-bodied springtails in the family Isotomidae. There are about 11 described species in Parisotoma.

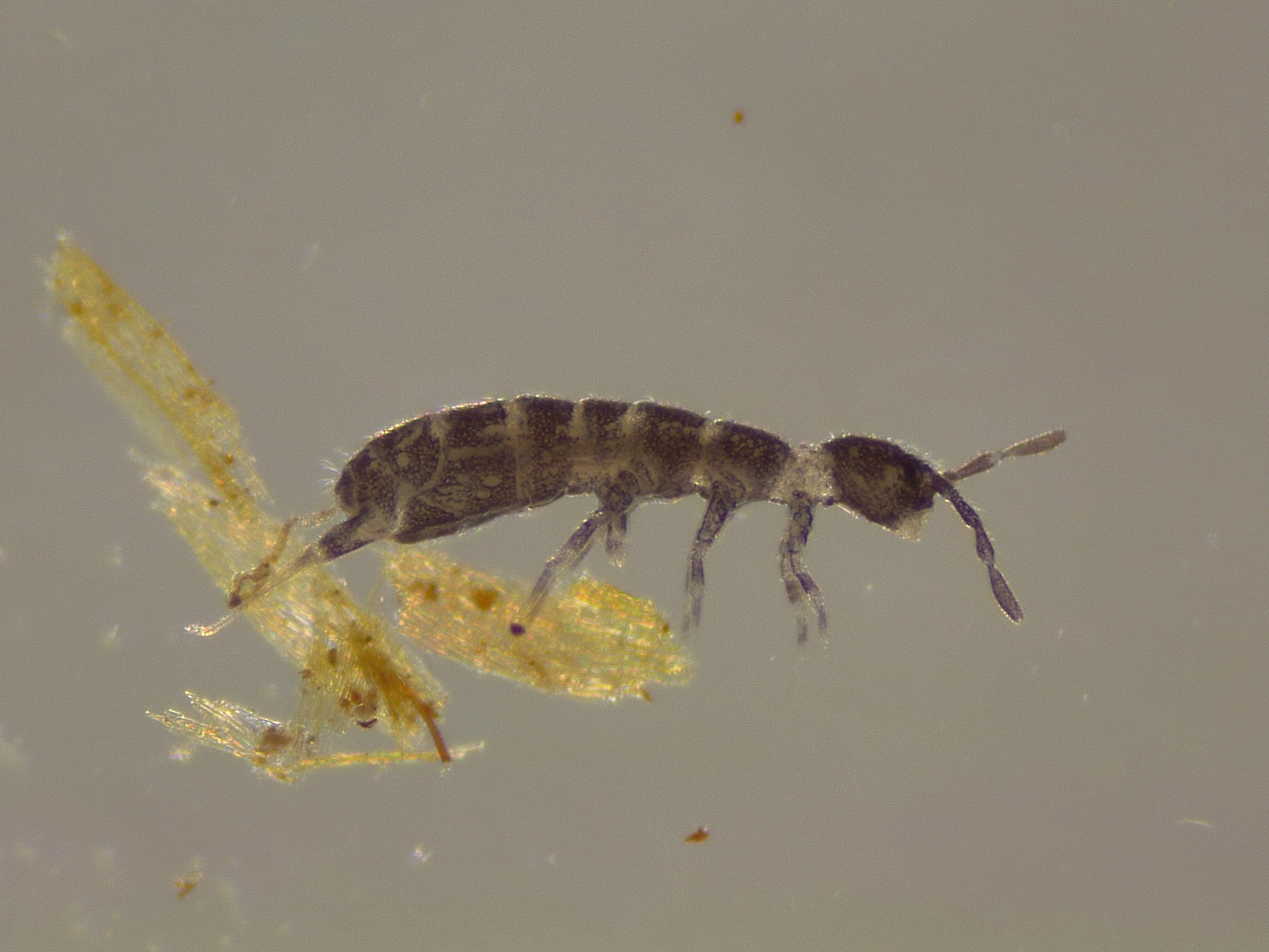
Parisotoma notabilis

== Species ==
These 11 species belong to the genus Parisotoma:

- Parisotoma confusoculata Salmon, 1944^{c g}
- Parisotoma dichaeta Yosii, 1969^{g}
- Parisotoma dividua Salmon, 1944^{c g}
- Parisotoma notabilis (Schäffer, 1896)^{c b}
- Parisotoma obscurocellata^{g}
- Parisotoma picea Salmon, 1949^{c g}
- Parisotoma postantennala Salmon, 1949^{c g}
- Parisotoma quinquedentata Salmon, 1943^{c g}
- Parisotoma reducta (Rusek, 1984)^{g}
- Parisotoma sexsetosa^{g}
- Parisotoma trichaetosa (Martynova, 1977)^{g}

Data sources: i = ITIS, c = Catalogue of Life, g = GBIF, b = Bugguide.net
