= Hydroisotoma schaefferi =

Scientific classification
- Kingdom: Animalia
- Phylum: Arthropoda
- Clade: Pancrustacea
- Class: Collembola
- Order: Entomobryomorpha
- Family: Isotomidae
- Genus: Hydroisotoma
- Species: H. schaefferi

Binomial name
- Hydroisotoma schaefferi (Krausbauer, 1898)

Species of springtail

Hydroisotoma schaefferi is a springtail native to the eastern US.
