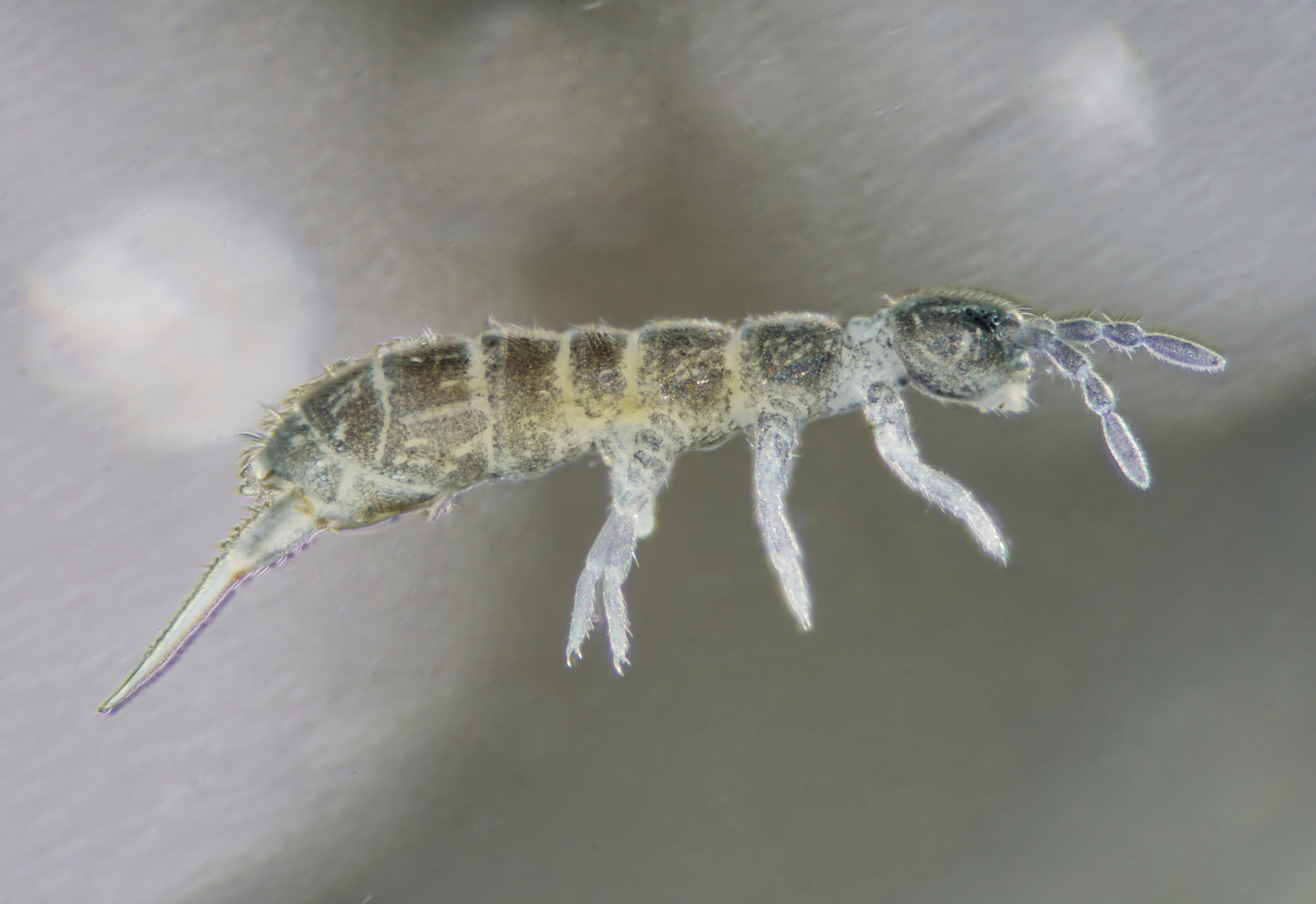
- Desoria sp.

Scientific classification
- Domain: Eukaryota
- Kingdom: Animalia
- Phylum: Arthropoda
- Class: Collembola
- Order: Entomobryomorpha
- Family: Isotomidae
- Genus: Desoria; Agassiz & Nicolet (in Desor, 1841)

Species
- Several, including: D. elegans (Carl, J, 1899); D. saltans Nicolet, 1841

= Desoria =

Genus of springtails

Desoria is a genus of springtails.
