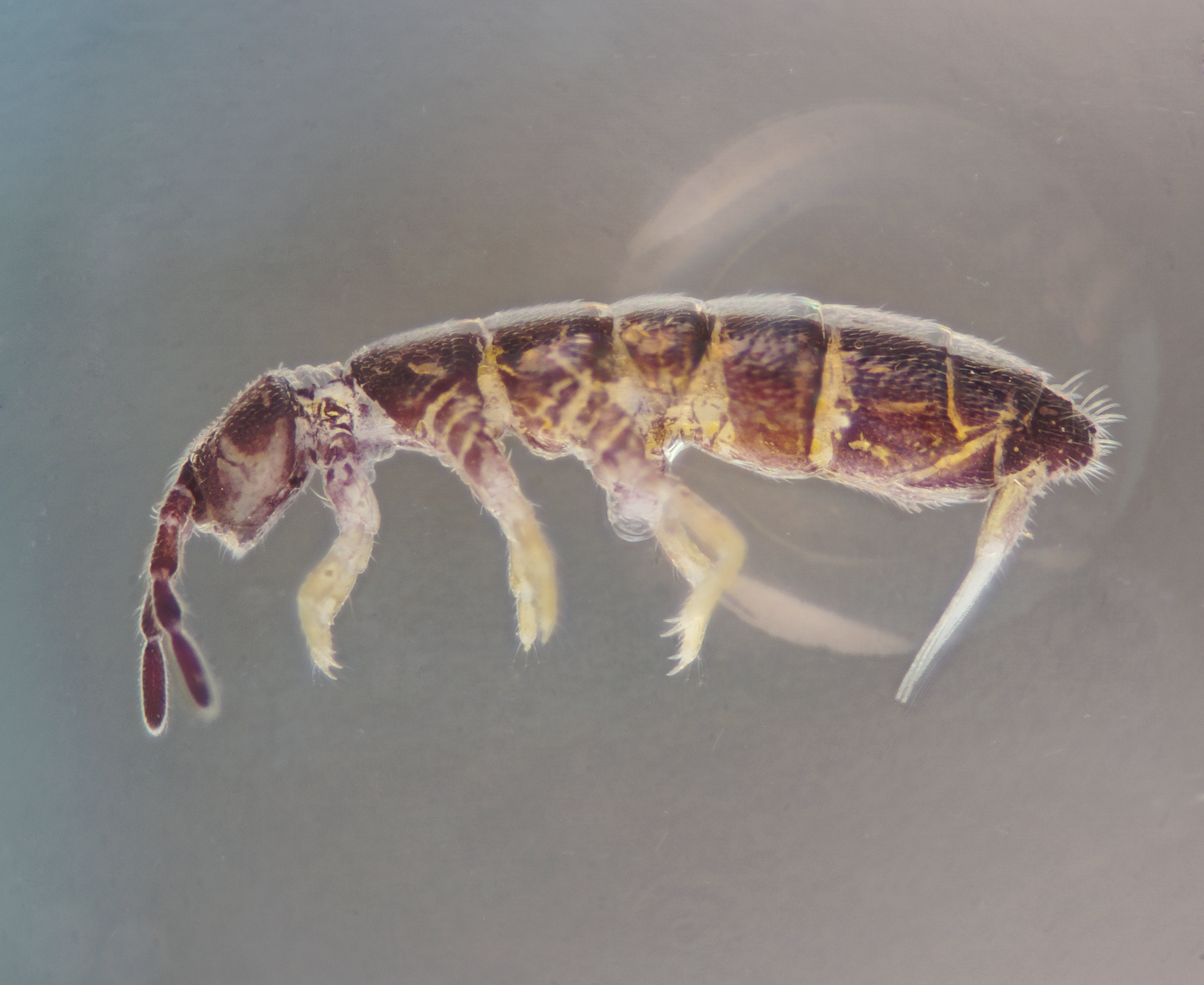
- Vertagopus arboreus

Scientific classification
- Kingdom: Animalia
- Phylum: Arthropoda
- Class: Collembola
- Order: Entomobryomorpha
- Family: Isotomidae
- Genus: Vertagopus; Bagnall, 1939

= Vertagopus =

Genus of collembola

Vertagopus is a genus of springtails belonging to the family Isotomidae.

== Species ==
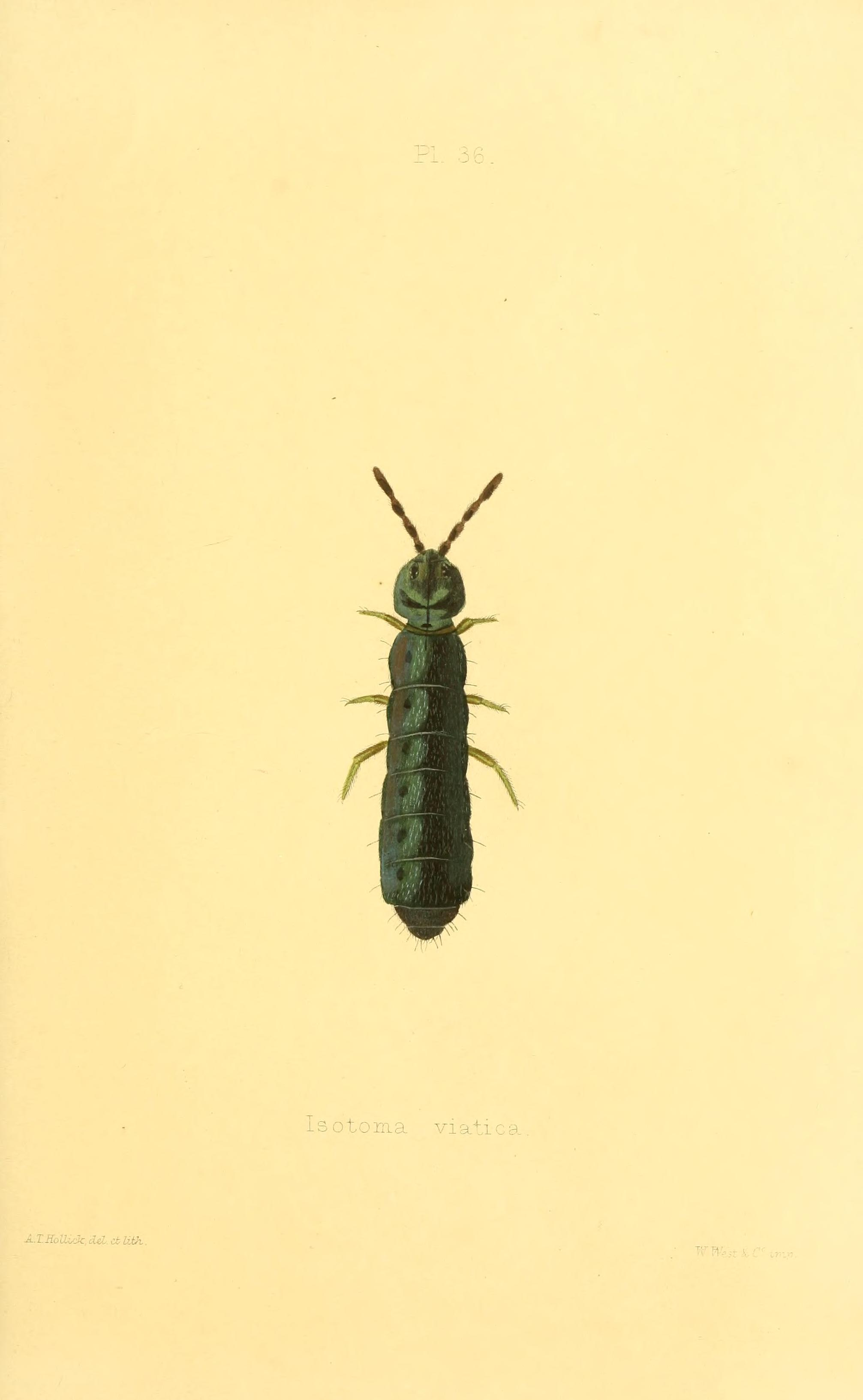
Illustration of V. asiaticus.

The following species are recognised in the genus Vertagopus:

- Vertagopus abeloosi Poinsot, 1965
- Vertagopus alpinus Haybach, 1972
- Vertagopus alpus Christiansen & Bellinger, 1980
- Vertagopus arborata Huifen & Yueling, 1993
- Vertagopus arboreus (Linnæus, C, 1758)
- Vertagopus arcticus Martynova, 1969
- Vertagopus asiaticus Potapov, M, Gulgenova, A et Babykina, M, 2016
- Vertagopus beta Christiansen & Bellinger, 1980
- Vertagopus brevicaudus (Carpenter, 1900)
- Vertagopus ceratus Potapov, M, Gulgenova, A et Babykina, M, 2016
- Vertagopus ciliatus Christiansen, K, 1958
- Vertagopus cinereus (Nicolet, H, 1842)
- Vertagopus haagvari Fjellberg, A, 1996
- Vertagopus helveticus Haybach, 1980
- Vertagopus laricis Martynova, 1975
- Vertagopus monta (Christiansen & Bellinger, 1980)
- Vertagopus montanus Stach, 1947
- Vertagopus nunataki Lafooraki, et al., 2020
- Vertagopus obscurus Wahlgren, 1906
- Vertagopus pallidus Martynova, 1974
- Vertagopus persea Wray, 1952
- Vertagopus persicus Lafooraki, et al., 2020
- Vertagopus pseudocinereus Fjellberg, 1975
- Vertagopus reuteri (Schött, H, 1893)
- Vertagopus sarekensis Poinsot, 1965
- Vertagopus tianschanicus Martynova, 1969
- Vertagopus westerlundi (Reuter, 1898)
- Vertagopus sp. 1 Fjellberg, A, 1996
- Vertagopus sp. 2 Fjellberg, A, 1996
- Vertagopus sp. 3 Janssens F & Duncan WL, 2019
