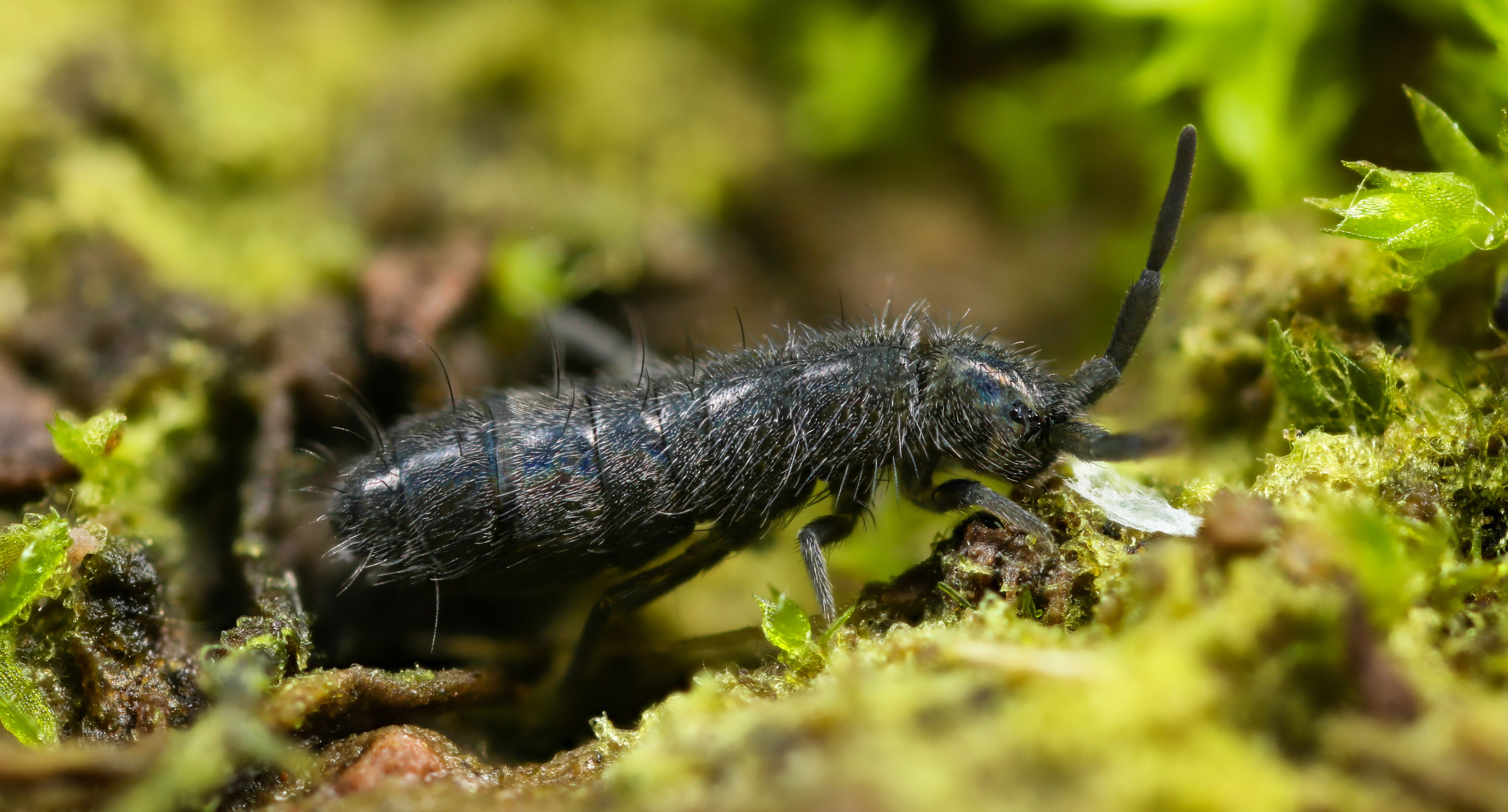
- Isotoma caerulea

Scientific classification
- Domain: Eukaryota
- Kingdom: Animalia
- Phylum: Arthropoda
- Class: Collembola
- Order: Entomobryomorpha
- Family: Isotomidae
- Subfamily: Isotominae
- Genus: Isotoma; Bourlet, 1839

= Isotoma (springtail) =

Genus of springtails

Isotoma is a common genus of springtails, the type genus of the family Isotomidae, containing the following species:

- Isotoma acrea Wray, 1953
- Isotoma agrelli Delamare, 1950
- Isotoma alaskana Christiansen & Bellinger, 1980
- Isotoma alaskensis Fjellberg, 1978
- Isotoma albella Packard, 1873
- Isotoma alpa Christiansen & Bellinger, 1980
- **Isotoma anglicana** Lubbock, 1873
- Isotoma arborea Linnaeus, 1758
- **Isotoma arctica** Schött, 1893
- Isotoma aspera Bacon, 1914
- Isotoma atkasukiensis Fjellberg, 1978
- Isotoma beta Christiansen & Bellinger, 1980
- Isotoma blufusata Fjellberg, 1978
- Isotoma brucealla Wray, 1953
- Isotoma caerulea Bourlet, 1839
- Isotoma caeruleatra Guthrie, 1903
- Isotoma canadensis Brown, 1932
- Isotoma cancellarei Christiansen & Bellinger, 1980
- Isotoma carpenteri Börner, 1909
- Isotoma christianseni Fjellberg, 1978
- Isotoma communa MacGillivray, 1896
- Isotoma creli Fjellberg, 1978
- **Isotoma decorata** (Brown, 1925)
- **Isotoma diverticulata** Yosii, 1966
- Isotoma dispar Christiansen & Bellinger, 1988
- Isotoma ekmani Fjellberg, 1977
- Isotoma fennica Reuter, 1895
- Isotoma flora Christiansen & Bellinger, 1980
- Isotoma gelida Folsom, 1937
- Isotoma glauca Packard, 1873
- **Isotoma gorodkovi** Martynova, 1970
- Isotoma hiemalis Schött, 1893
- Isotoma inupikella Fjellberg, 1978
- Isotoma japonica Yosii, 1939
- Isotoma komarkovae Fjellberg, 1978
- Isotoma longipenna MacGillivray, 1896
- Isotoma louisiana Scott, 1962
- Isotoma lucama Wray, 1952
- Isotoma macleani Fjellberg, 1978
- Isotoma manitobae Fjellberg, 1978
- Isotoma manubriata MacGillivray, 1896
- Isotoma marisca Christiansen & Bellinger, 1988
- Isotoma marissa Folsom, 1937
- Isotoma maxillosa Fjellberg, 1978
- **Isotoma melanocephala** (Börner, 1909)
- Isotoma monochaeta Kos, 1942
- Isotoma monta Christiansen & Bellinger, 1980
- Isotoma multisetis Carpenter & Phillips, 1922
- Isotoma nanseni Fjellberg, 1978
- Isotoma neglecta Schäffer, 1900
- **Isotoma nepalica** (Yosii, 1966)
- Isotoma nigrifrons Folsom, 1937
- **Isotoma nishihirai** Yosii, 1965
- Isotoma nixoni Fjellberg, 1978
- Isotoma notabilis Schäffer, 1896
- Isotoma nympha Snider & Calandrino, 1987
- Isotoma persea Wray, 1952
- **Isotoma pinnata** Börner, 1909
- Isotoma propinqua Axelson, 1902
- Isotoma pseudocinerea Fjellberg, 1975
- Isotoma quadra Christiansen & Bellinger, 1980
- Isotoma randiella Fjellberg, 1978
- **Isotoma riparia** (Nicolet, 1842)
- Isotoma sandersoni Wray, 1952
- Isotoma sensibilis Tullberg, 1876
- Isotoma spatulata Chamberlain, 1943
- Isotoma speciosa MacGillivray, 1896
- Isotoma sphagneticola Linnaniemi, 1912
- **Isotoma spinicauda** (Bonet, 1930)
- Isotoma subaequalis Folsom, 1937
- Isotoma subviridis Folsom, 1937
- Isotoma taigicola Fjellberg, 1978
- Isotoma tariva Wray, 1953
- Isotoma tigrina Nicolet, 1842
- Isotoma torildae Fjellberg, 1978
- Isotoma tridentata MacGillivray, 1896
- Isotoma trispinata MacGillivray, 1896
- Isotoma tuckeri Christiansen & Bellinger, 1980
- Isotoma tunica Christiansen & Bellinger, 1980
- Isotoma uniens Christiansen & Bellinger, 1980
- **Isotoma variodentata** Dunger, 1982
- **Isotoma virgata** Yosii, 1963
- **Isotoma viridis** Bourlet, 1839
- Isotoma walkerii Packard, 1871

More recent study meanwhile assigns many of these taxa to other genera than Isotoma, e. g. Desoria, Parisotoma, or Vertagopus. Potapov (2001) lists 14 valid Isotoma species for the Palearctic realm, these are in bold in the list above. The most common species in Central Europe are Isotoma viridis, which dwells natural as well as disturbed habitats, while I. caerulea prefers dryer habitats, I. anglicana cooler climates, and I. riparia streambanks and coastal shorelines.
