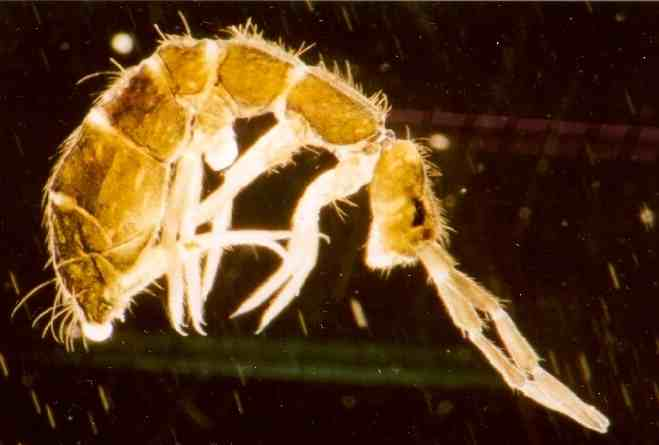
- Isotoma anglicana Lubbock, 1873

Scientific classification
- Domain: Eukaryota
- Kingdom: Animalia
- Phylum: Arthropoda
- Class: Collembola
- Order: Entomobryomorpha
- Family: Isotomidae; Schäffer, 1896

= Isotomidae =

Family of springtails

Isotomidae is a family of elongate-bodied springtails in the order Entomobryomorpha.

== Genera ==
These 109 genera belong to the family Isotomidae:

- Aackia Yosii, 1966
- Acanthomurus Womersley, 1934^{c g}
- Aggressopygus Potapov & Babenko, 2014^{g}
- Agrenia Boerner, 1906^{i g b}
- Antarcticinella Salmon, 1965^{g}
- Antarctophorus Potapov, 1992^{i c g}
- Anurophorus Nicolet, 1842^{i c g b}
- Appendisotoma Stach, 1947^{g}
- Araucanocyrtus Massoud & Rapoport, 1968
- Archisotoma Linnaniemi, 1912^{i c g}
- Arlea Womersley, 1939
- Axelsonia Boener, 1906^{i c g}
- Ballistura Börner, 1906^{c g b}
- Biacantha Martynova, 1971^{g}
- Blissia Rusek, 1985^{i c g}
- Bonetrura Christiansen and Bellinger, 1980^{i c g}
- Burmisotoma Christiansen & Nascimbene, 2006^{g}
- Coloburella Latzel, 1918^{i c g}
- Cryptopygus Willem, 1901^{i c g}
- Cylindropygus Deharveng, Potapov & Bedos, 2005^{i c g}
- Dagamaea Yosii, 1965^{b}
- Degamaea Yosii, 1965^{i c g}
- Desoria Agassiz & Nicolet, 1841^{c g b}
- Dimorphacanthella Potapov, Bu, Huang, Gao & Luan, 2010^{g}
- Dimorphotoma Grinbergs, 1975^{g}
- Ephemerotoma ^{g}
- Folsomia Willem, 1902^{i c g b}
- Folsomides Stach, 1922^{i c g}
- Folsomina Denis, 1931^{i c g}
- Folsomotoma ^{c g}
- Gnathisotoma Cassagnau, 1957^{g}
- Gnathofolsomia Deharveng & Christian, 1984^{g}
- Gressittacantha Wise, 1967^{i c g}
- Guthriella Börner, 1906^{g b}
- Halisotoma ^{c g}
- Haploisotoma Izarra, 1965^{i c g}
- Hemisotoma Bagnall, 1949^{i c g}
- Heteroisotoma Stach, 1947^{g}
- Hydroisotoma Stach, 1947^{g b}
- Isotoma Bourlet, 1839^{i c g b}
- IsotomediaSalmon, 1944^{c g}
- Isotomiella Bagnall, 1939^{i c g b}
- Isotomina ^{g}
- Isotomodella Martynova, 1968^{i c g}
- Isotomodes Axelson, 1907^{i c g}
- Isotomurus Boerner, 1903^{i c g b}
- Isotopenola Potapov, Babenko, Fjellberg & Greenslade, 2009^{g}
- Jesenikia Rusek, 1997^{i c g}
- Jestella Najt, 1978
- Kaylathalia Stevens & D'Haese, 2016^{g}
- Marisotoma Fjellberg, 1997^{g}
- Martynovella Deharveng, 1978^{g}
- Metisotoma Maynard, 1951^{i c g b}
- Micranurophorus Bernard, 1977^{i c g}
- Micrisotoma Bellinger, 1952^{i c g}
- Millsia Womersley, 1942
- Mucracanthus Stebaeva, 1976
- Mucronia Fjellberg^{g}
- Mucrosomia Bagnall, 1949^{i c g}
- Mucrotoma Rapoport & Rubio, 1963^{i c g}
- Myopia Chrisiansen & Bellinger, 1980^{g}
- Narynia Martynova, 1967^{g}
- Neocryptopygus Salmon, 1965^{i c g}
- Neophorella Womersley, 1934
- Octodontophora Chelnokov, 1990
- Pachyotoma Bagnall, 1949^{g}
- Papillomurus ^{c g}
- Paracerura Deharveng & de Olivei, 1994^{g}
- Parafolsomia Salmon, 1949^{g}
- Parisotoma Bagnall, 1940^{c g b}
- Pectenisotoma Gruia, 1983^{i c g}
- Pentacanthella Deharveng, 1979
- ProceruraSalmon, 1941^{c g}
- Proctostephanus Börner, 1902^{i c g}
- Proisotoma Börner, 1901^{i c g b}
- Proisotomurus ^{c g}
- Propachyotoma Christiansen & Nascimbene, 2006^{g}
- Protodesoria Christiansen & Nascimbene, 2006^{g}
- Protoisotoma Christiansen & Pike, 2002^{g}
- Psammisotoma Greenslade & Deharveng, 1986^{g}
- Pseudanurophorus Stach, 1922^{i c g}
- Pseudisotoma Handschin, 1924^{g b}
- Pseudofolsomia Martynova, 1967^{g}
- Pteronychella Börner, 1909
- Rhodanella Salmon, 1945^{i c g}
- Sahacanthella Potapov & Stebaeva, 1994
- Salmonia Baijal, 1958
- Scutisotoma Bagnall, 1949^{g b}
- Secotomodes Potapov, 1988
- Semicerura Maynard, 1951^{i c g}
- Sericeotoma Potapov, 1991^{g}
- Setocerura Salmon, 1949^{c g}
- Sibiracanthella Potapov & Stebaeva, 1995^{i c g}
- Skadisotoma ^{g}
- SpinoceruraSalmon, 1941^{c g}
- Stachanorema Wray, 1957^{i c g}
- Strenzketoma Potapov & al., 2006^{g}
- Subisotoma ^{g}
- Tetracanthella Schött, 1891^{i c g}
- Tiancanthella Rusek, 1979
- Tibiolatra Salmon, 1941^{c g}
- Tomocerura Wahlgren, 1901^{c g}
- Tuvia Grinbergs, 1962^{i c g}
- Uzelia Absolon, 1901^{i c g}
- Vertagopus Börner, 1906^{g b}
- Villusisotoma Christiansen & Nascimbene, 2006^{g}
- Weberacantha Christiansen, 1951^{i c g}
- Womersleyella Salmon, 1944^{i c g}
- Yosiiella Hüther, 1967^{i c g}

Data sources: i = ITIS, c = Catalogue of Life, g = GBIF, b = Bugguide.net
