= Lemons (surname) =

Lemons is a surname. It may refer to:

- Abe Lemons (1922–2002), American college basketball player and coach
- Amy Lemons (born 1981), American fashion model and model advocate
- Charlie Lemons (1887–1952), English footballer
- Chris Lemons (born 1979), American soccer player
- Devin Lemons (born 1979), former American football linebacker
- Donald W. Lemons (born 1949), American Chief Justice of the Supreme Court of Virginia
- Quil Lemons (born 1997), American photographer
- Tim Lemons (born 1962), American civil engineer, politician, member of the Arkansas House of Representatives
- Tommy Lemons Jr. (born 1987), American racing driver

== See also ==
- Lemon (surname)
- Lemon (disambiguation)
- Lemmon (disambiguation)
