= Lemon (disambiguation) =

Lemon is both a tree and the fruit borne by that tree.

Lemon or Lemons may also refer to:

== Persons ==
- Lemon Andersen (born 1975), American poet, spoken word artist, and actor
- Lemon G. Hine (1832–1914), American politician and lawyer from Washington, D.C.
- Lemon (drag queen) (born 1995), Canadian drag queen
- Lemon (surname), a list of people with the surname
- Lemons (surname), a list of people with the surname

== Places ==
- Lemon, Kentucky, United States, an unincorporated community
- Lemons, Missouri, United States, a census-designated place
- Lemon Grove, California, United States, a city
- River Lemon, England, a river

== Arts and entertainment ==
=== Music ===
- The Lemons, American rock band from Seattle, Washington
- Lemons (album), an album by Ty Segall
- Lemons (EP), debut EP from Melbourne-based acoustic-folk band Woodlock
- "Lemon" (U2 song), 1993
- "Lemon" (N.E.R.D. and Rihanna song), 2017
- "Lemon" (Kenshi Yonezu song), 2018
- "Lemon", a song by Moka Only from the album Lowdown Suite 2… The Box, 2009

=== Films ===
- Lemon (1969 film), an American experimental short
- Lemon (2013 film), a Chinese romantic comedy
- Lemon (2017 film), an American comedy drama

=== Fictional characters ===
- A character in the play Aunt Dan and Lemon
- Liz Lemon, on the television series 30 Rock
- Keith Lemon portrayed by English comedian Leigh Francis (b. 1973)
- Lemon Breeland, on the television series Hart of Dixie
- Lemon Meringue, in the Strawberry Shortcake franchise
- A group of criminals led by Sir Miles Axlerod in the movie Cars 2

=== Other arts and entertainment ===
- "Lemons" (Red Dwarf), an episode of the British television series Red Dwarf
- Lemon (short story), a short story by Motojirō Kajii
- Lemon (novella), a novella by Kwon Yeo-sun
- Lemon (card game)

== Computing ==
- LEMON (C++ library)
- Lemon (parser generator)
- Lemon (developer), an American video game development company
- OntoLex-Lemon (and its predecessor Lemon) a community standard for lexicalizing ontologies and for publishing lexical data on the web

== Other uses ==
- Lemon (automobile), a defective car
- Lemon (color)
- Lemon v. Kurtzman, a U.S. Supreme Court decision
- Lemon technique, a method to determine the relative strength of thunderstorm cells
- Lemon Party or Parti Citron, a frivolous Canadian political party
- Lemon (geometry), the shape of, for example, an American football

== See also ==
- 24 Hours of LeMons, a less-than-serious series of endurance races
- Lemmon (disambiguation)
- Oranges and Lemons (disambiguation)
