= Lemmon House =

Lemmon House may refer to:

- Leander Lemmon House, built in Utah around 1901
- Bob Lemmon House, built in South Carolina around 1850
- G.E. Lemmon House, built in South Dakota in 1908

== See also ==
- Lemmon (disambiguation)
