= Lemmon =

Lemmon or Lemmons can refer to:

== People ==
- Chris Lemmon (born 1954), United States film actor and author
- Dal Millington Lemmon (1887–1958), United States federal judge
- Dan Lemmon (fl. 1990s–2010s), New Zealand visual effects supervisor
- G. E. Lemmon (1857–1945), United States cattle rancher (George Edward Lemmon)
- Gayle Tzemach Lemmon (born 1973), author of two New York Times best sellers
- George Lemmon (1932–2022), seventh Bishop of Fredericton
- Harry T. Lemmon (1930–2025), Justice of the Louisiana Supreme Court
- John Gill Lemmon (1831–1908), American botanist
- Jack Lemmon (1925–2001), United States film actor
- John Lemmon (1930–1966), English logician and philosopher
- John Lemmon (politician) (1875–1955), long serving MLA in Victoria, Australia
- Jon Lemmon (born 1984), United States athlete in soccer
- Kasi Lemmons (born 1961), United States film director and actress
- LaMar Lemmons Jr. (1936–2023), United States businessman and political figure in Michigan
- Mark Lemmon (1889–1975) was an American architect
- Mark A. Lemmon (born 1964), English-born biochemist
- Mary Ann Vial Lemmon (born 1941), United States federal judge
- Nelson Lemmon (1908–1989), Australian politician son of John Lemmon
- Robert Stell Lemmon (1885–1964), American writer and naturalist
- Sara Plummer Lemmon (1836–1923), American botanist and illustrator
- Scott R. Lemmon (born 1968), United States software programmer, author of the Proxomitron web-filtering software
- Thetis Lemmon (1907–1987), American artist and educator
- Willard Lemmon (1924–2012), American politician

== Places ==
- Lemmon, South Dakota, a small city
- Lemmon Township, Adams County, North Dakota, a defunct township
- Lemmon Valley, Nevada, a census-designated place
- Mount Lemmon, a mountain in Arizona
- North Lemmon Township, Adams County, North Dakota, a defunct township
- Lemmons, the home in north London of Kingsley Amis and his family, 1968–1976
- Lemmon House (disambiguation), various houses

== Other uses ==
- Lemmon v. New York, an 1852 New York Superior Court case that freed slaves who were brought into New York State
- Lemmon (drug), street name of the sedative methaqualone, derived from the producer Lemmon Company of Sellersville

== See also ==
- 271P/van Houten–Lemmon, a short-period comet discovered in 1966
- C/2018 C2 (Lemmon), a hyperbolic comet first observed in 2018
- C/2025 A6 (Lemmon)
- Lemon (disambiguation)
- Lemon (surname)
