= Burningham =

Burningham is a surname. Notable people with the surname include:

- John Burningham (1936–2019), English writer and illustrator
- Kim Burningham (1936–2017), American politician
