= Norman C. Deno =

American scientist (1921–2017)

- Photo of Norman C. Deno (1966)
- Born: February 15, 1921; Chicago, Illinois, U.S.
- Died: September 22, 2017 (aged 96)
- Education: University of Illinois (B.S.); University of Michigan (M.S., Ph.D.)
- Known for: Creating methods for seed germination
- Awards: Award of Merit (1978); Carleton R. Worth Award (1990)
- Scientific career
- Fields: Chemistry, horticulture

Norman C. Deno (February 15, 1921 – September 22, 2017) was an American chemist and plant scientist. He was a professor of chemistry at Penn State University and is known as one of the foremost researchers in seed germination theory. He researched the biochemical reactions that underlie the germination of all seeds, performing germination research on plant species from 150 families, 800 genera, and 2500 species over the course of his career. Deno authored 150 papers in chemistry and 20 papers in horticulture, and self-published a number of books that combined his scientific results.

A Chicagoan, Deno had an interest in plants from a young age, but obtained a post-doctoral degree in chemistry as a more lucrative career opportunity. His chemistry professor position at Penn State University resulted in a discovery by his lab on coal refinement for oil refineries that earned him a large amount of wealth from grants. He later reduced his focus on chemistry to pursue his interests in horticulture. Determining the germination requirements for plants had Deno create the "baggie and paper towel" method for mimicking laboratory growth settings and his general low tech methodologies would end up being dubbed "The Deno Method". His approach to seed germination would result in multiple interviews in newspapers and for books, along with seed companies coming to him specifically for specific cultivar research. He went on to publish multiple books covering seed germination theory and he received awards from the North American Rock Garden Society for his work.

== Childhood and education ==
Born in Chicago on February 15, 1921, Deno suffered from asthma as a child and was unable to participate in outdoor sports in school. Instead, he focused on growing plants and became acquainted with daylily hybrid expert David F. Hall who further increased Deno's interest in plant biology. He began giving presentations at garden clubs at 13, but also became interested in the chemistry of fireworks alongside his father.

His teenage years during the Great Depression saw hard times for his family and, since there was little income to be made in the field of horticulture despite his interest in the subject, he chose to study chemistry at the University of Illinois, where he earned a Bachelor of Science degree in 1942. He earned a Master of Science degree in chemistry and a Ph.D. in chemistry from the University of Michigan in 1946 and 1948. During his research for his doctoral degree, he focused on studying the chemistry of explosives in relation to munitions used in World War II. From 1942 to 1946, he studied under Werner Emmanuel Bachmann on the production of the explosive RDX in order to reduce the likelihood of premature detonation during handling for use in torpedoes. After his graduate work, he completed a post-doctoral research degree at Ohio University.

== Career and research ==
=== Chemistry (1950–1980) ===
After graduating, Deno moved to State College, Pennsylvania and became a professor of chemistry at Penn State University in 1950. During his time as a chemist, Deno and his lab students discovered a new technique for the chemical characterization of coal deposits.

Chemists had long been able to distinguish aromatic moieties in coal through dealkylation reactions followed by distillation, but the aliphatic sidechains remained relatively undifferentiated. Deno's lab claimed to demonstrate that a mixture of trifluoroacetic acid and hydrogen peroxide would selectively oxidize the aromatic portions of the coal, leaving functionalized aliphates amenable to characterization. The resulting process would, in principle, reduce the amount necessary to determine if the deposit suited oil refinery customers from 20 tons to less than 1 gram.

Excited by the process, Occidental Petroleum Research Corporation granted Deno funds to investigate the method further, and later Deno would say that "as a chemist he made a considerable impact — and money — with a finding relating to the operation of oil refineries." But Deno quickly changed his research focus to biology, and by 1984 it had become clear that Deno oxidation could not be controlled in the presence of iron pyrite, a common coal impurity.

=== Horticulture (1980–2017) ===
He retired from the position in 1980 to focus on his personal hobby research in horticulture and specifically the chemical processes involved in the seed germination process.. A large amount of his research proved useful for gardeners and those wanting to successfully germinate specific species of plants outside of a lab setting. He found that almost all of the plants he studied used chemicals to determine the timing of germination, which included his studies on the plant hormone gibberellic acid that increases germination rates. He also researched how germination could be manipulated artificially through both physical and chemical means by creating the "baggie and paper towel" method, which uses temperature control and moisture to provoke germination.

His contributions to the North American Rock Garden Society helped promote this method and his technique requiring simple household items for accomplishing germination was referred to as "The Deno Method". This involved replicating the lab setting of blotting paper for sowing seeds and the use of germination chambers by instead using heavy-duty paper towels and plastic sandwich bags to imitate the enclosed chamber environment.

For his other horticultural research, Deno argued that the term "drainage" in regards to watering of plants is fundamentally wrong, as it does not matter the amount of flowing level of water over the roots, but the amount of contained oxygen in them and the capability of the plant at that growth stage to uptake the oxygen into the plant body. He suggested all usage of the term drainage should be replaced with aeration for accuracy.

From his understanding of chemical responses boosting germination, he suggested that the idea of seed dormancy is inaccurate, as there is no form of hibernation going on. The seeds are still active and so he prefers the term "conditioning" in that the seeds are waiting for chemical signals to show that the outside conditions are right so their activity can proceed beyond the seed coat. Deno stressed that sterilized soil had to be used in order to prevent encroachment of pathogenic fungi.

These methodologies developed by Deno were reproduced by gardening photographer Ken Druse for his book Making More Plants: The Science, Art and Joy of Propagation. Seed companies sought his expertise in finding germination techniques for their products; Thompson & Morgan incorporated his methods into their customer directions. He received an Award of Merit in 1978 for his contributions to gardening and a Carleton R. Worth Award in 1990 for his horticultural publications from the North American Rock Garden Society.

=== Books ===
In the early 1980's, Deno decided to write a companion book to horticulturalist and plant taxonomist Bernard Emerson Harkness's Seedlist Handbook, which was a reference book on plant characteristics for seed exchanges between expert growers. Deno's book was to focus on seed germination techniques and the requirements and needs of different species, a topic he felt was lacking from Harkness' and others' works.

The first volume he self-published was titled Seed Germination Theory and Practice and has been referred to by Alpine Gardening as "the bible" of horticulture and a required book for gardeners and those who work with plants. Original physical copies were sold by Deno for $20 through the mail and he estimated that over 40,000 copies were bought in total. The second edition of the book was published in 1993 and listed germination rules for over 2,500 individual species of plants. These covered 605 different genera of plants. The first supplement to the book was published in 1996 and added 1,080 further species. A final volume of his research that was to be titled "Seed Storage Theory and Practice" was never written. In total, his book and supplements covered germination research on plant species from 150 families, 800 genera, and 2500 species. Copies of Deno's works are hosted in the United States National Agricultural Library archive.

== Personal life ==
Deno had three children with his wife Ginny before her death after 52 years of marriage. He met his second wife Janet at a ballroom dancing event. They married in 1997 and remained together until his death on September 22, 2017.

He was a lifetime member of the North American Rock Garden Society, the Alpine Garden Society, and the Scottish Rock Garden Club.

== Bibliography ==
- Seed Germination Theory and Practice (1991), Second Edition (1993)
- First supplement: Seed Germination Theory and Practice (1996)
- Second supplement: Seed Germination Theory and Practice (1998)
