= Bountiful, Utah =

City in Utah, United States

- City
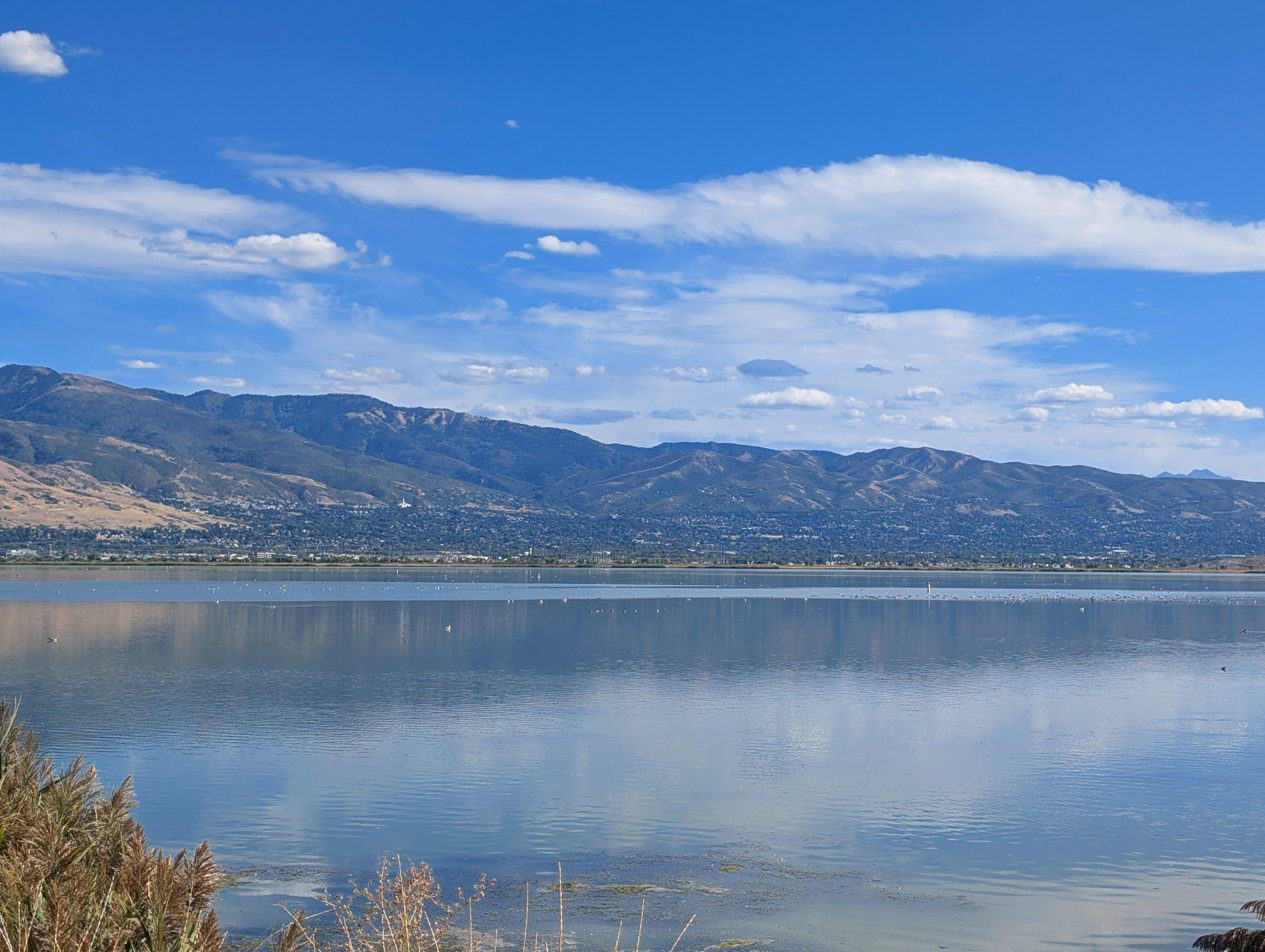
- Bountiful, Utah as viewed from Farmington Bay
- Interactive map of Bountiful, Utah
- Location within Utah Location within the United States
- Coordinates: 40°52′20″N 111°52′18″W
- Country: United States
- State: Utah
- County: Davis
- Settled: September 27, 1847
- Incorporated: 1892
- Founder: Perrigrine Sessions
- Named for: Bountiful (Book of Mormon)

Area
  - Total: 13.22 sq mi (34.23 km^{2})
  - Land: 13.19 sq mi (34.17 km^{2})
  - Water: 0.023 sq mi (0.06 km^{2})
- Elevation: 4,771 ft (1,454 m)

Population (2020)
  - Total: 45,762
  - Density: 3,469/sq mi (1,339/km^{2})
- Time zone: UTC−7 (MST)
  - Summer (DST): UTC−6 (MDT)
- ZIP code: 84010, 84011
- Area codes: 385, 801
- FIPS code: 49-07690
- GNIS feature ID: 2409885
- Website: bountifulutah.gov

Bountiful is a city in Davis County, Utah. As of the 2020 census, the city population was 45,762, an eight percent increase over the 2010 figure of 42,552. The city grew rapidly during the suburb growth of the late 1940s, 1950s, and 1960s and was Davis County's largest city until 1985, when it was surpassed by Layton. Bountiful is Utah's 18th-largest city.

Although a part of the Ogden–Clearfield metropolitan area, it serves as a bedroom community to Salt Lake City and the surrounding area. However, due to the very narrow entrance into Salt Lake County, roads between the counties often reach near-gridlock traffic during rush hour. The FrontRunner commuter rail has been running since April 2008, and the Legacy Parkway was opened on September 13, 2008. These were built to help alleviate the traffic load on Interstate 15 through the Bountiful area.

== History ==
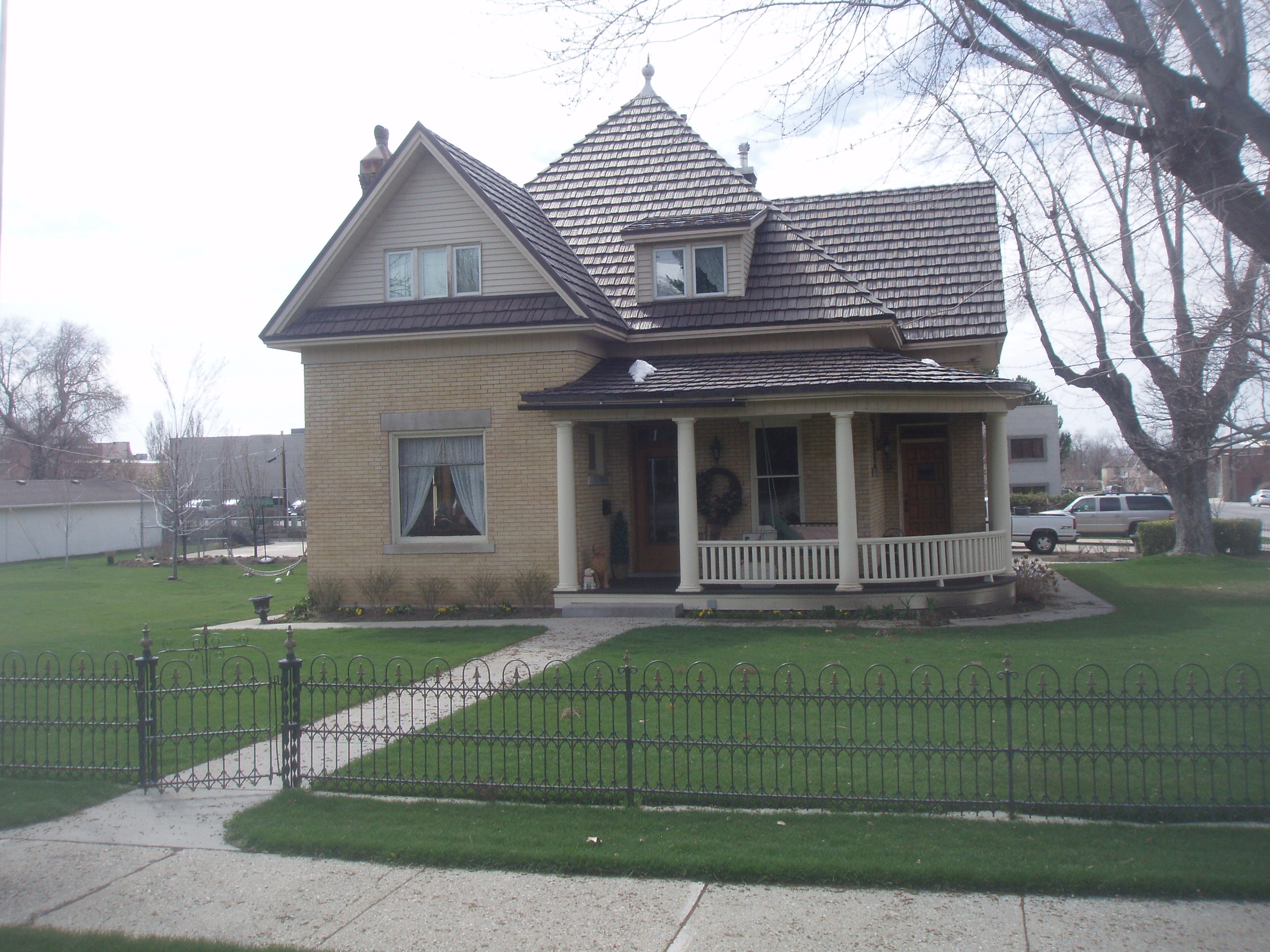
A home in Bountiful's Historic District

Bountiful was settled on September 27, 1847, by Perrigrine Sessions and his family. It was Utah's second settlement after Salt Lake City. It was known as Sessions Settlement and North Canyon Ward before being named Bountiful in 1855. This city was so named both because of the city's reputation as a great place for gardening and because "Bountiful" is the name of a city in the Book of Mormon (Alma 52:9). Most of the settlers, and also many of the present inhabitants, are members of the Church of Jesus Christ of Latter-day Saints (LDS). The city also shares 14 other religious institutions, including a Catholic school and church, Saint Olaf School, established in 1959. The Bountiful Utah Temple was dedicated in 1995 by the LDS Church. A tabernacle of The Church of Jesus Christ of Latter-day Saints is also located in Bountiful.

The city was incorporated in 1892 with Joseph L Holbrook as mayor.

In 1907 electric lights came to Bountiful through the efforts of its citizens.

Serial killer Ted Bundy snatched victim Debra Kent from Viewmont High School in Bountiful on November 8, 1974.

The city celebrates its history at the annual Handcart Days celebration every July in conjunction with the U.S. State of Utah's official holiday, Pioneer Day. Handcart Days is a volunteer-driven event. People from Six cities in the south of Davis County, Utah come together to commemorate the first group of Mormon Pioneers’ entry into the Salt Lake Valley on July 24, 1847. The festivities include a parade, fireworks, games, entertainment, an art exhibit, and food.

== Geography ==
According to the United States Census Bureau, the city has a total area of 13.5 square miles (34.9 km^{2}), all land.

The original portion of the city and downtown is located at the base of the Wasatch Range, which rises high to the east, overlooking the city. Most of the residential neighborhoods climb high up the slopes of the mountain. To the west lies a flatland that extends to the Great Salt Lake and the mudflats and marshes that border it. Areas of Bountiful include Val Verda in the southern part of the city.

The cities surrounding Bountiful include: North Salt Lake to the south, Woods Cross and West Bountiful to the west, and Centerville to the north. Most land to the east of Bountiful is U.S. Forest Service property.

=== Climate ===
Under the Köppen climate classification system, Bountiful's climate can be described as dry or arid.

Climate data for Bountiful–Val Verda, Utah
| Month | Jan | Feb | Mar | Apr | May | Jun | Jul | Aug | Sep | Oct | Nov | Dec | Year |
|---|---|---|---|---|---|---|---|---|---|---|---|---|---|
| Record high °F (°C) | 59 (15) | 65 (18) | 76 (24) | 87 (31) | 97 (36) | 100 (38) | 104 (40) | 101 (38) | 95 (35) | 88 (31) | 76 (24) | 68 (20) | 104 (40) |
| Mean daily maximum °F (°C) | 37.1 (2.8) | 41.9 (5.5) | 52.1 (11.2) | 60.0 (15.6) | 69.8 (21.0) | 80.2 (26.8) | 89.8 (32.1) | 88.1 (31.2) | 77.2 (25.1) | 63.8 (17.7) | 48.8 (9.3) | 38.4 (3.6) | 62.3 (16.8) |
| Daily mean °F (°C) | 29.6 (−1.3) | 33.4 (0.8) | 42.3 (5.7) | 49.1 (9.5) | 58.5 (14.7) | 68.0 (20.0) | 76.7 (24.8) | 74.7 (23.7) | 64.4 (18.0) | 52.2 (11.2) | 39.7 (4.3) | 30.8 (−0.7) | 51.6 (10.9) |
| Mean daily minimum °F (°C) | 22.1 (−5.5) | 24.8 (−4.0) | 32.4 (0.2) | 38.3 (3.5) | 47.3 (8.5) | 55.8 (13.2) | 63.6 (17.6) | 61.4 (16.3) | 51.5 (10.8) | 40.7 (4.8) | 30.5 (−0.8) | 23.1 (−4.9) | 41.0 (5.0) |
| Record low °F (°C) | −3 (−19) | −5 (−21) | 7 (−14) | 22 (−6) | 29 (−2) | 33 (1) | 47 (8) | 46 (8) | 30 (−1) | 19 (−7) | 5 (−15) | −9 (−23) | −9 (−23) |
| Average precipitation inches (mm) | 1.79 (45) | 1.93 (49) | 2.50 (64) | 2.96 (75) | 2.79 (71) | 1.37 (35) | 0.93 (24) | 0.90 (23) | 1.66 (42) | 2.30 (58) | 2.13 (54) | 2.10 (53) | 23.36 (593) |
| Average snowfall inches (cm) | 12.1 (31) | 12.9 (33) | 8.4 (21) | 4.2 (11) | 0.2 (0.51) | 0 (0) | 0 (0) | 0 (0) | 0 (0) | 0.9 (2.3) | 6.7 (17) | 13.3 (34) | 58.7 (149) |
Source: NOAA Regional Climate Centers (normals 1980–2010, records 1912–2014)

== Demographics ==
Historical population
| Census | Pop. | Note | %± |
|---|---|---|---|
| 1860 | 868 | | — |
| 1870 | 1,517 | | 74.8% |
| 1880 | 1,676 | | 10.5% |
| 1890 | 2,438 | | 45.5% |
| 1900 | 1,442 | | −40.9% |
| 1910 | 1,677 | | 16.3% |
| 1920 | 2,003 | | 19.4% |
| 1930 | 2,571 | | 28.4% |
| 1940 | 3,357 | | 30.6% |
| 1950 | 6,004 | | 78.9% |
| 1960 | 17,039 | | 183.8% |
| 1970 | 27,751 | | 62.9% |
| 1980 | 32,877 | | 18.5% |
| 1990 | 36,659 | | 11.5% |
| 2000 | 41,301 | | 12.7% |
| 2010 | 42,552 | | 3.0% |
| 2020 | 45,762 | | 7.5% |
U.S. Decennial Census

The most common ancestries in Bountiful were English (35.1%), German (10.5%), Irish (6.7%), Danish (6.6%), and Scottish (5.0%).

89.6% of residents speak only English at home, while 5.2% speak Spanish, 2.9% speak other Indo-European languages, and 1.9% speak Asian and Pacific Islander languages (e.g., Tagalog).

=== 2020 census ===
As of the 2020 census, Bountiful had a population of 45,762. The median age was 35.1 years. 27.9% of residents were under the age of 18, and 16.5% of residents were 65 years of age or older. For every 100 females there were 97.7 males, and for every 100 females age 18 and over there were 94.0 males age 18 and over.

99.0% of residents lived in urban areas, while 1.0% lived in rural areas.

Bountiful had 15,427 households, of which 36.5% had children under age 18. Of all households, 61.5% were married-couple households, 13.1% were households with a male householder and no spouse or partner present, and 21.9% were households with a female householder and no spouse or partner present. About 21.0% of all households were made up of individuals and 10.5% had someone living alone who was 65 years of age or older.

There were 15,945 housing units, of which 3.2% were vacant. The homeowner vacancy rate was 0.6% and the rental vacancy rate was 4.8%.

Racial composition as of the 2020 census
| Race | Number | Percent |
|---|---|---|
| White | 39,557 | 86.4% |
| Black or African American | 361 | 0.8% |
| American Indian and Alaska Native | 229 | 0.5% |
| Asian | 728 | 1.6% |
| Native Hawaiian and Other Pacific Islander | 563 | 1.2% |
| Some other race | 1,264 | 2.8% |
| Two or more races | 3,060 | 6.7% |
| Hispanic or Latino (of any race) | 3,475 | 7.6% |

== Medical facilities ==
Lakeview Hospital is a hospital located in Bountiful.

Envision Imaging is a diagnostic imaging center located in Bountiful.

== Public schools ==
Elementary schools

- Adelaide Elementary School
- Boulton Elementary School
- Bountiful Elementary School
- Holbrook Elementary School
- Meadowbrook Elementary School
- Muir Elementary School
- Oak Hills Elementary School
- Tolman Elementary School
- Valley View Elementary School

Junior high schools

- Bountiful Junior High School
- Millcreek Junior High School
- Mueller Park Junior High School
- South Davis Junior High School

High schools

- Bountiful High School
- Viewmont High School

== Sights of interest ==
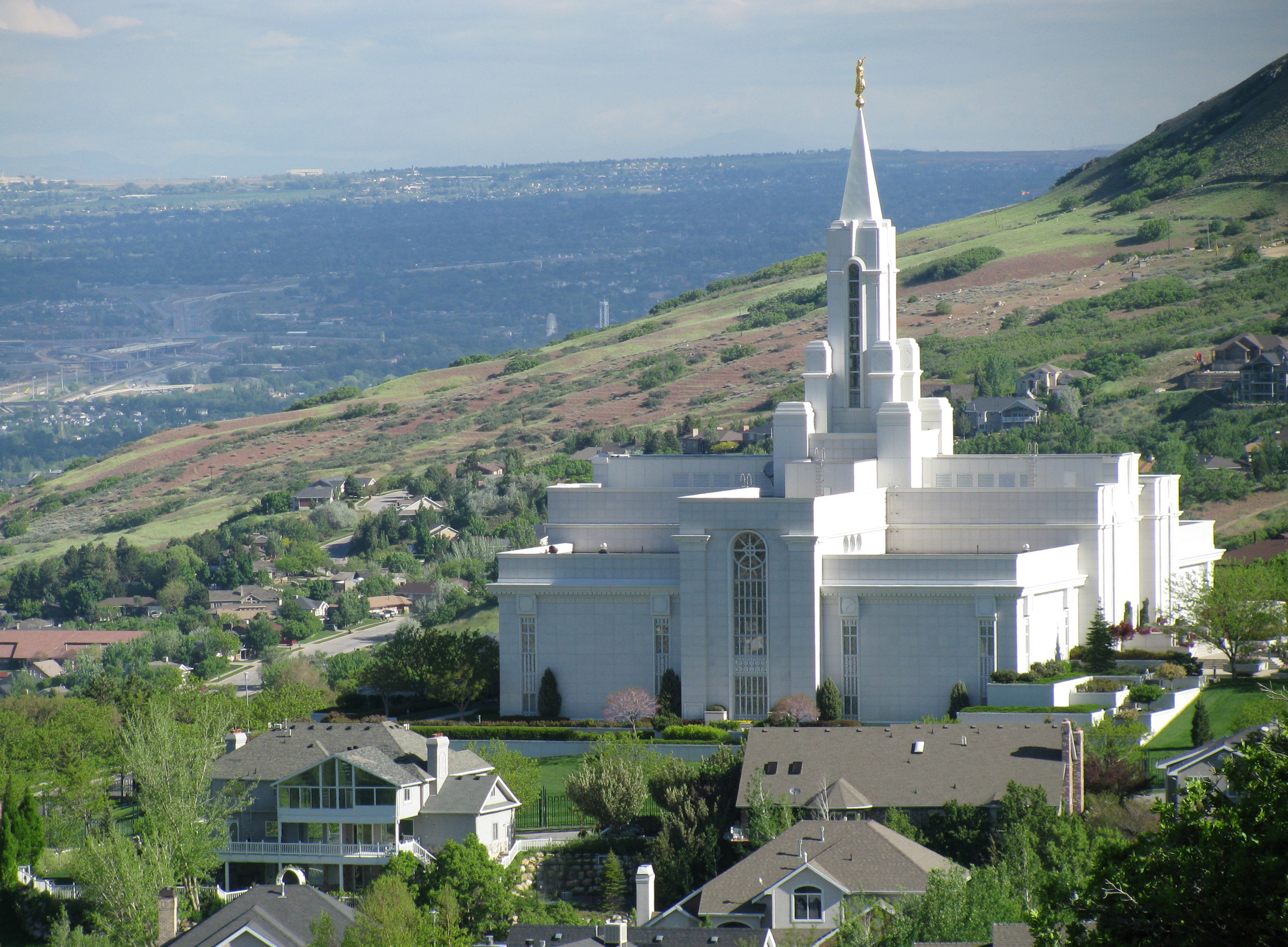
The Bountiful Utah Temple of the Church of Jesus Christ of Latter-day Saints

- Bountiful Utah Temple of the Church of Jesus Christ of Latter-day Saints, dedicated 1995

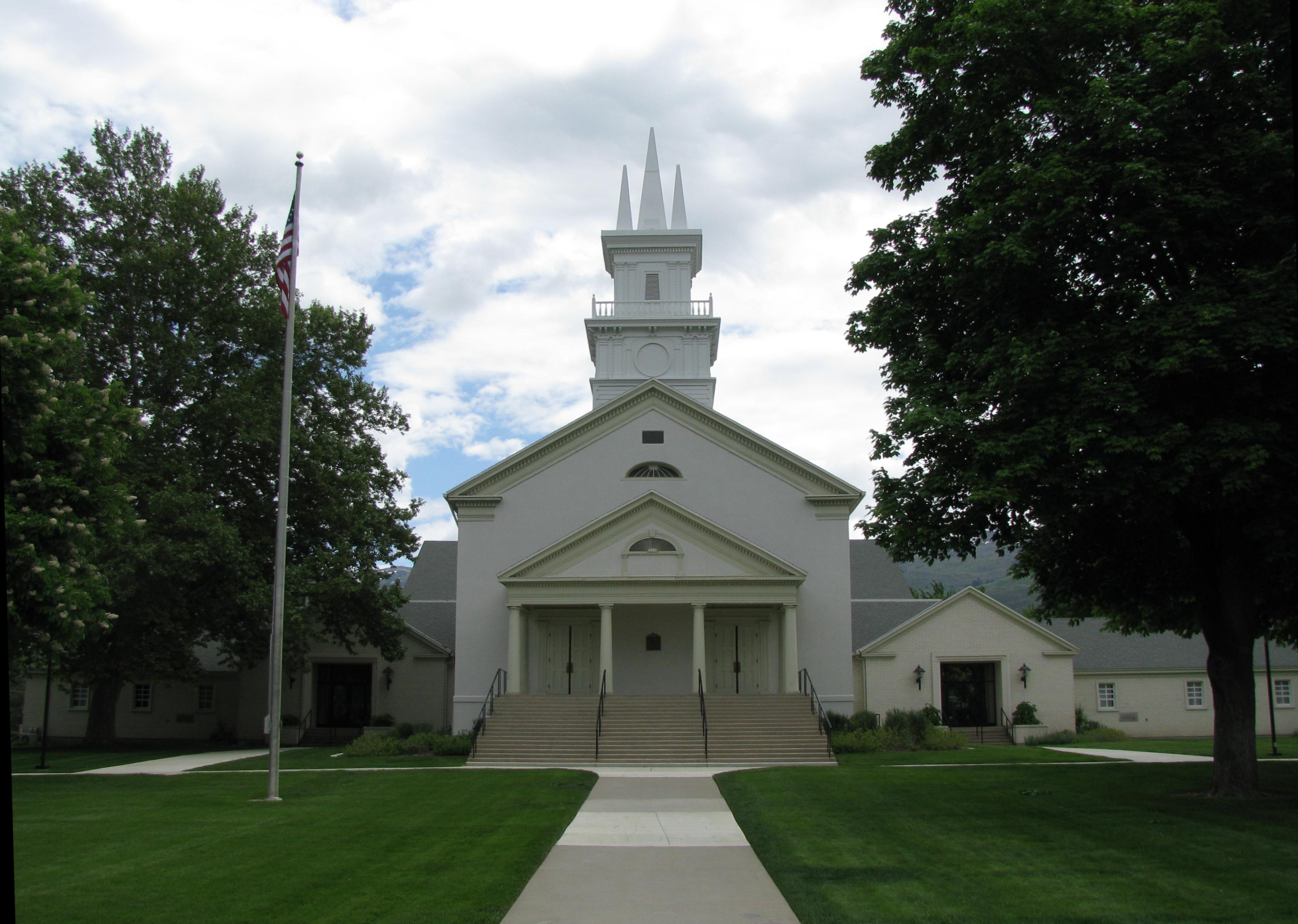
The Bountiful Utah Tabernacle of The Church of Jesus Christ of Latter-day Saints

- Bountiful Utah Tabernacle of The Church of Jesus Christ of Latter-day Saints, erected 1862

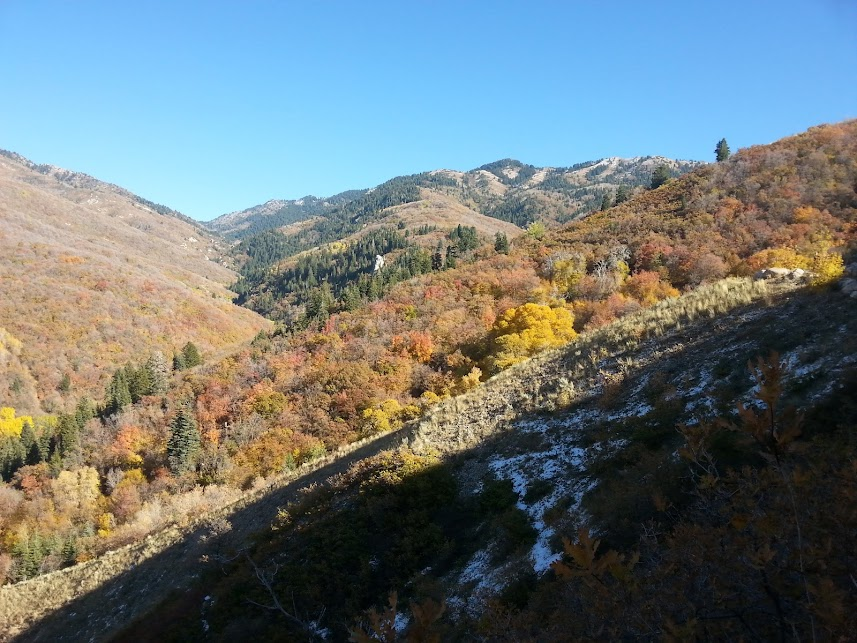
Mueller Park Canyon in Bountiful, Utah

- Mueller Park Trail in Mueller Park Canyon, a popular hiking trail in the area.

== Notable people ==
- Kim Burningham, educator, politician
- Kyle Capener, reality TV personality, contestant on Big Brother Season 24
- Bryan H. Carroll, director, producer, screenwriter and editor
- Holly Cook, 1990 World Figure Skating Championships ladies' bronze medalist
- Tyrell Crosby, NFL player, University of Oregon football player
- Keene Curtis, stage, film and television actor
- Kent Derricott, TV personality in Japan
- Henry B. Eyring, Second Counselor in the First Presidency of the Church of Jesus Christ of Latter-day Saints
- Jake Gibb, professional beach volleyball player and US Olympian
- Parker Jacobs, actor, artist and performer
- Chris Jones, software developer and star of the Tex Murphy PC series
- G.E. Lemmon, cattleman
- Sam Merrill, NBA player, Utah State University basketball player
- James Morrison, actor
- Pete Oswald, illustrator
- George Ouzounian a.k.a. Maddox, writer
- Ivy Baker Priest, United States Treasurer under President Eisenhower; mother of actress Pat Priest
- Pat Priest, actress (The Munsters); resident until her junior year of high school
- Cal Rampton, former Governor of Utah
- Patrick Rooney, businessperson
- Jon Schmidt, new age pianist and composer, member of The Piano Guys
- Norman D. Shumway, former United States congressman
- Millicent Simmonds, deaf actress best known for her role in the film A Quiet Place
- Raymond Ward, Utah State House Representative

== See also ==
- List of cities and towns in Utah
- Headgate Studios
- Skypark Airport
- State Route 68 (Utah)
- West Bountiful, Utah
- Centerville, Utah
