= Lemon (surname) =

People surnamed Lemon:

- Alec Lemon (born 1991), American football player
- Alex Lemon (born 1978), American poet and memoirist
- Alton Lemon (1928–2013), American social worker and civil rights activist
- Arthur Lemon (1905–1982), Wales international rugby player
- Arthur Henry Lemon (1864–1933), British colonial administrator
- Ben Lemon (born 1955), American actor
- Bob Lemon (1920–2000), American Major League Baseball pitcher
- Brian Lemon (1937–2014), British jazz pianist and arranger
- Sir Charles Lemon (1784–1868), 2nd Baronet, British Member of Parliament
- Chet Lemon (1955–2025), American Major League Baseball Player
- Cleo Lemon (born 1979), NFL free agent quarterback
- Cliff Lemon (1901–1955), American football player
- Dave Lemon (born 1969), British rower
- Don Lemon (born 1966), American television journalist
- Dot Lemon (1907–1986), American aviator
- Sir Ernest Lemon (1884–1954), English railway engineer
- Gary Lemon (born 1961), American tennis player
- Genevieve Lemon (born 1959), Australian actress and singer
- George William Lemon (1726–1797), English etymologist
- James Lemon (1903–1977), co-owner of the Washington Senators
- Jim Lemon (1928–2006), American Major League Baseball player
- John Lemon (1754–1814), British Member of Parliament, brother of Sir William Lemon
- John Lemon (prospector), 19th-century prospector in Alaska
- Jonathan Lemon (born 1965), British-American cartoonist and former musician
- Keith Lemon, a character played by comedian Leigh Francis
- Ken Lemon (born 1939), New Zealand country musician
- Kim Lemon, American TV journalist
- Laura Lemon (1866–1924), Canadian composer
- Leslie R. Lemon (1948–2020), American meteorologist
- Liz Lemon, character on the situation comedy 30 Rock
- Makai Lemon (born 2004), American football player
- Margaret Lemon (c. 1614–c. 1643), English artist's model
- Margaretta Lemon (1860–1953), known as "Etta", ornithologist and founder member of RSPB
- Mark Lemon (1809–1870), editor of the British weekly Punch
- Mark Lemon (speedway rider) (born 1973), Australian speedway rider
- Meadowlark Lemon (1932–2015), American basketball player and actor
- Merce Lemon, American indie rock musician
- Orie Lemon (born 1987), American football player
- Paul Lemon (born 1966), English footballer
- Percy Lemon (1898–1932), British polar explorer
- Peter C. Lemon (born 1950), American Medal of Honor recipient
- Ralph Lemon (born 1952), American choreographer and visual artist
- Roger Lemon (born 1946), British neurophysiologist
- Shawn Lemon (born 1988), American football player
- Theo Lemon (born 1957), American football coach and former player
- Tracy Lemon (1970–2012), New Zealand rugby union player
- Walt Lemon Jr. (born 1992), American basketball player in the Israel Basketball Premier League
- Wayne Lemon, American playwright and screenwriter
- Sir William Lemon (1748–1824), 1st Baronet Lemon of Carclew, British Member of Parliament
- William Lemon III (born 1978), American make-up artist, musician and fashion designer

== See also ==
- Lemons (surname)
- Lemon (disambiguation)
- Lemmon (disambiguation)
