= Oranges and Lemons (disambiguation) =

"Oranges and Lemons" is a nursery rhyme.

Oranges and Lemons may also refer to:

- Oranges & Lemons (band), a Japanese pop band
- Oranges & Lemons (album), an album by XTC
- Oranges and Lemons (film), a 1923 film starring Stan Laurel
- Oranges and Lemons (1991 film), a 1991 British television film by Kay Adshead in the anthology series ScreenPlay
- "Oranges and Lemons", an episode of Teletubbies

== See also ==
- Orange and Lemons, a Filipino rock band
- Lemon (disambiguation)
- Orange (disambiguation)
