= Lemon (novella) =

South Korean novella by Kwon Yeo-sun

First edition

Lemon (Korean: 레몬) is 2019 a South Korean novella by Kwon Yeo-sun.

== Development ==
In 2016 Kwon published a short story called "You Do Not Know." She later expanded it and published it as Lemon, which was published in its home country in 2019. Changbi Publishers is the South Korean publisher.

It was published in English in 2021, with Janet Hong being the translator.

== Content ==
It has eight sections, with perspective being switched between characters, with different characters having different viewpoints of the same events. Publishers Weekly stated that each section reads like a short story.

=== Plot ===
The plot concerns a murder in 2002, during the summer, of 18-year old Kim Hae-on, a student in high school whose body is found in Seoul. Publishers Weekly states that Hae-on is "preternaturally beautiful but strange". The case gains the name "The High School Beauty Murder". Police interview Han Manu and Shin Jeongjun, the former someone who works to deliver goods and the latter affluent, but cannot prove either had killed the victim. The public loses interest in the case after an initial media storm.

An interrogation makes up a large portion of chapter 1.

The perspective switches between Kim Da-on, the younger sister of the victim; Sanghui, who attended school with Hae-on; and Yun Taerim, another classmate. Da-on, about 15 years old, had assisted Hae-on when she was alive.

Arianna Rebolini of Vulture stated that the plot primarily focuses more on "the motivations of those consuming the" narrative of the murder rather than the perpetrator and the victim.

Oyinkan Braithwite of The New York Times wrote that the characters "exist more as vehicles through which the story is told than as flesh-and-blood individuals."

==== Characters ====
- Kim Dae-on focuses on the case for a long period of time. Within the novel she is described as "short and dumpy". She is the narrator of the majority of the work. In portions of the work she undergoes counseling and has dialogs with the counselors. Da-on had felt inferior to her sister, and after her sister's death, in order to gain a more similar appearance, she undergoes sessions of plastic surgery.
- Taerim starts a relationship with and marries Shin Jeongjun.
- Sanghui pheripherally knew Hae-on. Rebolini states that Sanghui has the closest "objective reporting" and "acts as a stand-in for the rapt audience."

== Reception ==
Braithwite described Lemon as "a bright, intense, refreshing story."

Publishers Weekly gave the novella a positive review, stating that it "hits and sticks".
