= Robert Stell Lemmon =

American writer and naturalist

Robert Stell Lemmon (born 26 June 1885 in Englewood, New Jersey; died 3 March 1964 in Wilton, Connecticut), often Robert S. Lemmon in publications, was an American writer and naturalist. He wrote and lectured on domestic dogs, gardening, wildlife, wild flowers and trees. Most of his writing was non-fiction, but in 1923 he also wrote an adventure short-story called The Bamboo Trap, about an American entomologist caught in a cave in the Ecuadorian jungle.

== Career ==
Lemmon was the son of William and Caroline Lemmon, née McCulloh. After finishing the Englewood School for Boys he studied at Yale University, where he earned a Bachelor of Arts degree in 1909. He then worked for the American Trading Company. In 1911, he accompanied a zoological expedition of the Academy of Natural Sciences of Philadelphia to Ecuador. Upon his return, he became co-editor of the Travel Magazine. From 1915 to 1918 he was editor and from 1918 to 1937 managing editor of the magazine House & Garden. In 1920, he married Florence G. Edwards in New York City. A daughter resulted from this marriage. During the 1930s he was treasurer of the North American Rock Garden Society (NARGS) and in 1938, he founded the horticultural magazine Real Gardening. From 1943 to 1951 he was editor-in-chief of the magazine The Home Garden.

Lemmon travelled extensively throughout the United States and South America, where he studied the fauna and flora. He wrote over 300 articles for various magazines and several natural history books, including some for children. Initially, Lemmon's books dealt with domestic dogs, including his first work, Training the Dog, published in 1914, and The Puppy Book (1924) about puppies and About your Dog (1928). Lemmon was a member of the National Audubon Society, where he wrote several books for their Nature Program book series, the American Ornithologists' Union and the Yale Club of New York City.

== Works ==
- Training the Dog, McBride, Nast & Company, New York, 1914
- The Bamboo Trap, Doubdleday, Page & Company, 1923
- The Puppy Book, Doubleday, 1924
- with Richardson L. Wright: House & Garden′s Second Book of Gardens, Conde Nast, 1927
- About your Dog, Frederick A. Stokes Company, 1928
- Old Doc Lemmon, The Midland Company, 1930
- How to attract the birds: Planting, feeding, housing, American Garden Guild, 1947
- The Birds are yours, Macmillan, 1951 (illustrations by Don Richard Eckelberry)
- Our Amazing Birds: The little-known facts about their private lives, American Garden Guild and Doubleday, 1952 (illustrations by Don Richard Eckelberry)
- The best loved Trees of America: Intimate Close-ups of their Year-round Traits, American Garden Guild and Doubleday, 1952
- National Audubon Society Nature Program: Favorite Wildflowers, Nelson Doubleday, 1954
- National Audubon Society Nature Program: Best Loved Song Birds, Nelson Doubleday, 1954
- National Audubon Society Nature Program: Flowering Trees and Shrubs, Nelson Doubleday, 1955
- National Audubon Society Nature Program: Seeds and Seed Pods, Nelson Doubleday, 1955
- National Audubon Society Nature Program: Dogs, Nelson Doubleday, 1955
- All about Birds, Random House, 1955
- National Audubon Society Nature Program: Burst of Spring, Nelson Doubleday, 1956
- National Audubon Society Nature Program: House Plants, Nelson Doubleday, 1956
- National Audubon Society Nature Program: Life on a Farm, Nelson Doubleday, 1956
- City Parks and Home Gardens, vol. 3 of the series The Community of Living Things (in collaboration with the National Audubon Society), Creative Educational Society, 1956
- All about Moths and Butterflies, Random House, 1956
- All about strange Beasts of the Present, Random House, 1957
- with Jean Zallinger: All about Monkeys, Random House, 1958
- with Charles L. Sherman: Flowers of the World in Full Color, Hannover House, 1958 (2nd edit. as Flowers of the World, 1964)
- National Audubon Society Nature Program: Favorite Song Birds, Nelson Doubleday, 1959
- Junior Science Book of Trees, Garrand Press, 1960
- National Audubon Society Nature Program: Wildflowers of the Mountains, Nelson Doubleday, 1960
- Wildflowers of North America in Full Color, Hannover House, 1961
- Junior Science Book of Big Cats, Garrand Press, 1962
- National Audubon Society Nature Program: Wild flowers of the meadows, Nelson Doubleday, 1967 (posthumous)
