= Kwon Yeo-sun =

South Korean writer (born 1965)

- Born: 1965 (age 60–61)
- Writing career
- Language: Korean

Korean name
- Hangul: 권여선
- RR: Gwon Yeoseon
- MR: Kwŏn Yŏsŏn

Kwon Yeo-sun (born 1965) is a South Korean writer.

== Life ==
Kwon Yeo-sun was born in Andong, North Gyeongsang Province of South Korea in 1965. Kwon enjoyed a brilliant literary debut in 1996 when her novel Niche of Green was awarded the Sangsang Literary Award. At the time, novels that reflected on the period of the democratization movement in South Korea, were prevalent.

== Work ==
Kwon's work is often unconventional in form and topic and for that reason she sometimes has a reputation for being difficult to read

Kwon's first work Niche of Green was one of the most outstanding coming-of-age novels to emerge from the South Korean publishing world of the 1990s. Eight years after the publication of Niche of Green, Kwon published a short story collection called Maiden’s Skirt. This collection, a book that Kwon professes felt like publishing a love letter to herself, is about defeated individuals who, though troubled by their tragic fates, come to a place of resigned acceptance. The characters in this collection generally consist of people who are handicapped by relationships that society does not accept, such as extramarital affairs and gay relationships. Unable to overcome this sense of handicap, the characters witness their love collapse. In Kwon's second short story collection The Days of Pink Ribbon, the characters are often people who have failed rather than succeeded. They are generally people with defects in their character or physique. In Kwon's work, characters do not fail because of exterior causes but because of their own shortcomings or due to bad fate.

Her novel, told through interconnected short stories, Lemon, was expanded from her 2016 short story "You Do Not Know". It was her first work translated into English, with Janet Hong as the translator and the translation released in 2021.

== Works in Korean (Partial) ==
Novels

- Niche of Green

Short Story Collections

- Maiden’s Skirt and The Days of Pink Ribbon

== Works in English ==
- Kwon, Yeo-Sun (2021), Lemon, New York, New York: Other Press, ISBN 9781635420883

== Awards ==
- Imaginative Literature Award (1996)
- Oh Yŏng Su Literary Award (2007)
- Yi Sang Literary Award (2008)
- Hankook Ilbo Literary Award (2012)
- EBS Radio Literature Award of Excellence (2013)
