= Mueller Park canyon =

Coordinates: 40.8625°N 111.8323°W

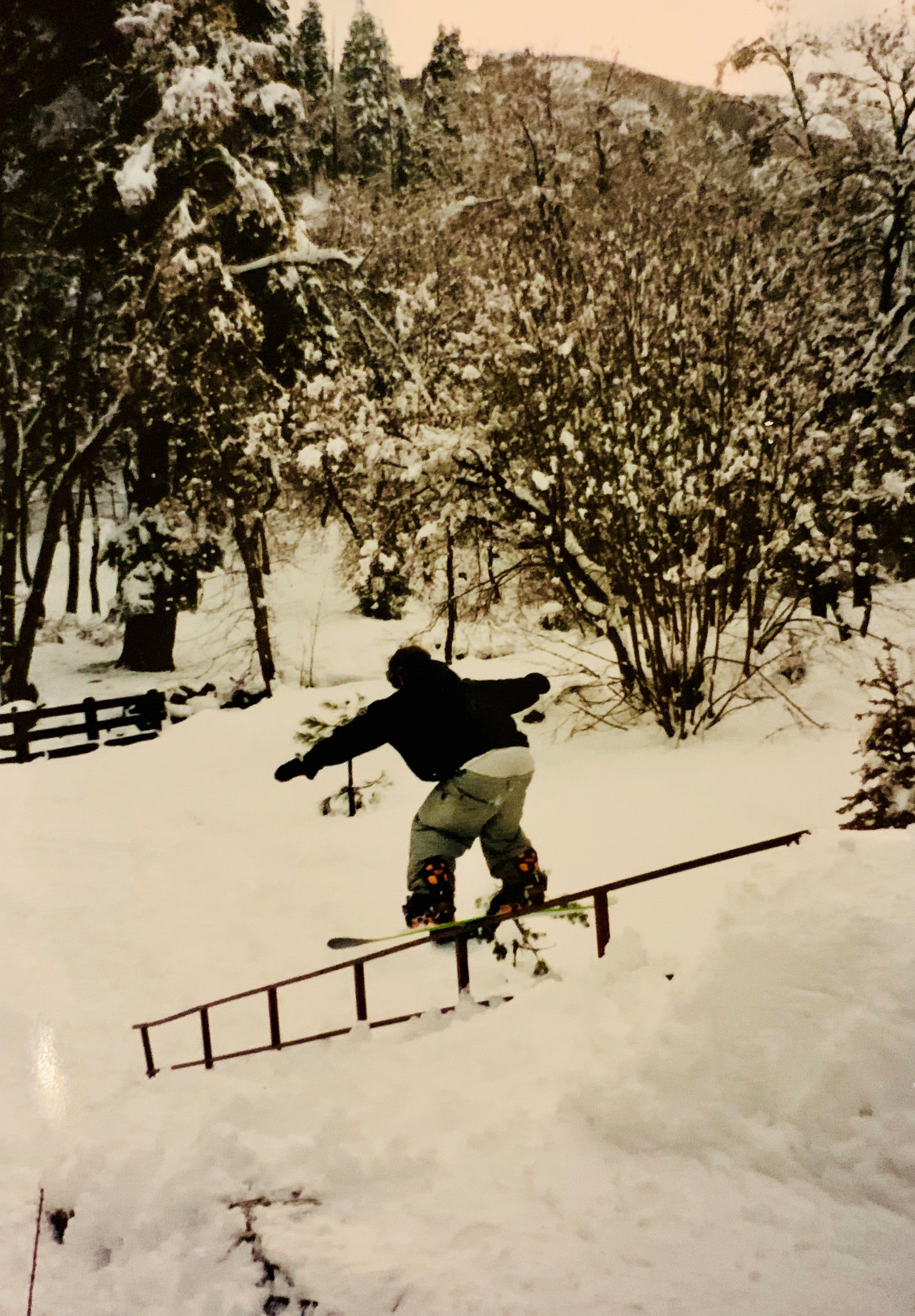
Professional snowboarder Matty Shaffer filming on Mueller Park canyon rail in Bountiful, Utah in 2002.

Mueller Park canyon is located in Bountiful, Utah, at an elevation of 5,400 ft (1,600 m). It is 5 mi (8.0 km) from downtown in the Wasatch Front mountains. It's home to Mill Creek and many hiking and biking trails. It is best known for Elephant Rock where people will either hike or bike to and watch the sunset over the Great Salt Lake. There are more than 10,000 people who visit the Mueller Park trails weekly.

== Activities ==
The canyon allows people to group picnic and camp. Years ago snowboarders would use a stairs railing to perform tricks. The railing was located next to the picnic grounds. Many different professional snowboarders were featured in snowboarding magazines and videos.

People also are allowed to bike and hike many of the trails located in the canyon. A popular 7 mi (11 km) round trip hike is to Big Rock, which locals call Elephant Rock because it looks similar to the head of an elephant when the sun sets. There is also a longer 13 mi (21 km) loop to Rudy's Flat that mountain bikers use as a descent or climb depending on the direction from North Canyon.
