= Kent Derricott =

- Born: March 3, 1955 (age 71); Lethbridge, Alberta, Canada
- Occupation: Actor

Kent Derricott (ケント・デリカット, Kento Derikatto; born March 3, 1955 in Lethbridge, Alberta, Canada) is an actor and celebrity television personality or gaijin tarento, in Japan. He first learned Japanese while serving as a Missionary for the Church of Jesus Christ of Latter-day Saints in Japan when he was 19 years old. He is known as one of "the two Kents" (along with Kent Gilbert). Derricott was the first thing to come to the mind of Japanese when asked about Utah for a 2002 study for the 2002 Winter Olympics in Salt Lake City, Utah.

While he has been offered celebrity jobs in the United States (such as the opportunity to be the replacement for Richard Dawson on Family Feud), he is not interested in becoming a celebrity outside Japan. After returning from Japan in the 1990s, Derricott started his own television production company. Derricott is a consultant for businesses working in or expanding to Japan and he now lives in Bountiful, Utah. He still makes occasional appearances on Japanese television.

== Books ==
Derricott has written several books published in Japan, including:

- Kent Derricott's OK! English Conversation (ケント・デリカットのだいじょうぶ!英会話, Kento Derikatto no Daijōbu! Eikaiwa) (Zenkoku Asahi Hōsō, November 1988, ISBN 4-88131-119-0)
- Becoming a Papa! (パパになる!, Papa ni Naru!) (KTC Chūō Shuppan, July 1999, ISBN 4-87758-148-0)
- Gum Trouble (ガムふんじゃった, Gamu Funjatta) (Hakusensha, October 2005, ISBN 4-592-76109-X)
- Kent Derricott's Icebreaker (ケント・デリカットのアイスブレーカー, Kento Derikatto no Aisuburēkā) (Takeshobo, June 1991, ISBN 4-88475-083-7)
