= G. E. Lemmon =

American cattleman

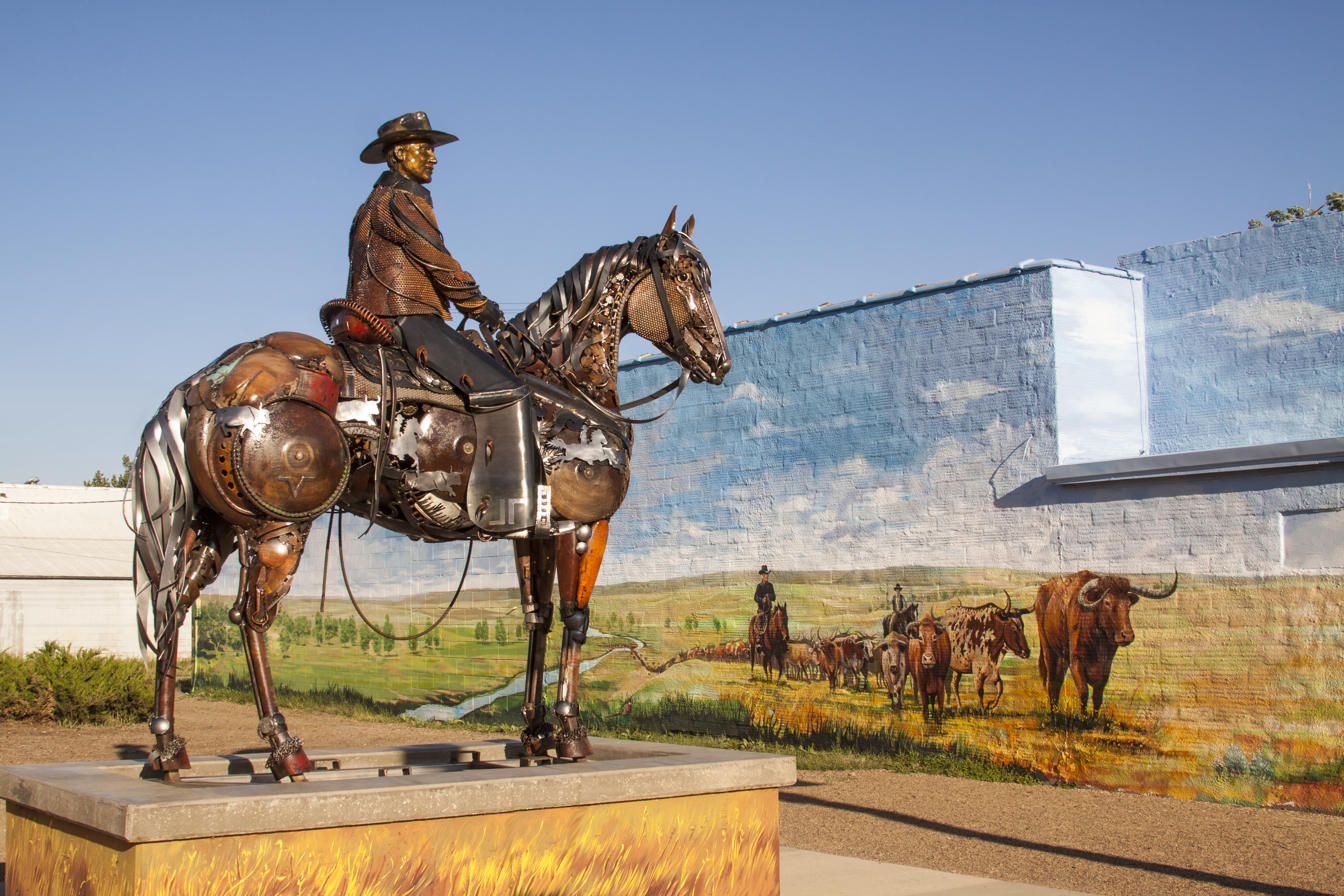
A statue of Ed Lemmon in Boss Cowman Square

George Edward "Dad" or "Ed" Lemmon (1857–1945) was among the elite cattlemen at the turn of the 20th century. Lemmon is credited with starting the Western South Dakota Stockgrowers Association, helping the Chicago Milwaukee & St. Paul Railroad – a predecessor of Chicago, Milwaukee, St. Paul and Pacific Railroad – through South Dakota, and founding a town along that railroad named Lemmon, South Dakota. He was also a prolific writer who preserved a firsthand account of the history of the western United States.

== Early years ==
Lemmon was born at Bountiful, Utah. He began his days of working as a cowhand when he was twelve or thirteen years old. He worked as a cowhand and foreman for many different ranches in the Great Plains region.

Lemmon began managing the Sheidley Cattle Company in 1891, and in 1893 sold his shares of the company and went into business with Richard Lake and Thomas Tomb.

== Later years ==
While selling cattle in Chicago every year, Lemmon got to know many important members of the city, including the director of CM&SP Railroad, R. M. Calkins. Calkins then asked Lemmon to help with a route for the railroad coming through South Dakota. Lemmon then picked a route from Mobridge, South Dakota through the Standing Rock Indian Reservation. He founded a town on the west side of the reservation. In honor of Lemmon, Calkins named the railroad town "Lemmon". The original site that Lemmon chose for the town was four miles east of its present location and into North Dakota. North Dakota having prohibition laws against saloons, Lemmon chose to locate the town just on the South Dakota-North Dakota border, thinking that this would help it in becoming a boom town. Also being on the border, Lemmon hoped to hold a dual county seat in Perkins County, South Dakota and Adams County, North Dakota. This never came about, but Lemmon is the largest city in present-day Perkins County.

In his later years, Lemmon spent much of his time recording his life’s tales by publishing story articles in the Belle Fourche Bee, in Belle Fourche, South Dakota, every week. He started writing the stories in 1932 and kept writing until the 1940s. These weekly stories were compiled into a book by Phyllis Schmidt, titled The West As I Lived It.

Lemmon died on August 25, 1945, in the town he founded.
