= Leander Lemmon House =

- U.S. National Register of Historic Places
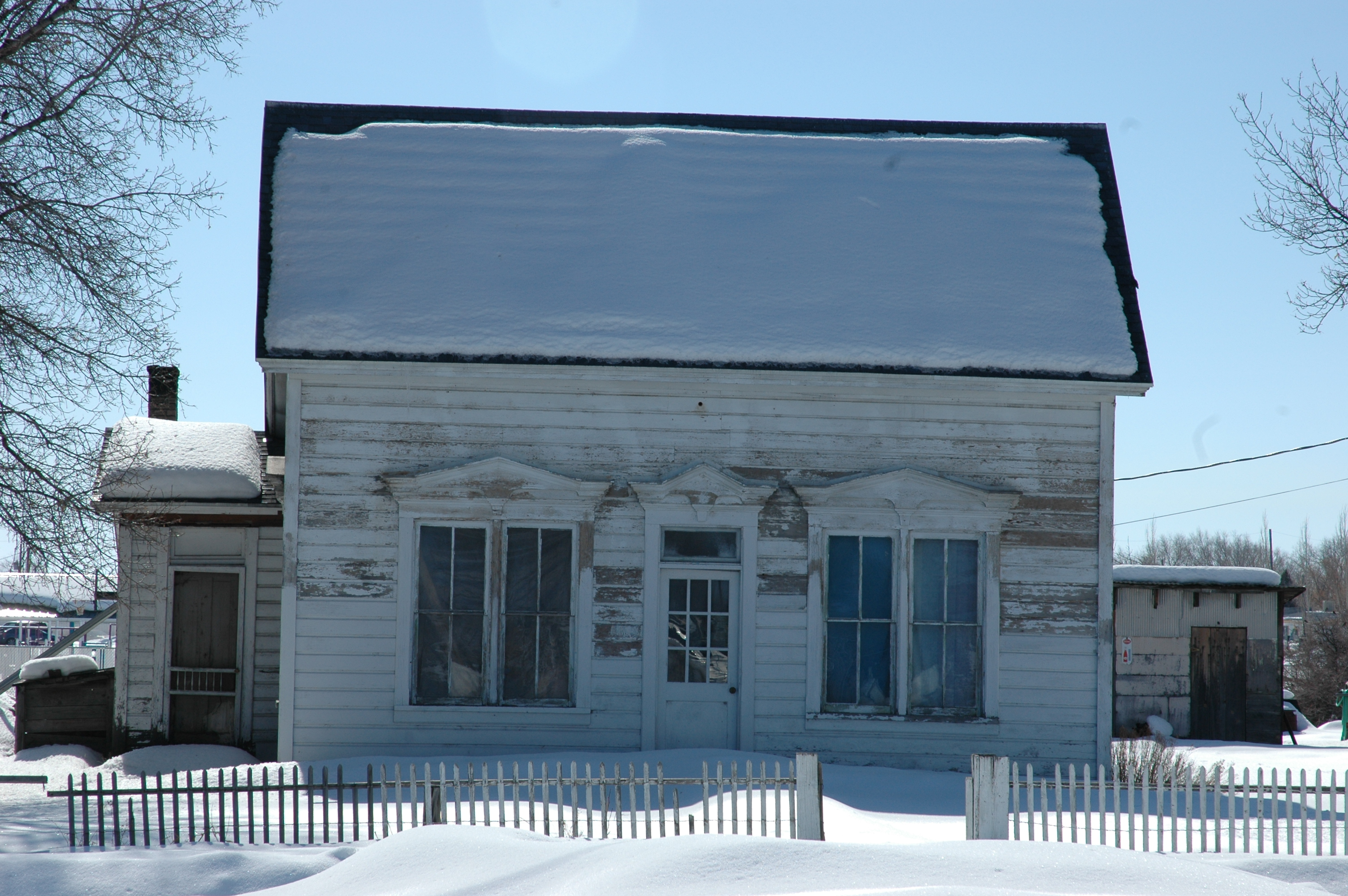

- Location within Utah Location within the United States
- Location: 45 West Center, Huntington, Utah
- Coordinates: 39°19′34″N 110°57′54″W
- Area: 0.7 acres (0.28 ha)
- Built: c.1901
- NRHP reference No.: 02001040
- Added to NRHP: September 12, 2002

The Leander Lemmon House, at 45 West Center in Huntington, Utah, was built around 1901. It was listed on the National Register of Historic Places in 2002.

It is a one-story wood frame hall and parlor plan house, built upon a stone foundation. An extension to the rear was added in the 1910s or 1920s.

It was deemed significant as "the only remaining residence of Leander Lemmon, one of the original settlers and founders of Huntington, Utah. Leander Lemmon, along with a few other stockmen, explored the Huntington area in 1874 in order to establish a cattle and sheep ranch. The following year Leander, along with James McHadden, settled in the area and after a few years had helped make the area habitable for other settlers. Although McHadden is credited with settling Castle Valley (where Huntington is located) he quickly moved on. Leander Lemmon was his partner at the time and stayed here to help establish Huntington, raise a family, and be an active participant in civic affairs; he resided here until his death in 1907. Leander constructed the first permanent residence on Huntington Creek, a one-room log cabin, in 1876, but this was later demolished. He and his wife Disrene moved to this house in c. 1901, and it remains the only residence that housed the first permanent Anglo resident of Huntington."
