= Thetis Lemmon =

American artist (1907–1987)

Thetis Lemmon (1907–1987) was an American artist, educator, and metal-smith active primarily in Texas during the 1930s and 1940s. She exhibited widely in regional and national exhibitions, working across media including oil painting, metalwork, jewelry, and wall hangings. Lemmon also served for more than a decade as a faculty member in the Fine Arts Department at Texas State College for Women.

== Early life and education ==
Thetis Lemmon was born in 1907 and educated in the Dallas Public School system. She attended Travis School (City Park School) before enrolling at Forest Avenue High School in Dallas, Texas.

Lemmon pursued higher education at Texas State College for Women (T.S.C.W.) in Denton, Texas (now Texas Woman’s University), where she earned a Bachelor of Science degree. During her senior year (1929), she was highly active in campus arts organizations. She served as art editor for both the Daedalian Quarterly and the Daedalian Annual, was a member of the Art Club and the Mary Eleanor Brackenridge Club, and graduated as a high honor student. She had a straight-A record for all 4 years of her education, achieving the best college record in the history of the university at the time. Her drawings appeared extensively throughout the 1929 yearbook.

She later attended Columbia University in New York City, where she earned a Master of Arts degree. While at Columbia, she studied painting under Charles Martin and spent four summers in New York working toward her master’s degree.

=== Academic career ===
Lemmon served for eleven years in the Fine Arts Department at Texas State College for Women. She taught courses including Freshman Drawing, metalworking, and jewelry design. Faculty records list her among early members of the department starting in 1929.

== Artistic career and exhibitions ==
Lemmon exhibited extensively between 1933 and 1941 in Texas and nationally. Her work included oil paintings as well as decorative and industrial metalwork.

=== Exhibitions ===
==== 1933 ====
- Modern Show, Provincetown, Massachusetts
- Architectural League, New York City (wall hangings: one painted, one appliqué)

==== 1934 ====
- Dallas Museum of Fine Arts (solo exhibition of jewelry, metalwork, and wall hangings)

==== 1936 ====
- Denton Art League – First Prize (Oil)
- Texas Centennial Exhibition, Dallas Museum of Fine Arts (Oil)
- Ney Museum, Austin (Oil)
- First National Exhibition of American Art, New York (Oil)

==== 1937 ====
- Pan-American Exhibition, Dallas Museum of Fine Arts (Oil)
- Denton Art League – First Prize (Oil)
- Dallas Museum of Fine Arts (Oils)
- Ney Museum, Austin (Oils)
- Second National Exhibition of American Art, New York (Oil)
- Midwestern Artists Exhibition, Kansas City (Oil)
- Exhibition of Contemporary Industrial and Handwrought Silver, Brooklyn Museum

==== 1938 ====
- Midwestern Artists Exhibition, Kansas City (Oil; work sold)
- Denton Art League (Oils, metalwork, jewelry)
- Texas Fine Arts Teachers’ Exhibit, Dallas Museum of Fine Arts (Oils)
- State Fair of Texas Exhibition, Dallas Museum of Fine Arts (Oils)

==== 1939 ====
- State Fair of Texas Exhibition, Dallas Museum of Fine Arts (Oils)
- Exhibition during inauguration of new president of the University of Texas, Austin (Oils)
- Preview of works entered for the New York World’s Fair
- Dallas Museum of Fine Arts (Oil)
- Denton Art League (Oils, metalwork, jewelry)

==== 1940 ====
- Five States Exhibition, Philbrook (Oil, 1940–41)
- Texas Fine Arts Association, New Museum, Austin (Oil)
- Traveling Exhibition of the Texas Fine Arts Association (Oil)

==== 1941 ====
- Texas–Oklahoma General Exhibit (Oil)
- Midwestern Artists Exhibition, Kansas City (Oil)
- Texas Fine Arts Association (Oils)
- West Texas Artists Association, Fort Worth (Oil)

=== Artistic style and media ===
Lemmon worked across multiple media, including:

- Oil painting
- Jewelry design
- Metalworking
- Wall hangings (painted and appliqué)

Her exhibition history reflects a dual engagement with fine art and decorative arts, particularly in silverwork and handwrought metal fields that gained prominence during the interwar period through craft revival movements and industrial design exhibitions.

== Legacy ==
Though not widely known today, Thetis Lemmon was an active participant in Texas’s interwar art scene. Her repeated inclusion in regional exhibitions, prize recognition from the Denton Art League, and participation in national exhibitions in New York and Kansas City indicate professional recognition during her career.

Her contributions as both artist and educator center her within the development of women’s art education and regional modernism in Texas during the 1930s and early 1940s.

=== Art on display ===
Thetis Lemmon has three pieces of artwork at the Dallas Museum of Art. The silver and New Zealand jade necklace is currently on display and is located at J. E. R. Chilton Gallery I, Level 1 of the Dallas Museum of Art.

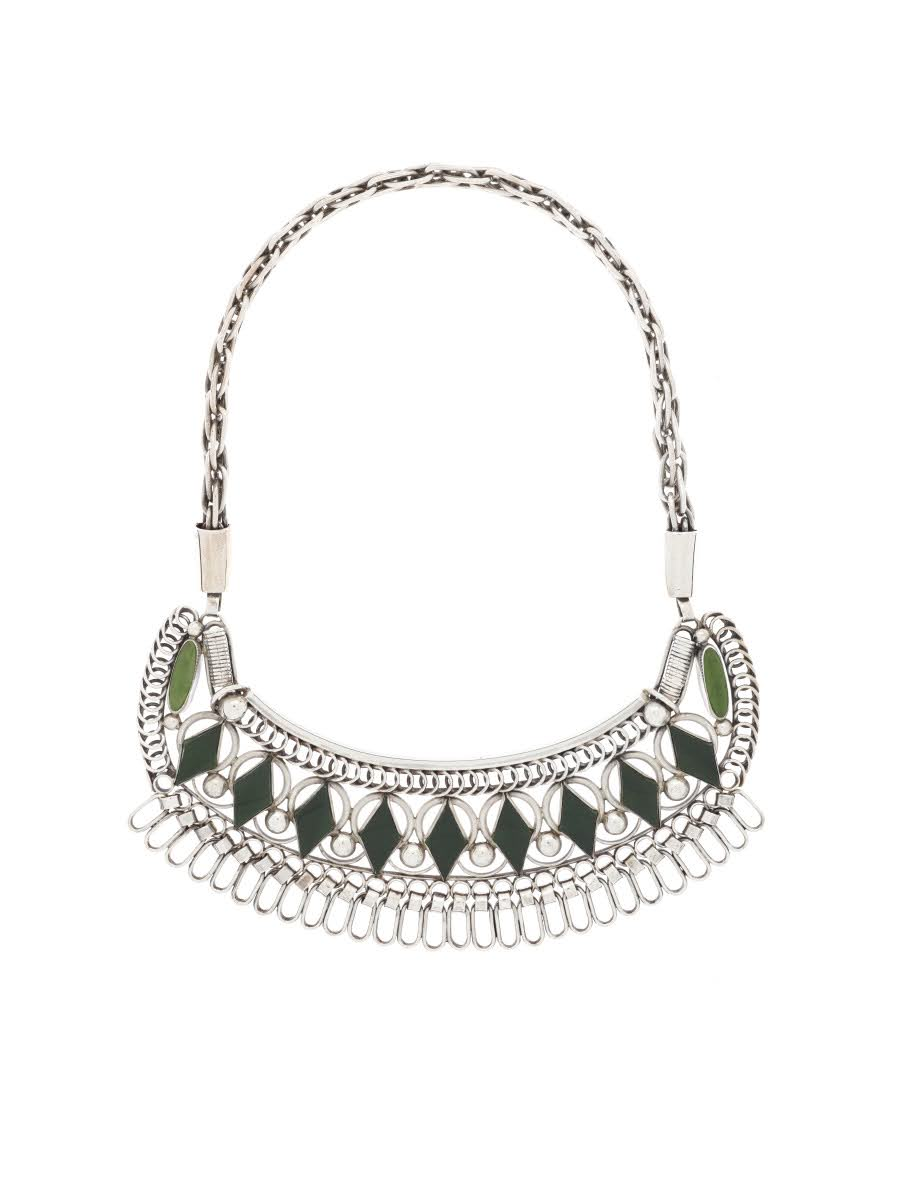
Silver and New Zealand Jade Necklace made by Thetis Lemmon c. 1948. Currently on display at the Dallas Museum of Art, gift of Hugh Bass.

=== Works previously at the Dallas Museum of Art ===
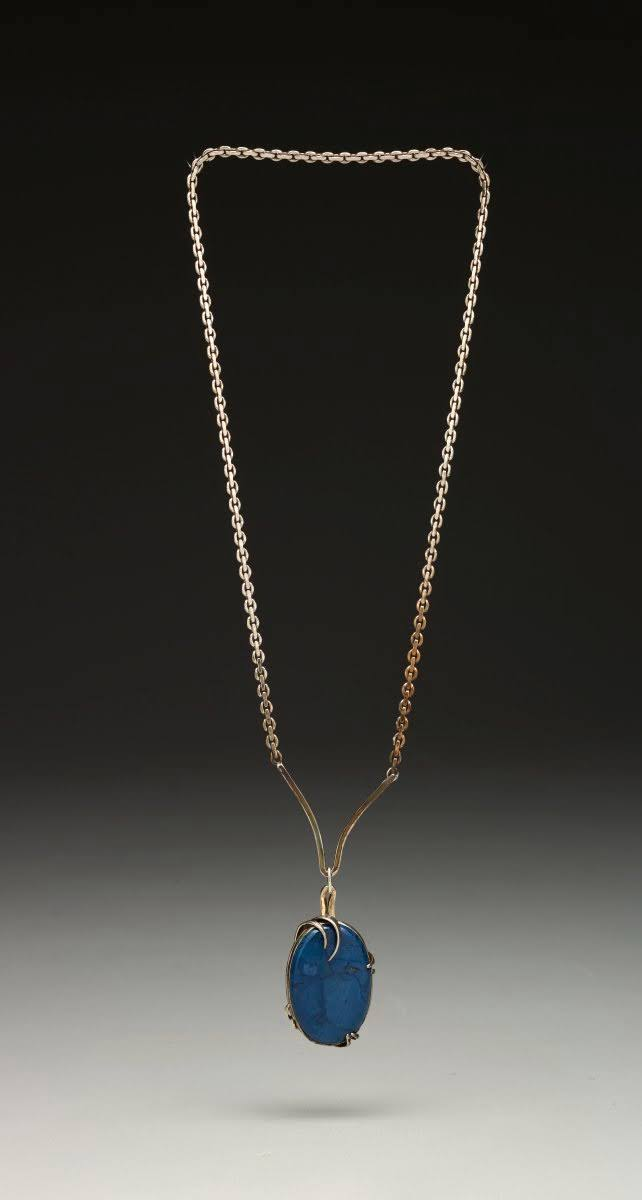
Lapis and silver necklace made by Thetis Lemmon c. 1950. Previously on display at the Dallas Museum of Art.

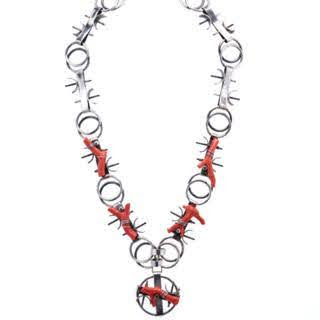
Coral and silver necklace created by Thetis Lemmon c. 1950. Previously on display at the Dallas Museum of Art.
