= Charlie Lemons =

English footballer

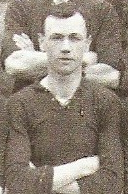

Personal information
- Full name: Charles George Lemons
- Date of birth: 3 December 1887
- Place of birth: Sheffield, England
- Date of death: 1952 (aged 64–65)
- Height: 5 ft 11 in (1.80 m)
- Positions: Striker; inside left

Senior career*
Years	Team	Apps	(Gls)
	Beighton Recreation	?	(?)
?–1921	Scunthorpe & Lindsey United	?	(?)
1921–1922	Lincoln City	22	(4)
1922–1923	York City	40	(5)
1923–?	Gainsborough Trinity	?	(?)
- * Club domestic league appearances and goals

Charles George Lemons (3 December 1887 – 1952) was an English footballer.

== Career ==
Lemons started his career with Beighton Recreation and joined Scunthorpe & Lindsey United around 1921. He was highly regarded with Scunthorpe, and he left the club in May 1921 to join Lincoln City for their first season in the Third Division North. He made 22 appearances and scored four goals for the club before joining York City prior to their first season in the Midland League in August 1922. He spent one season with the club, making 40 appearances and scoring five goals, before leaving for Gainsborough Trinity in July 1923, as it was nearer to his home in Lincolnshire.
