= William Lemon III =

American make-up artist (born 1978)

- Born: September 27, 1978 (age 47); San Jose, California
- Occupations: Make-up artist, musician
- Years active: 2005–present

William Lemon III (born September 27, 1978) is an American make-up artist, musician and fashion designer known for his special make-up effects used by celebrities including Lady Gaga and Rihanna.

== Early life ==
William Lemon was born in San Jose, California, and currently resides in Los Angeles. At the age of 20, Lemon joined the California Culinary Academy and has been cited to have been found inspiration for art through cooking.

== Career ==
Lemon has had a clientele including Lady Gaga, Rihanna, Alex Ebert, Julia Louis-Dreyfus, Ryan Gosling, and Chloë Sevigny.

Lemon who is a musician turned make-up artist, is best known for creating water-based acrylic body painting technique. He has also worked on music videos with artists including N.E.R.D's Hot-n-Fun and Beck's Gamma Ray featuring Chloë Sevigny. In 2011, Lemon received attention for his skeletal body art work with Lady Gaga for her Born this way video from the eponymous album.
