= Janet Hong =

Korean-Canadian translator

Janet Hong (Korean: 홍지명) is a writer and translator of Korean literature based in Vancouver, British Columbia, Canada. She has translated numerous works of fiction, essays, and graphic novels such as Keum Suk Gendry-Kim's Grass. Her translation of the graphic novel Moms by Yeong-shin Ma is set to be adapted for television by Playground Entertainment.

== Life and work ==
While studying English literature at the University of British Columbia, Hong began translating with the short story, The Woman Next Door by Ha Seong-nan. At the encouragement of a Korean language professor, she submitted the translation for The Korea Times Modern Korean Literature Translation Awards in 2001 and won the grand prize. She later received grants from the Literature Translation Institute of Korea to translate the rest of the collection. Eighteen years after its Korean publication, it was published by Open Letter Books as Flowers of Mold in 2019. Hong's second translation of Ha's fiction, Bluebeard's First Wife, was published the following summer with a grant from the Daesan Foundation. She became a judge of the newspaper's translation award herself in 2024.

In addition to graduating from the University of Guelph with an MFA in creative writing, Hong's translations have garnered numerous accolades and praise, including the PEN/Heim Translation Fund Grants for her translation of Han Yujoo's The Impossible Fairy Tale and two Harvey Awards for Best International Book. Hong's work in the challenges of translating onomatopoetic phases and puns from Korean into English has been of noted success, such as the wordplay in Lemon by Kwon Yeo-sun.

"One formidable translation challenge to which Hong rises comes just three pages in, when Sanghui ponders the nickname given to the suspected killer Han Manu. Its source is Cho Yong-pil’s late-1970s ballad “Han-o-baeg-nyeon” (한오백년): to Manu’s classmates, “the opening words ‘ha-an-man-eu-eu-eun’ sounded just like his name. If you slurred the n sound so that you said ‘ha-an-man-u–u–u‘ instead, it was perfect.”

She has credited in part the rise of translated Korean literature to the commercial success and visibility of Please Look After Mom by Shin Kyung-sook, as well as Han Kang's The Vegetarian winning the 2016 International Booker Prize.

In September 2021, it was announced that Hong would be the Korean prose mentor for the American Literary Translators Association Emerging Translator Mentorship Program.

== Translations ==
- Ancco (2018), Bad Friends, Montreal, Quebec: Drawn & Quarterly, ISBN 9781770463295
- Ancco (2020), Nineteen, Montreal, Quebec: Drawn & Quarterly, ISBN 9781770464100
- Gendry-Kim, Keum Suk (2019), Grass, Montreal, Quebec: Drawn & Quarterly, ISBN 9781770463622
- Gendry-Kim, Keum Suk (2021), The Waiting, Montreal, Quebec: Drawn & Quartlery, ISBN 9781770465718
- Ha, Seong-nan (2020), Bluebeard's First Wife, Rochester, NY: Open Books Press, ISBN 9781948830171
- Ha, Seong-nan (2019), Flowers of Mold, Rochester, NY: Open Letter Books, ISBN 9781940953960
- Han, Yujoo (2017), The Impossible Fairy Tale, Minneapolis, MN: Graywolf Press, ISBN 9781555977665
- Han, Yujoo (2019), Left's Right, Right's Left, Norwich: Strangers Press, ISBN 9781911343653
- Hong, Yeon-shik (2020), Umma's Table, Montreal, Quebec: Drawn & Quarterly, ISBN 9781770463868
- Kwon, Yeo-sun (2021), Lemon, New York, NY: Other Press, ISBN 9781635420890
- Yeong-shin, Ma (2020). Moms. Drawn & Quarterly. ISBN 978-1-77046-400-1.
- Yeong-shin, Ma (2022), Artist, Montreal, Quebec: Drawn & Quarterly
