= G.E. Lemmon House =

Historic house in South Dakota, United States

- G. E. Lemmon House
- U.S. National Register of Historic Places
- Location within South Dakota Location within the United States
- Location: 507 3rd Ave., W, Lemmon, South Dakota
- Coordinates: 45°56′21″N 102°09′43″W
- Area: less than one acre
- Built: 1908
- NRHP reference No.: 76001754
- Added to NRHP: December 12, 1976

The G. E. Lemmon House, at 507 3rd Ave., W, in Lemmon, South Dakota, was built in 1908. It was listed on the National Register of Historic Places in 1976.

It is significant for association with G.E. Lemmon, remembered as "the embodiment of what a real cowboy was, rather than the mythical image many believe." Among other achievements, Lemmon handled the most cattle in one day, over 900, in "cutting out, roping and carrying to fire for branding", according to the National Livestock Association.
