= Lemons, Missouri =

Unincorporated area in Missouri, US

Coordinates: 40°24′15″N 93°02′51″W

Lemons is a town located in Putnam County, Missouri.

== History ==
Lemons was originally spelled "Lemen Station", and under the latter name was platted in 1877 by Abraham Lemen, and named for him. Other variant names were "Xenia", "Leman Station", "Lemen", "Lemenville", "Lemons Station", and "Lemonville". A post office called Lemen was established in 1876, the name was changed to Lemon Station in 1876, and closed in 1878. The post reopened as Xenia in 1879, renamed Lemonville in 1898, again was renamed Lemons in 1915, and the post office closed permanently in 1975.
