= Tim Lemons =

American politician

Member of the Arkansas House of Representatives from the 43rd district
- In office January 2015 – 2019
- Preceded by: Davy Carter
- Succeeded by: Brian S. Evans

Personal details
- Born: 1962 (age 63–64) Monticello, Arkansas
- Party: Republican
- Spouse: Janice C. Lemons
- Children: Erica and Seth Lemons
- Education: Louisiana Tech University
- Occupation: Civil engineer

Timothy Boyd Lemons (born 1962) is a self-employed civil engineer from Cabot, Arkansas, who was a Republican member of the Arkansas House of Representatives for District 43 in Lonoke County from 2015 to 2019. He was elected in 2014 to succeed the term-limited Davy Carter, a Cabot businessman who from 2013 to 2014 was the House Speaker. In his first term in office, Lemons sat on the committees for (1) Revenue and Taxation, (2) City, County and Local Affairs, and (3) Joint Committee on Energy.

Lemons graduated from Louisiana Tech University in Ruston, Louisiana. He is affiliated with the Cabot Chamber of Commerce, the National Rifle Association, the Lonoke County Republican Committee, Kiwanis International, the Lonoke Exceptional Development Center. He and his wife, Janice, have two children. He is a Baptist.

In February 2015, Lemons joined dozens of his fellow Republicans and two Democrats in co-sponsoring legislation submitted by Representative Lane Jean to reduce unemployment compensation benefits. The measure was promptly signed into law by Governor Asa Hutchinson.

| Preceded by Davy Carter | Arkansas State Representative for District 43 (Lonoke County); 2015–2019 | Succeeded by Brian Evans |
