= Kim Burningham =

American educator, politician, and education advocate (1936–2017)

Member of the Utah House of Representatives from the 19th district
- In office 1979 – July 19, 1994
- Preceded by: David Irvine
- Succeeded by: Sheryl Allen

Personal details
- Born: Kim R. Burningham; September 14, 1936 Bountiful, Utah, U.S.
- Died: July 7, 2017 (aged 80)
- Party: Republican
- Spouse: Susan Ball Clarke Burningham
- Children: 2
- Education: University of Utah (BS); University of Arizona (MA); University of Southern California (MFA)
- Occupation: Educator, politician

Kim R. Burningham (September 14, 1936 – July 7, 2017) was an American educator, politician, and advocate for public education and government ethics in Utah. He served fifteen years in the Utah House of Representatives and later spent sixteen years on the Utah State Board of Education, including seven years as chairman. Burningham became known throughout Utah for his advocacy of public-school funding, opposition to school vouchers, and leadership in government ethics reform efforts.

== Early life and education ==
Burningham was born in Bountiful, Utah. He graduated from Davis High School and earned a bachelor's degree from the University of Utah, a master's degree from the University of Arizona, and a Master of Fine Arts degree from the University of Southern California.

== Teaching career ==
Before entering full-time public service, Burningham spent twenty-seven years teaching speech, debate, drama, theatre, and English at Bountiful High School. He also coached debate teams and directed school theatrical productions.

Former students described Burningham as one of the school's most influential teachers. Attorney and community activist David Irvine, a former student, recalled that some former students returned to the Bountiful area so their children could also attend his classes.

== Political career ==
Burningham was elected to the Utah House of Representatives in 1978 and served from 1979 until July 1994, representing Utah's 19th House district.

During his legislative tenure, Burningham became known for his work on public education policy, strategic planning, and government accountability.

Education funding was one of Burningham's principal legislative interests. In 1991, he sponsored House Concurrent Resolution 4, urging revisions to federal education-funding formulas that he argued disadvantaged Utah schoolchildren.

In 1994, Burningham sponsored House Bill 90, legislation establishing licensing standards and qualifications for mental-health practitioners. The bill emerged from negotiations among psychologists, clinical social workers, family therapists, and other mental-health professionals.

== Utah State Board of Education ==
Following his legislative service, Burningham served approximately sixteen years on the Utah State Board of Education and seven years as chairman.

As chairman, he became one of Utah's most prominent opponents of school-voucher programs. He led the board's legal challenge to the state's voucher law and subsequently became a leading advocate during the statewide referendum campaign on the issue.

Burningham promoted efforts to improve teacher quality through mentoring and professional-development initiatives. He also helped foster collaboration between Utah's K–12 and higher-education systems through the creation of the K–16 Alliance.

== Ethics reform advocacy ==
After leaving the Legislature, Burningham became active in government ethics reform efforts. He served as chairman of Utahns for Ethical Government, a citizen organization established to promote stronger ethics laws, transparency measures, and independent oversight of elected officials.

According to the Deseret News, Burningham helped organize the group in 2009 alongside former legislators and civic activists after concerns over the effectiveness of legislative ethics oversight. The organization subsequently pursued a statewide ballot initiative aimed at strengthening ethics laws.

A 2010 Salt Lake Tribune article identified Burningham as chairman and chief public spokesman for the organization during its reform campaigns.

== National education leadership ==
Burningham served as president of the National Association of State Boards of Education (NASBE) in 2003 after serving as president-elect. He also served on the organization's board of directors and received the NASBE Distinguished Service Award for contributions to public education.

== Personal life ==
Burningham married Susan Ball Clarke in 1968, and they had two sons.

Outside politics and education, he was known for his interest in gardening, community service, and civic affairs.

== Death and legacy ==
Burningham died on July 7, 2017, at age 80.

Obituaries published following his death highlighted his influence as a teacher, legislator, school-board leader, public-education advocate, and ethics reformer. The Salt Lake Tribune described him as a champion of public education, ethics, and political moderation in Utah public life.
