= North American Rock Garden Society =

The North American Rock Garden Society (NARGS) is a society founded to promote rock gardening in North America. Specifically, it encourages and promotes:

- The cultivation, conservation and knowledge of rock garden plants, their value, habits and geographic distribution.
- Interest in good design and construction of rock gardens, crevice gardens, and container gardens.
- Image capture and display, especially of plants and plant habitats.
- Meetings and exhibitions.
- Plant explorations and introduction of new species and forms.
- Study of history and literature on the subject.
- Acquaintance between members and groups with the resultant mutual exchange of experience and knowledge.

The society has 40 chapters across the United States and Canada.

After organizing meetings in 1933, the society was founded on March 21, 1934, during a New York City gathering as the American Rock Garden Society. Organizing members included Dorothy Hansell, editor of the Gardener's Chronicle of America, Martha Houghton, Florens DeBevoise, Thomas H. Everett, horticulturalist at The New York Botanical Garden, and Montague Free, head gardener at the Brooklyn Botanic Garden. The first members chose the American alpine plant shooting star, Dodecatheon, as the society's symbol.

The society has run an annual seed exchange since 1936.
