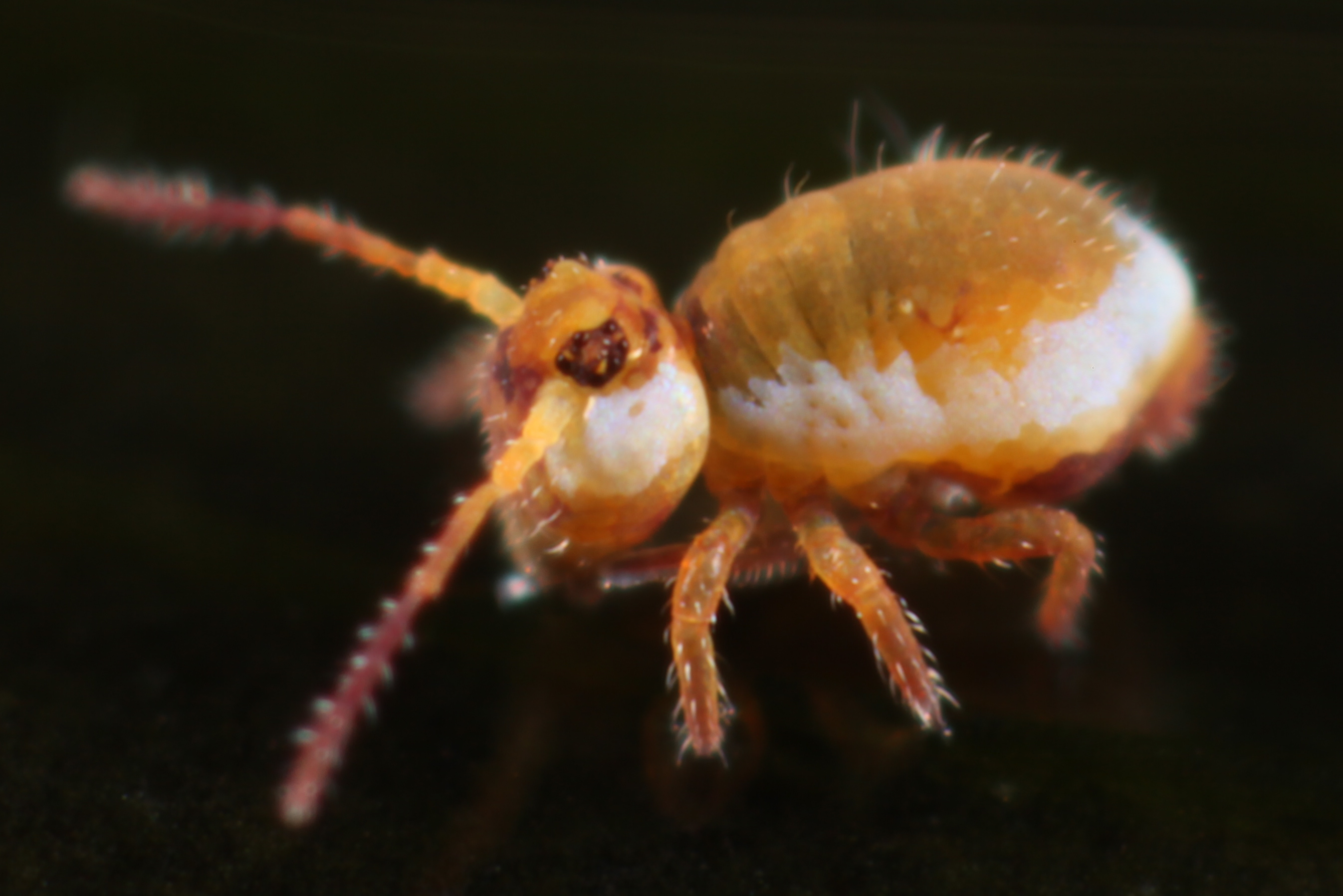

Scientific classification
- Domain: Eukaryota
- Kingdom: Animalia
- Phylum: Arthropoda
- Class: Collembola
- Order: Symphypleona
- Family: Sminthurididae
- Genus: Sminthurides
- Species: S. bifidus

Binomial name
- Sminthurides bifidus Mills, 1934

= Sminthurides bifidus =

Species of springtail

Sminthurides bifidus is a species of globular springtail in the family Sminthurididae.

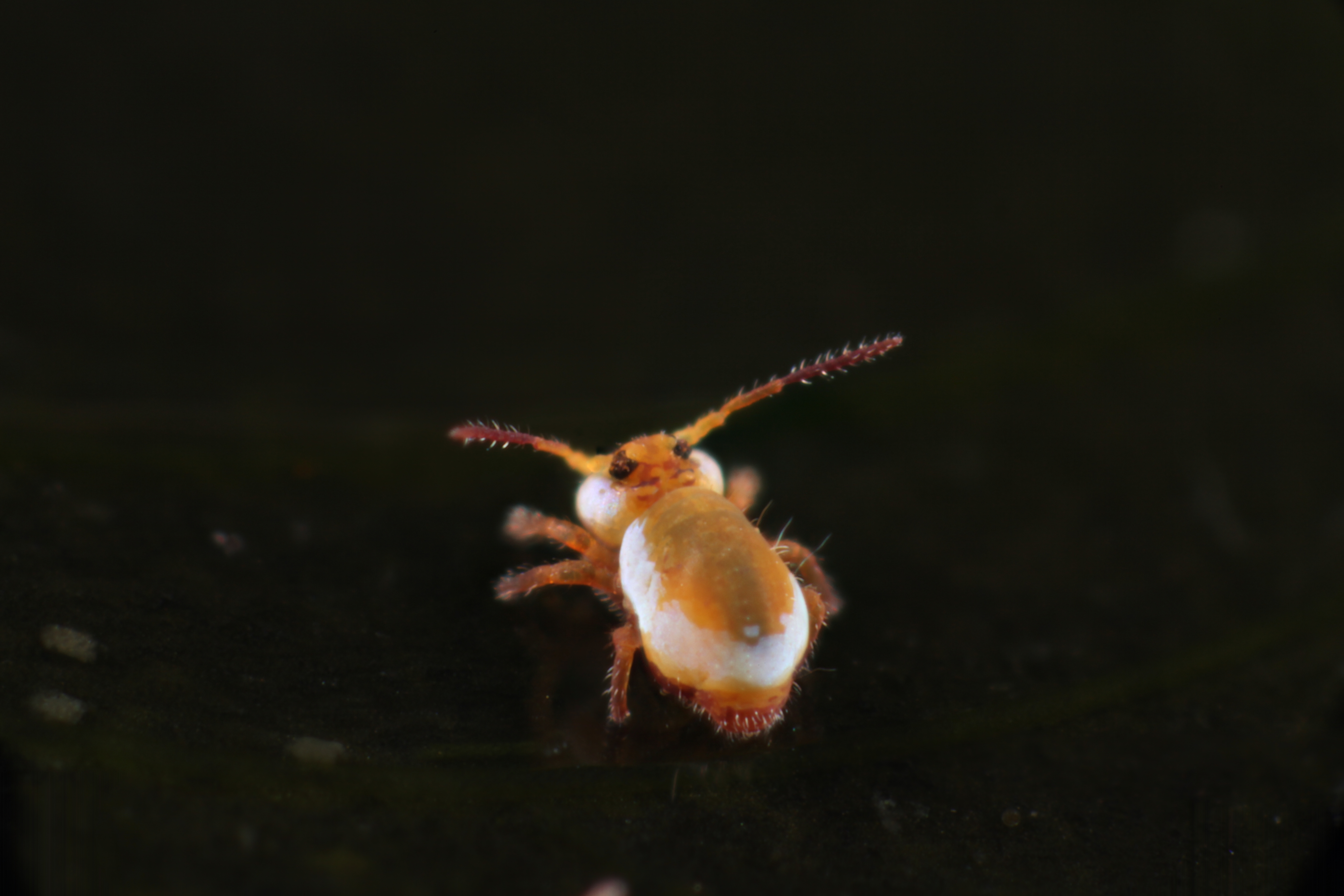
