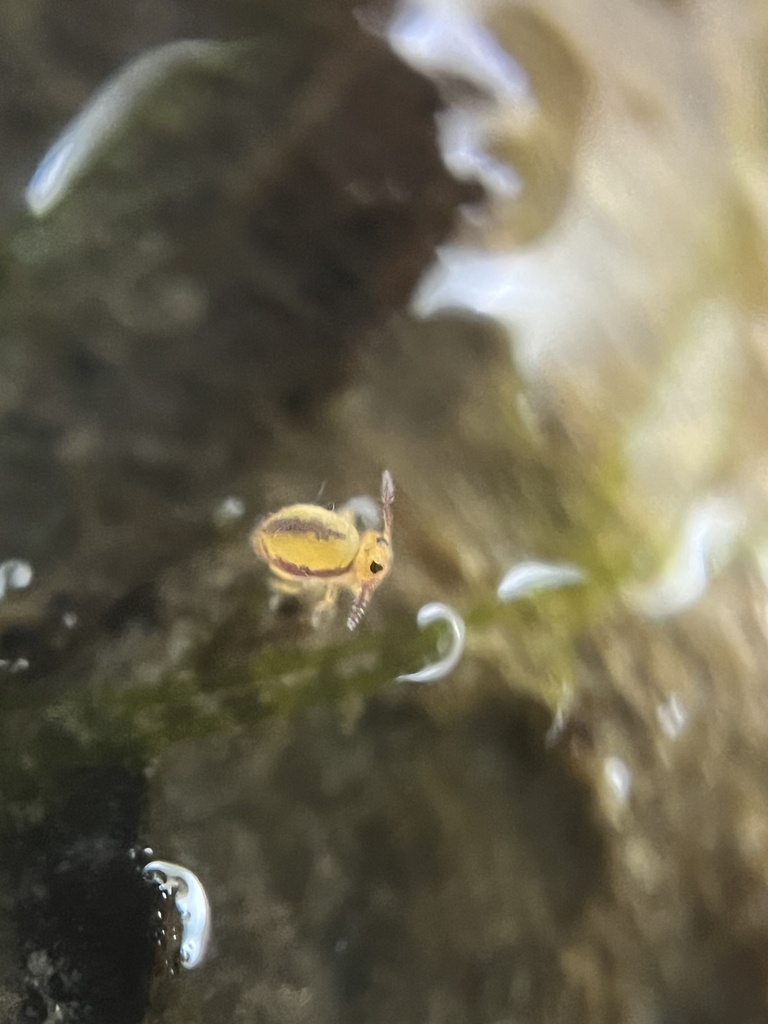

Scientific classification
- Kingdom: Animalia
- Phylum: Arthropoda
- Clade: Pancrustacea
- Class: Collembola
- Order: Symphypleona
- Family: Sminthurididae
- Genus: Sminthurides
- Species: S. malmgreni

Binomial name
- Sminthurides malmgreni T.Tullberg, 1877

= Sminthurides malmgreni =

Species of springtail

Sminthurides malmgreni, commonly known as Malmgren's springtail, is a species of puddle springtail in the genus Sminthurides found in the United States and Europe.

It is found on standing water, on top of puddles or under wet leaves.

The antenna of this species is shaped like bicycle handles in the males, while females of this species have normal looking antenna for the genus. The appearance is variable, but is always a variation on a black middle dorsal spot in the middle of a yellowish overall body.
