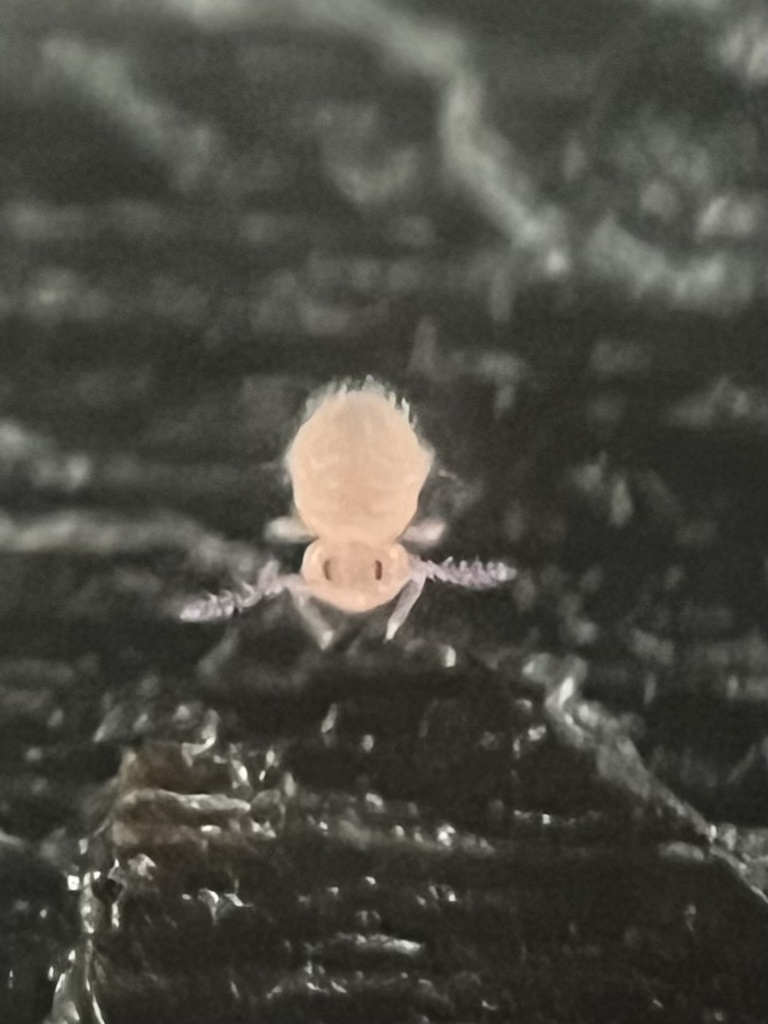
- Sphaeridia pumilis found in Washington state under a log
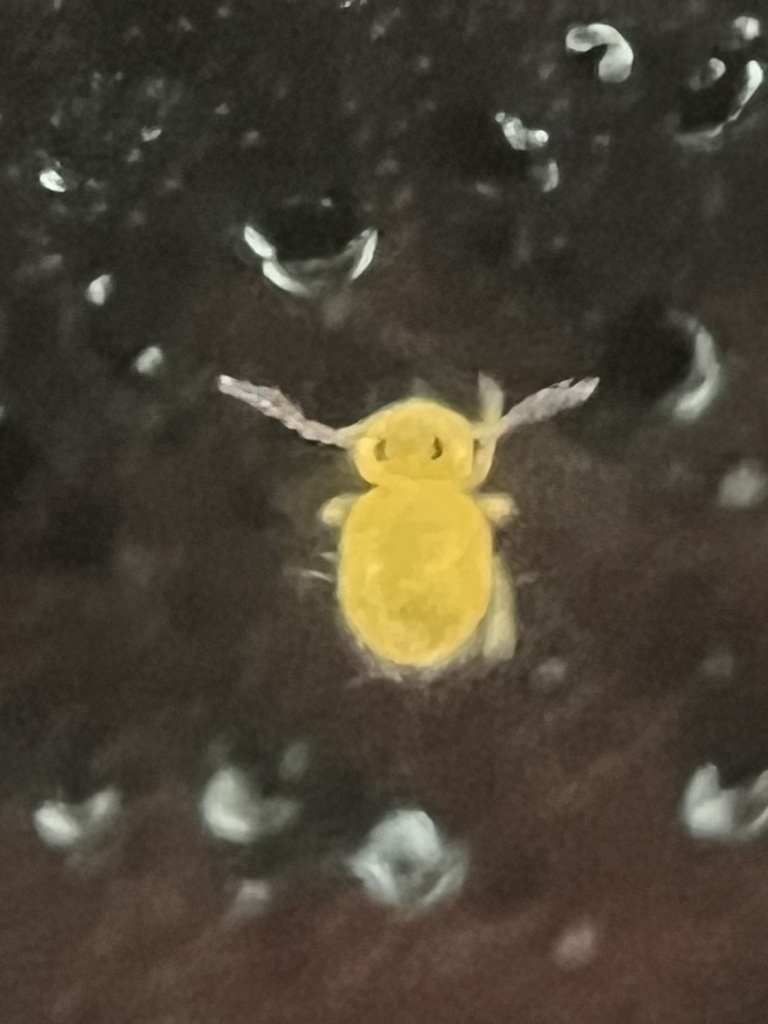
- The yellow form of Sphaeridia pumilis

Scientific classification
- Kingdom: Animalia
- Phylum: Arthropoda
- Class: Collembola
- Order: Symphypleona
- Family: Sminthurididae
- Genus: Sphaeridia
- Species: S. pumilis

Binomial name
- Sphaeridia pumilis (Krausbauer, 1898)

= Sphaeridia pumilis =

Species of springtail

Sphaeridia pumilis is a springtail in the genus Sphaeridia found in Europe, Canada and the United States.

== Habitat ==
This springtail is found under logs, under leaf litter, and even on the top of puddles.

== Appearance ==
The overall appearance of this springtail is an overall red, pink, or white springtail the size of a salt grain. It has more or less distinct square to rectangular eyes. The antenna are three segmented and the last two segments turn slightly to the side.

This species has multiple color forms, that become more intense as the springtails mature, the most common form in the Western United States being the pink, yellow and white forms. The dark red/magenta form is another rarer form that pops up across the entirety of this species's range, but is definitely more common in European countries and Eastern North America.
