= Sminthurides weichseli =

Scientific classification
- Domain: Eukaryota
- Kingdom: Animalia
- Phylum: Arthropoda
- Class: Collembola
- Order: Symphypleona
- Family: Sminthurididae
- Genus: Sminthurides
- Species: S. weichseli

Binomial name
- Sminthurides weichseli Christiansen & Bellinger, 1981

Species of springtail

Sminthurides weichseli is a species of globular springtail in the family Sminthurididae.
