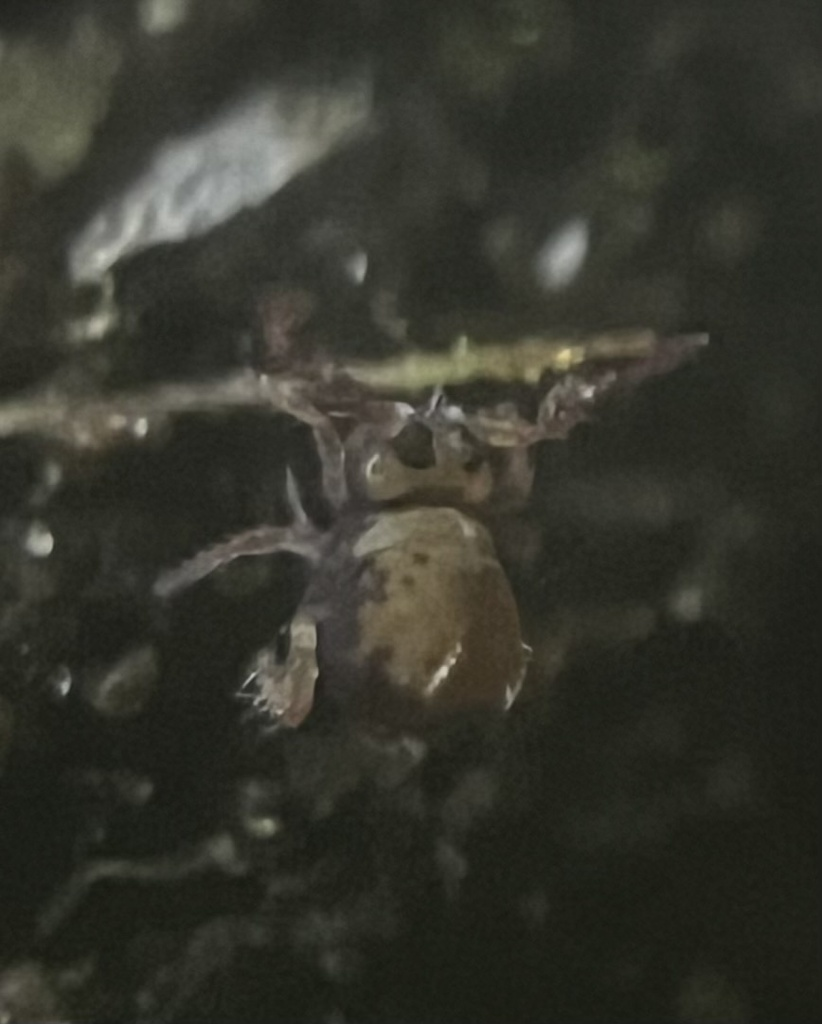
- Stenacidia violacea found in Washington State soil on the side of a trail

Scientific classification
- Kingdom: Animalia
- Phylum: Arthropoda
- Clade: Pancrustacea
- Class: Collembola
- Order: Symphypleona
- Family: Sminthurididae
- Genus: Stenacidia
- Species: S. violacea

Binomial name
- Stenacidia violacea (O.M.Reuter, 1881)

= Stenacidia violacea =

Species of springtail

Stenacidia violacea is a species of springtail found within a Nearctic distribution. It is most commonly found in the United States, Canada and Europe. It was recently also discovered in Iran in 2019.

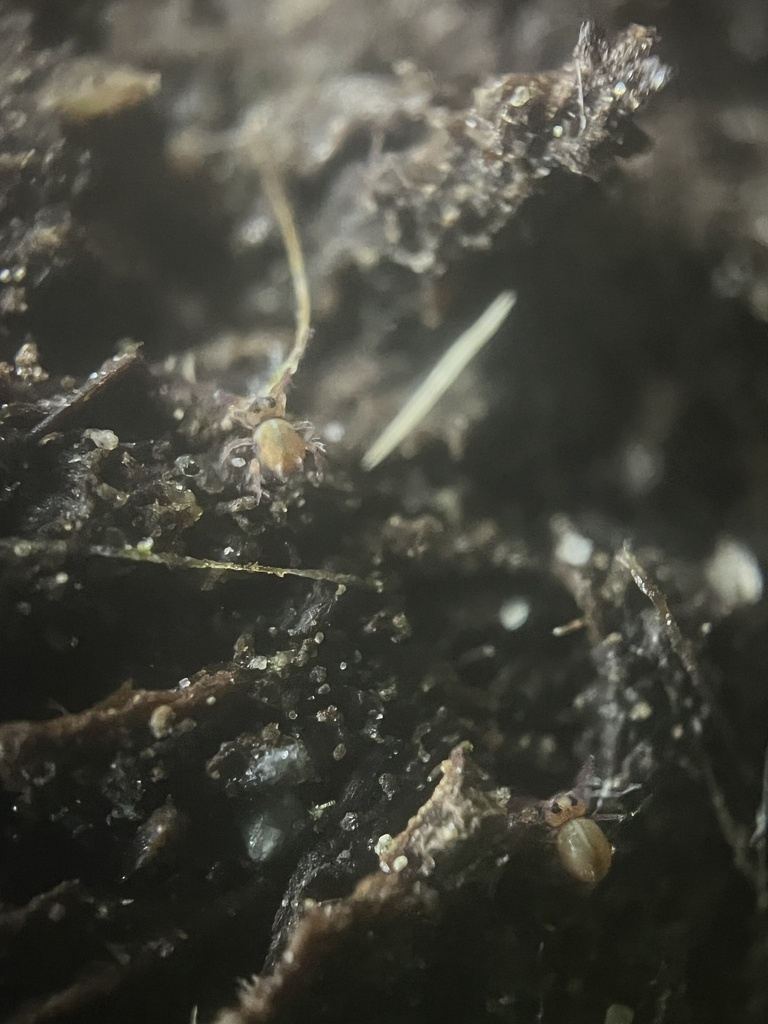
Two Stenacidia violacea individuals, showing their stripe patterns

These springtails are yellowish overall in coloration, with purple sides. the antenna are bike shaped to straight. when these springtails mate, they bring their antennas together, in what looks like a kiss. there is a white stripe down the middle of the springtail. It can also be dark purple in the females of the species.
