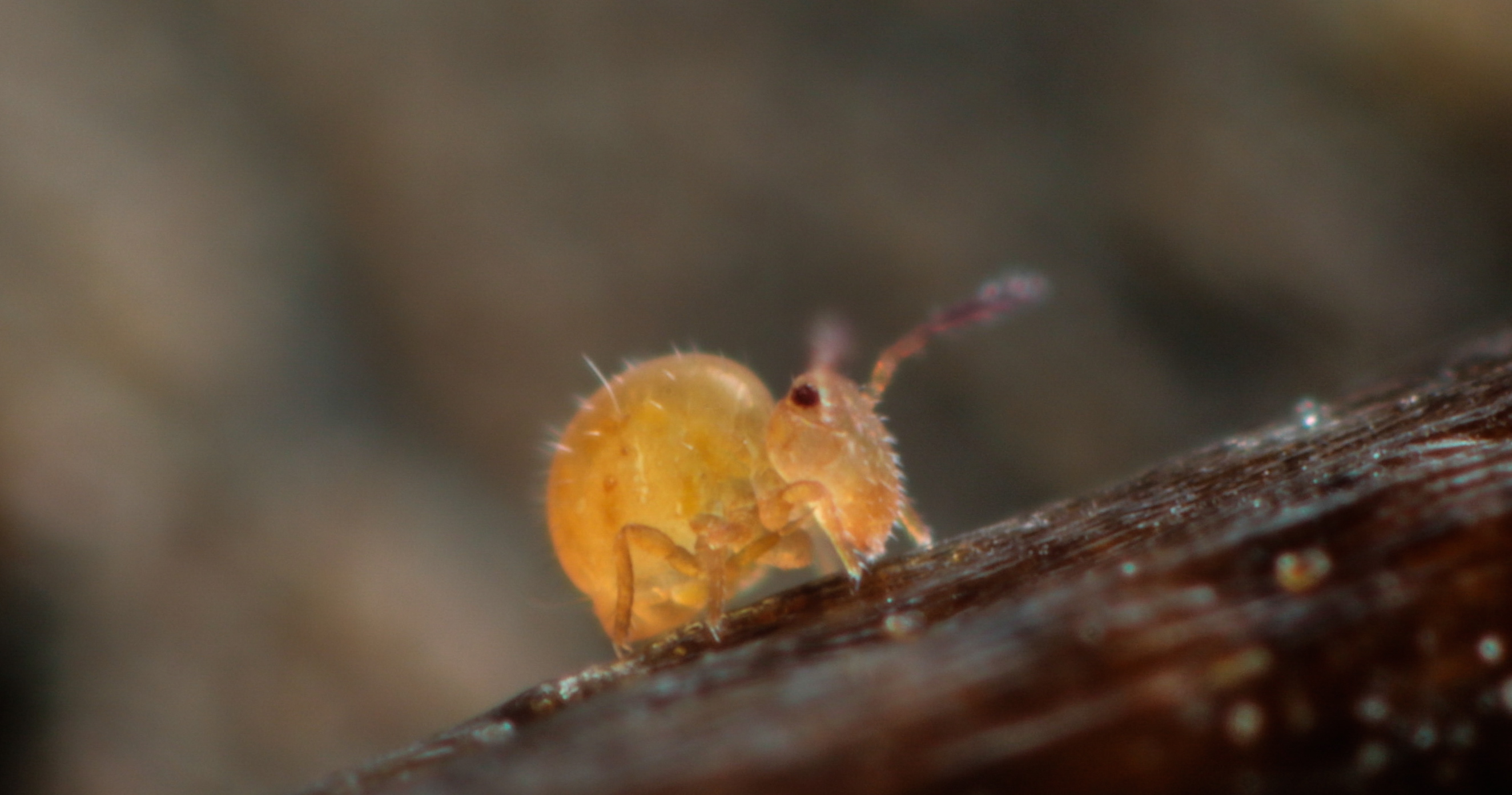
- Sphaeridia pumilis

Scientific classification
- Kingdom: Animalia
- Phylum: Arthropoda
- Class: Collembola
- Order: Symphypleona
- Family: Sminthurididae
- Genus: Sphaeridia; Linnaniemi, 1912

Synonyms
- Asphyrotheca Stach, 1956; Indotheca Stach, 1956; Sminthurides Börner, 1901; Sphaerida Russell, 2008

= Sphaeridia =

Genus of springtails

Sphaeridia is a genus of springtails belonging to the family Sminthurididae.

The species of this genus are found in Europe and Northern America.

== Species ==
Species:

- Sphaeridia aserrata Mari Mutt, 1987
- Sphaeridia asiatica Rusek, 1971
- Sphaeridia aspinosa Bretfeld & Trinklein, 2000
- Sphaeridia betschi Arlé, 1984
- Sphaeridia biclava Bretfeld & Trinklein, 2000
- Sphaeridia biniserrata Salmon, 1951
- Sphaeridia bivirgata Bretfeld, 2002
- Sphaeridia boettgeri Bretfeld & Gauer, 1994
- Sphaeridia cardosi Arlé, 1984
- Sphaeridia carioca Arlé, 1984
- Sphaeridia catapulta Bretfeld & Gauer, 1994
- Sphaeridia carastes Bretfeld & Gauer, 1994
- Sphaeridia chisacae Bretfeld & Gauer, 1994
- Sphaeridia clara Bretfeld & Gauer, 1994
- Sphaeridia coronata Bretfeld & Gauer, 1994
- Sphaeridia decemdigitata Bretfeld & Schulz, 2012
- Sphaeridia delamarei Bretfeld, 1997
- Sphaeridia denisi Christiansen, 1998
- Sphaeridia duckei Bretfeld, 2002
- Sphaeridia fibulifera Bretfeld & Gauer, 1994
- Sphaeridia fluminensis Arlé, 1984
- Sphaeridia pumilis
