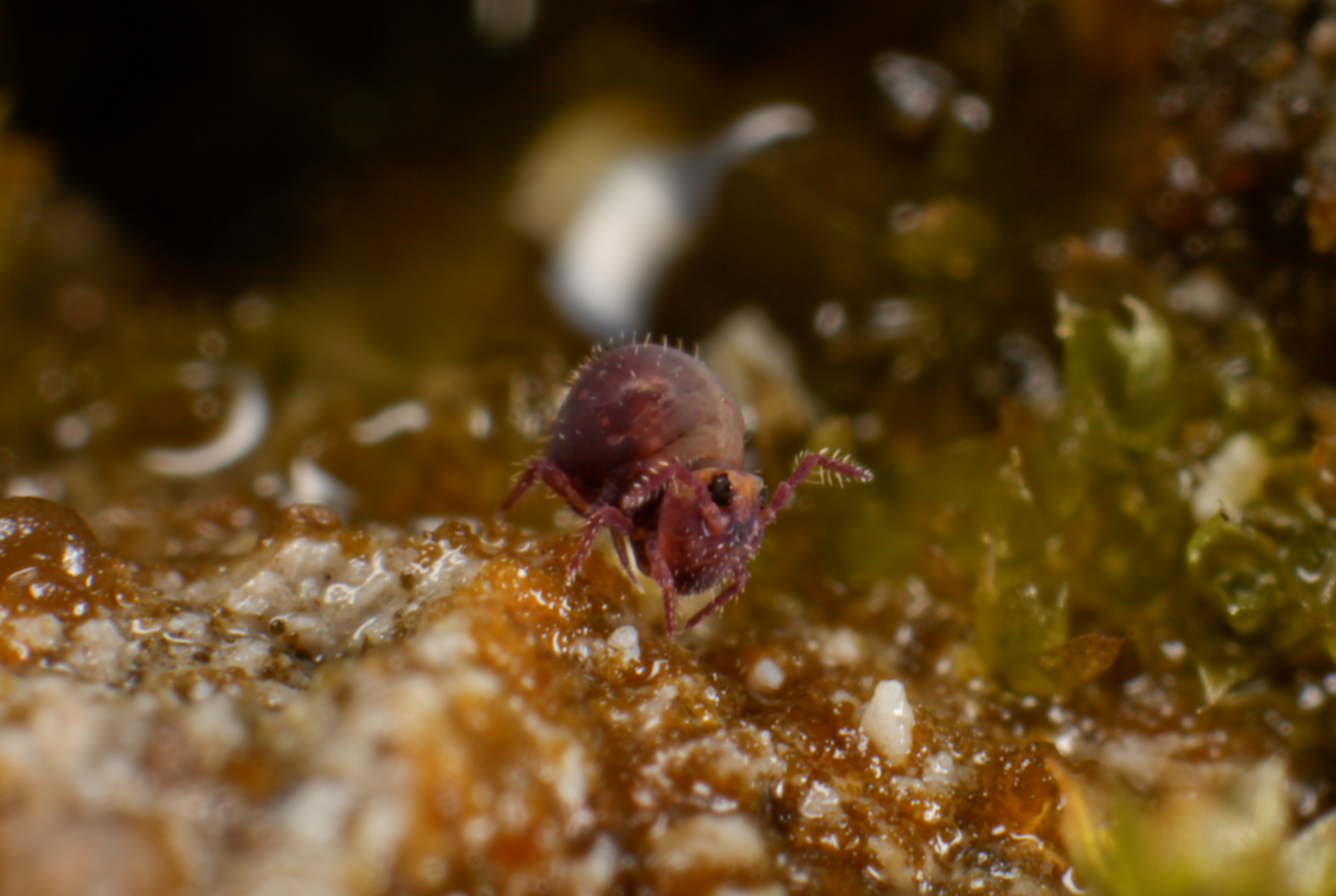
- Stenacidia Violacea

Scientific classification
- Kingdom: Animalia
- Phylum: Arthropoda
- Class: Collembola
- Order: Symphypleona
- Family: Sminthurididae
- Genus: Stenacidia; C.Börner, 1906

= Stenacidia =

Genus of springtails

Stenacidia is a genus of springtails described by C. Börner in 1906. They are primarily found in Europe.

The genus consists of four species:

- Stenacidia picta (Yosii, 1966)
- Stenacidia stachi (Jeannenot, 1955)
- Stenacidia violacea (O.M.Reuter, 1881)
