= Denisiella =

Scientific classification
- Kingdom: Animalia
- Phylum: Arthropoda
- Clade: Pancrustacea
- Class: Collembola
- Order: Symphypleona
- Family: Sminthurididae
- Genus: Denisiella; Folsom & Mills, 1938

Genus of globular springtails in the family Sminthurididae

Denisiella is a genera of globular springtails in the family Sminthurididae. It contains 13 species, eight of which are from the Neotropical region.
