= Sminthurides =

- Sminthurides aquaticus

Scientific classification
- Domain: Eukaryota
- Kingdom: Animalia
- Phylum: Arthropoda
- Class: Collembola
- Order: Symphypleona
- Family: Sminthurididae
- Genus: Sminthurides; Boener, 1900

Genus of springtails

Sminthurides is a genus of globular springtails in the family Sminthurididae. There are more than 30 described species in Sminthurides.

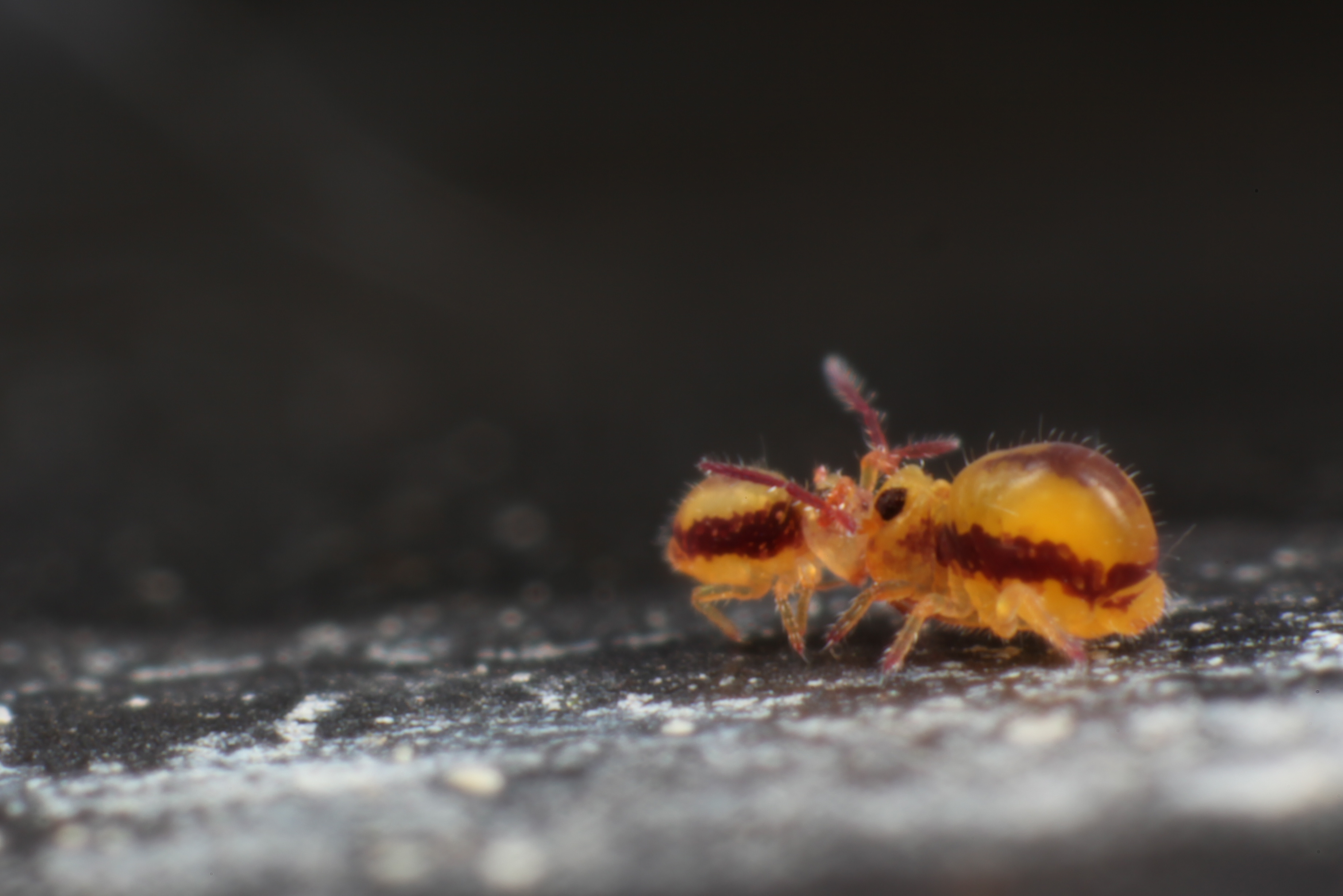
Sminthurides malmgreni

== Species ==
These 32 species belong to the genus Sminthurides:

- Sminthurides annulicornis Axelson, 1905
- Sminthurides aquatica (Bourlet, 1843)
- Sminthurides aquaticus (Bourlet, 1843) (water springtail)
- Sminthurides armatus Bretfeld, 2000
- Sminthurides assimilis (Krausbauer, 1898)
- Sminthurides aureolus Maynard, 1951
- Sminthurides bifidus Mills, 1934
- Sminthurides biniserratus (Salmon, 1951)
- Sminthurides cruciatus Axelson, 1905
- Sminthurides globocerus Folsom & Mills, 1938
- Sminthurides hyogramme Pedigo, 1966
- Sminthurides inaequalis Borner, 1903
- Sminthurides inequalis
- Sminthurides lepus Mills, 1934
- Sminthurides lolelua Christiansen & Bellinger, 1992
- Sminthurides macnamarai Folsom & Mills, 1938
- Sminthurides malmgreni (Tullberg, 1877)
- Sminthurides monnioti Massoud & Betsch, 1966
- Sminthurides occultus Mills, 1934
- Sminthurides parvulus (Krausbauer, 1898)
- Sminthurides penicillifer (Schäffer, 1896)
- Sminthurides plicatus (Schott, 1891)
- Sminthurides pseudassimilis Stach, 1956
- Sminthurides pumilus (Krausbauer, 1898)
- Sminthurides ramosus (Folsom, 1922)
- Sminthurides schoetti Axelson, 1903
- Sminthurides serratus Folsom & Mills, 1938
- Sminthurides sexoculatus Betsch & Massoud, 1970
- Sminthurides stachi Jeannenot, 1955
- Sminthurides terrestris Maynard, 1951
- Sminthurides violaceus Reuter, 1881
- Sminthurides weichseli Christiansen & Bellinger, 1981
