= Sminthurididae =

- Sminthurides aquaticus

Scientific classification
- Kingdom: Animalia
- Phylum: Arthropoda
- Class: Collembola
- Order: Symphypleona
- Family: Sminthurididae; Börner, 1906

Family of springtails

Sminthurididae (Börner, 1906), not to be confounded with: Sminthuridae (Lubbock, 1862), is a family of globular springtails in the order Symphypleona. There are about 5 genera and more than 40 described species in Sminthurididae.

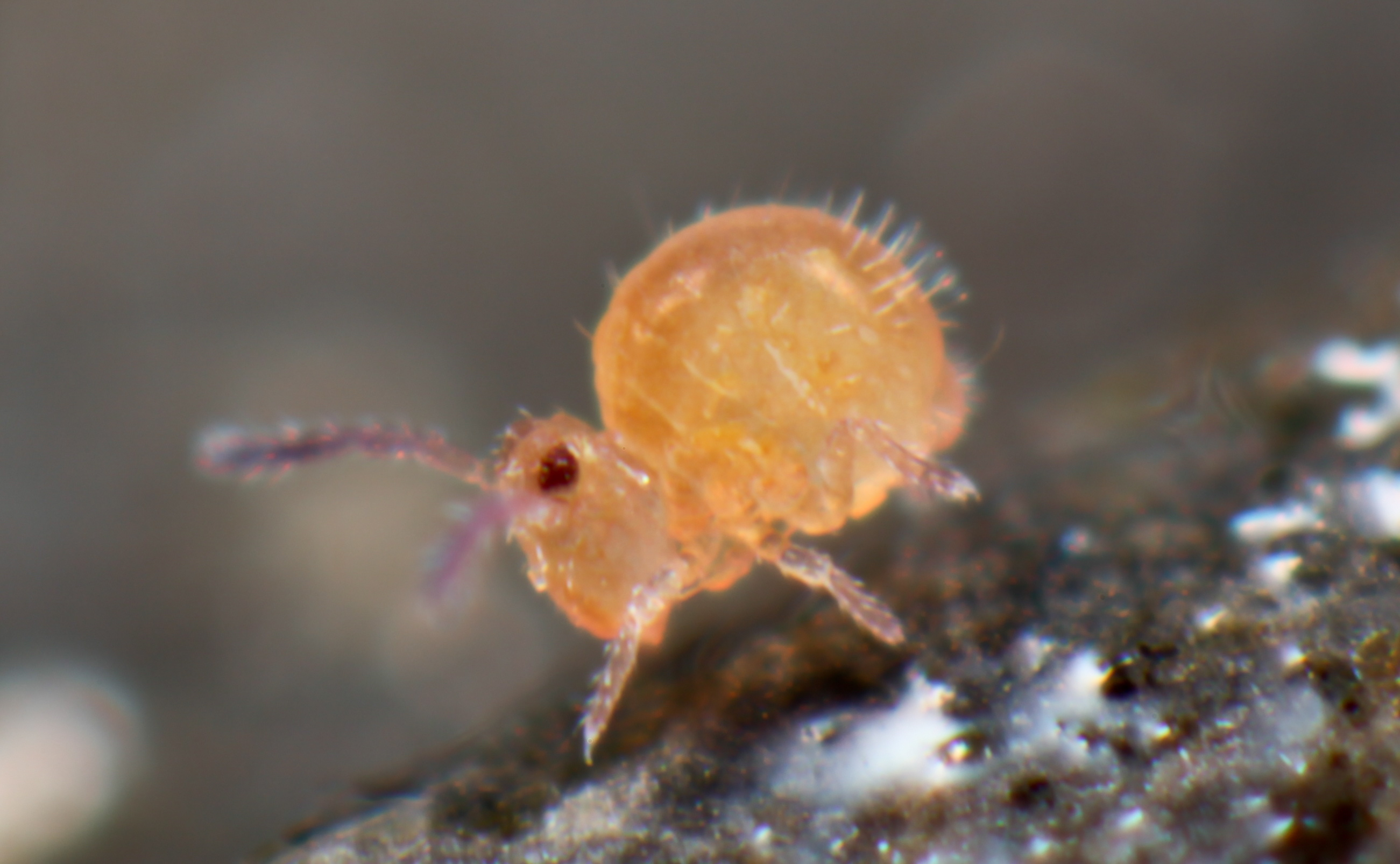
Sphaeridia pumilis

== Genera ==
These five genera belong to the family Sminthurididae:

- Boernerides Bretfeld, 1999
- Denisiella Folsom & Mills, 1938
- Sminthurides Boener, 1900
- Sphaeridia Linnaniemi, 1912
- Stenacidia Börner, 1906
