= Orchesella chiantica =

Scientific classification
- Kingdom: Animalia
- Phylum: Arthropoda
- Clade: Pancrustacea
- Class: Collembola
- Order: Entomobryomorpha
- Family: Entomobryidae
- Genus: Orchesella
- Species: O. chiantica

Binomial name
- Orchesella chiantica Frati & Szeptycki, 1990

Species of springtail

Orchesella chiantica is a species of slender springtail in the family Entomobryidae. It is a sister taxon to Orchesella villosa, and both can be found on the Italian Peninsula.
