= Sinella curviseta =

Scientific classification
- Domain: Eukaryota
- Kingdom: Animalia
- Phylum: Arthropoda
- Class: Collembola
- Order: Entomobryomorpha
- Family: Entomobryidae
- Genus: Sinella
- Species: S. curviseta

Binomial name
- Sinella curviseta Brook, 1882

Species of springtail

Sinella curviseta is a species of slender springtail in the family Entomobryidae. It is found in Europe.
