= Sinella sexoculata =

Scientific classification
- Domain: Eukaryota
- Kingdom: Animalia
- Phylum: Arthropoda
- Class: Collembola
- Order: Entomobryomorpha
- Family: Entomobryidae
- Genus: Sinella
- Species: S. sexoculata

Binomial name
- Sinella sexoculata (Schott, 1896)

Synonyms
- Entomobrya sexoculata Schott, 1896

Species of springtail

Sinella sexoculata is a species of slender springtail in the family Entomobryidae.
