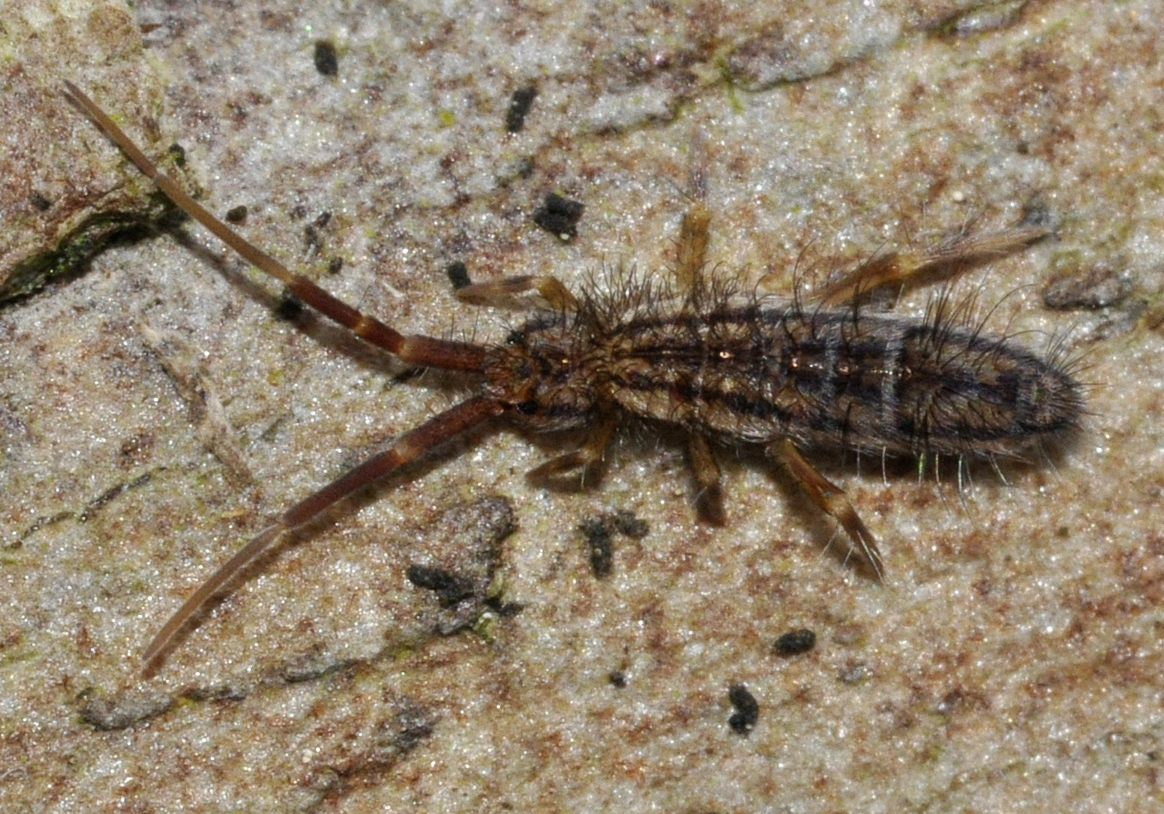
- Orchesella quinquefasciata

Scientific classification
- Kingdom: Animalia
- Phylum: Arthropoda
- Clade: Pancrustacea
- Class: Collembola
- Order: Entomobryomorpha
- Family: Entomobryidae
- Genus: Orchesella
- Species: O. quinquefasciata

Binomial name
- Orchesella quinquefasciata (Bourlet, 1842)

= Orchesella quinquefasciata =

Species of springtail

Orchesella quinquefasciata is a species of slender springtail in the family Entomobryidae. It is found in Europe.

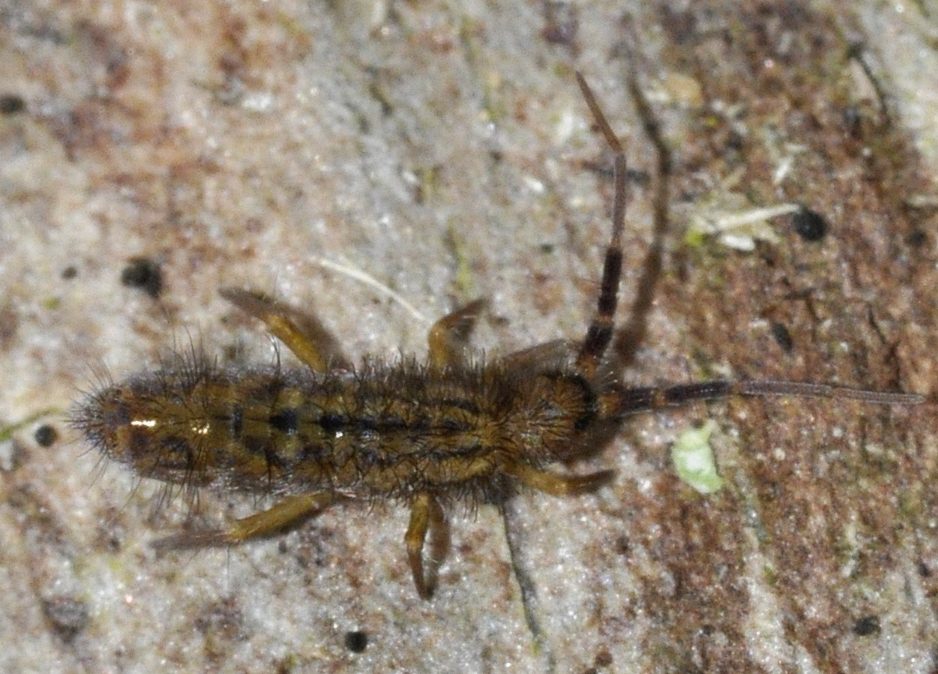
Orchesella quinquefasciata
