= Orchesella alticola =

Scientific classification
- Kingdom: Animalia
- Phylum: Arthropoda
- Clade: Pancrustacea
- Class: Collembola
- Order: Entomobryomorpha
- Family: Entomobryidae
- Genus: Orchesella
- Species: O. alticola

Binomial name
- Orchesella alticola Uzel, 1891

Species of springtail

Orchesella alticola is a species of slender springtail in the family Entomobryidae.

== Subspecies ==
These two subspecies belong to the species Orchesella alticola:

- Orchesella alticola alticola Uzel, 1891
- Orchesella alticola strigata Stach, 1960
