= Orchesella spectabilis =

Scientific classification
- Kingdom: Animalia
- Phylum: Arthropoda
- Clade: Pancrustacea
- Class: Collembola
- Order: Entomobryomorpha
- Family: Entomobryidae
- Genus: Orchesella
- Species: O. spectabilis

Binomial name
- Orchesella spectabilis Tullberg, 1871

Species of springtail

Orchesella spectabilis is a species of slender springtail in the family Entomobryidae. It is found in Europe.

Body size can be up to 40 mm. The species can be found in countries like Sweden and Finland. It typically occurs in moss and forestes.
