= Pseudosinella spinosa =

Scientific classification
- Kingdom: Animalia
- Phylum: Arthropoda
- Clade: Pancrustacea
- Class: Collembola
- Order: Entomobryomorpha
- Family: Entomobryidae
- Genus: Pseudosinella
- Species: P. spinosa

Binomial name
- Pseudosinella spinosa (Delamare, 1949)

Synonyms
- Troglosinella spinosa Delamare, 1949

Species of springtail

Pseudosinella spinosa is a species complex of slender springtails in the family Entomobryidae that reside exclusively in caves within the southeastern United States.
