= Orchesella hungarica =

Scientific classification
- Kingdom: Animalia
- Phylum: Arthropoda
- Clade: Pancrustacea
- Class: Collembola
- Order: Entomobryomorpha
- Family: Entomobryidae
- Genus: Orchesella
- Species: O. hungarica

Binomial name
- Orchesella hungarica Stach, 1929

Species of springtail

Orchesella hungarica is a species of slender springtail insects in the family Entomobryidae.
