= Orchesella frontimaculata =

Scientific classification
- Kingdom: Animalia
- Phylum: Arthropoda
- Clade: Pancrustacea
- Class: Collembola
- Order: Entomobryomorpha
- Family: Entomobryidae
- Genus: Orchesella
- Species: O. frontimaculata

Binomial name
- Orchesella frontimaculata Gisin, 1946

Species of springtail

Orchesella frontimaculata is a species of slender springtail in the family Entomobryidae.
