= Pseudosinella violenta =

Scientific classification
- Domain: Eukaryota
- Kingdom: Animalia
- Phylum: Arthropoda
- Class: Collembola
- Order: Entomobryomorpha
- Family: Entomobryidae
- Genus: Pseudosinella
- Species: P. violenta

Binomial name
- Pseudosinella violenta (Folsom, 1924)

Synonyms
- Lepidocyrtus violenta Folsom, 1924; Pseudosinella petterseni Boerner, 1901

Species of springtail

Pseudosinella violenta is a species of slender springtail in the family Entomobryidae.
