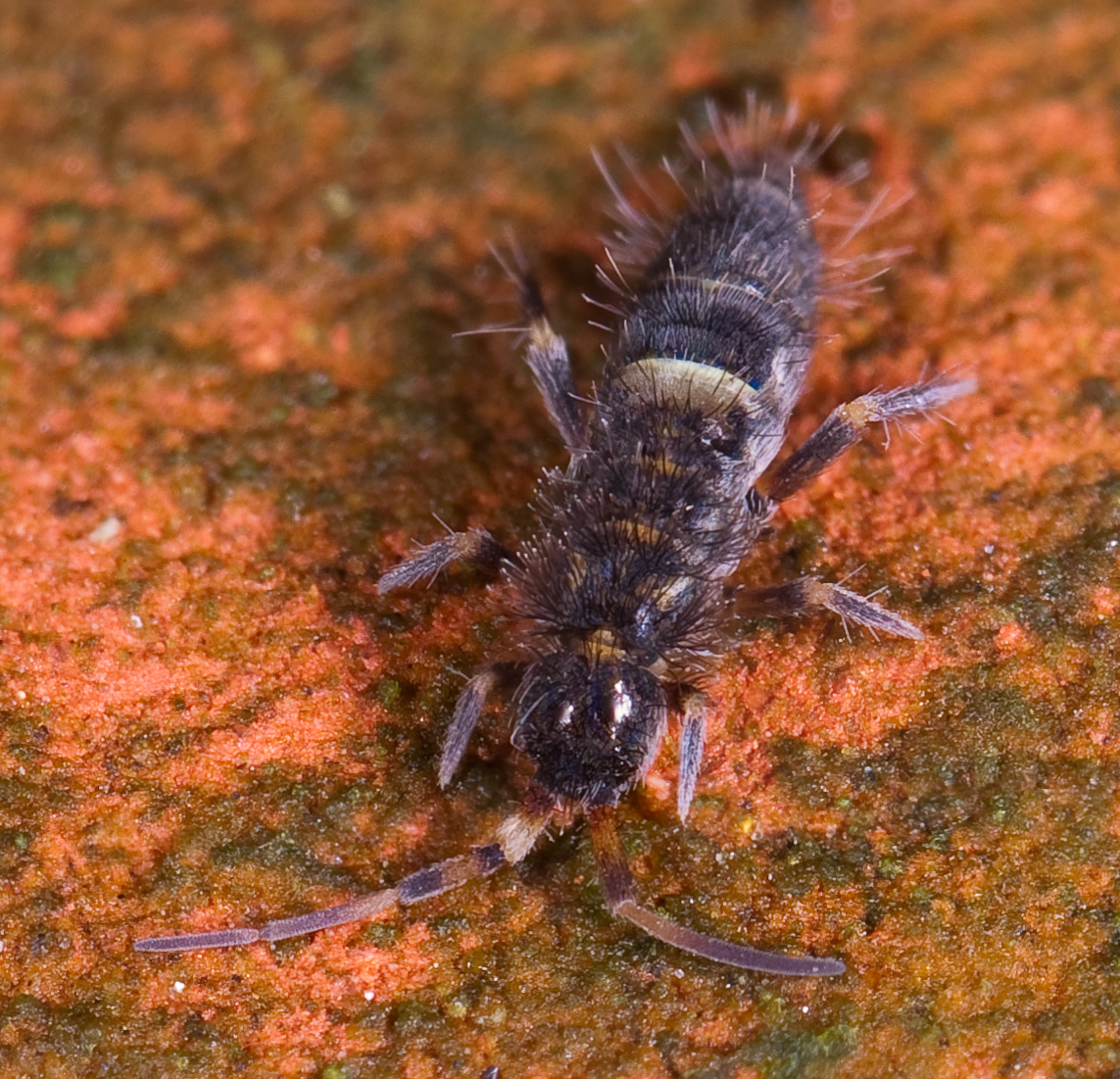
- Orchesella cincta (Entomobryidae)

Scientific classification
- Kingdom: Animalia
- Phylum: Arthropoda
- Clade: Pancrustacea
- Class: Collembola
- Order: Entomobryomorpha
- Superfamily: Entomobryoidea; Womersley, 1934, sensu Soto-Adames et al., 2008

Families
- Entomobryidae; Microfalculidae; Paronellidae; and see text

= Entomobryoidea =

Superfamily of springtails

Entomobryoidea is also the old name of Entomobryomorpha, when these were placed in the "Arthropleona"

The Entomobryoidea are a superfamily of springtails (Collembola), tiny hexapods related to insects. In the modern sense, this group is placed in an order called Entomobryomorpha.

This superfamily contains very characteristic species of springtails. They typically possess long legs and antennae, as well as a well-developed furcula.

== Systematics ==
The Entomobryoidea in the old sense – now Entomobryomorpha – were united with the Poduroidea (now Poduromorpha) in a group called "Arthropleona", but this has more recently turned out to be paraphyletic. Actually the Entomobryomorpha, the Poduromorpha, and the third springtail lineage – the Symphypleona – are equally distinct from each other. Their treatment at equal taxonomic rank reflects this.

Following a 2008 review of the Entomobryomorpha, the Cyphoderidae are demoted to a subfamily of the Paronellidae. Apart from the three living families, there are also two extinct ones known only from fossils.

- Family Paronellidae - includes Cyphoderidae
- Family Entomobryidae
- Family Microfalculidae
- Family †Oncobryidae (fossil)
- Family †Praentomobryidae (fossil)
