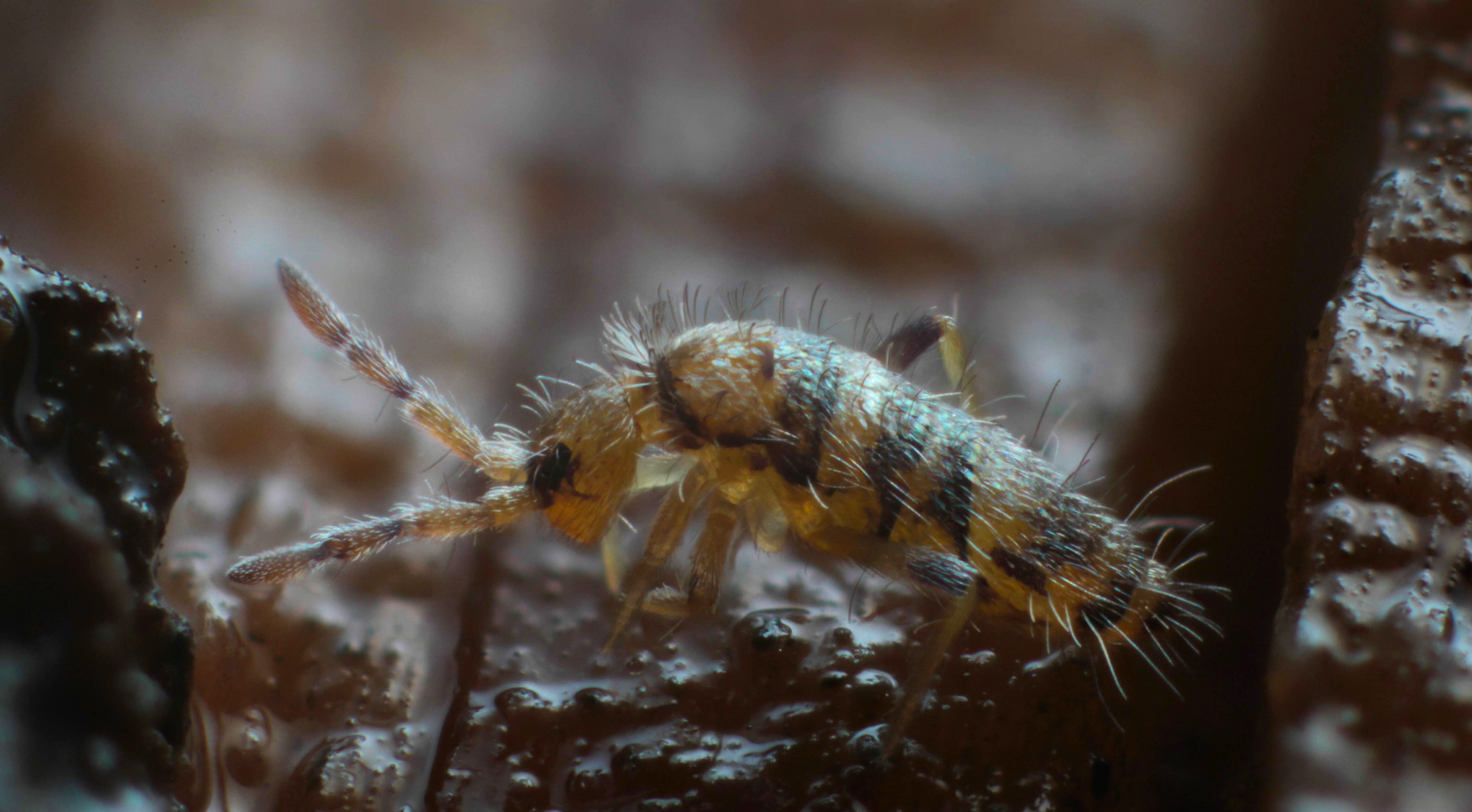

Scientific classification
- Domain: Eukaryota
- Kingdom: Animalia
- Phylum: Arthropoda
- Class: Collembola
- Order: Entomobryomorpha
- Family: Entomobryidae
- Genus: Willowsia
- Species: W. platani

Binomial name
- Willowsia platani (Nicolet, 1842)

= Willowsia platani =

Species of springtail

Willowsia platani is a species of slender springtail in the family Entomobryidae. It is found in Europe.
