= Pseudosinella alba =

Scientific classification
- Domain: Eukaryota
- Kingdom: Animalia
- Phylum: Arthropoda
- Class: Collembola
- Order: Entomobryomorpha
- Family: Entomobryidae
- Genus: Pseudosinella
- Species: P. alba

Binomial name
- Pseudosinella alba (Packard, 1873)

Synonyms
- Lepidocyrtus alba Packard, 1873

Species of springtail

Pseudosinella alba is a species of slender springtail in the family Entomobryidae. It is found in Europe.
