= O. leucocephala =

O. leucocephala may refer to:

- Orchesella leucocephala, Stach, 1923, a springtail species in the genus Orchesella
- Oxyura leucocephala, the white-headed duck, a small stiff-tailed duck species

== See also ==
- Leucocephala (disambiguation)
