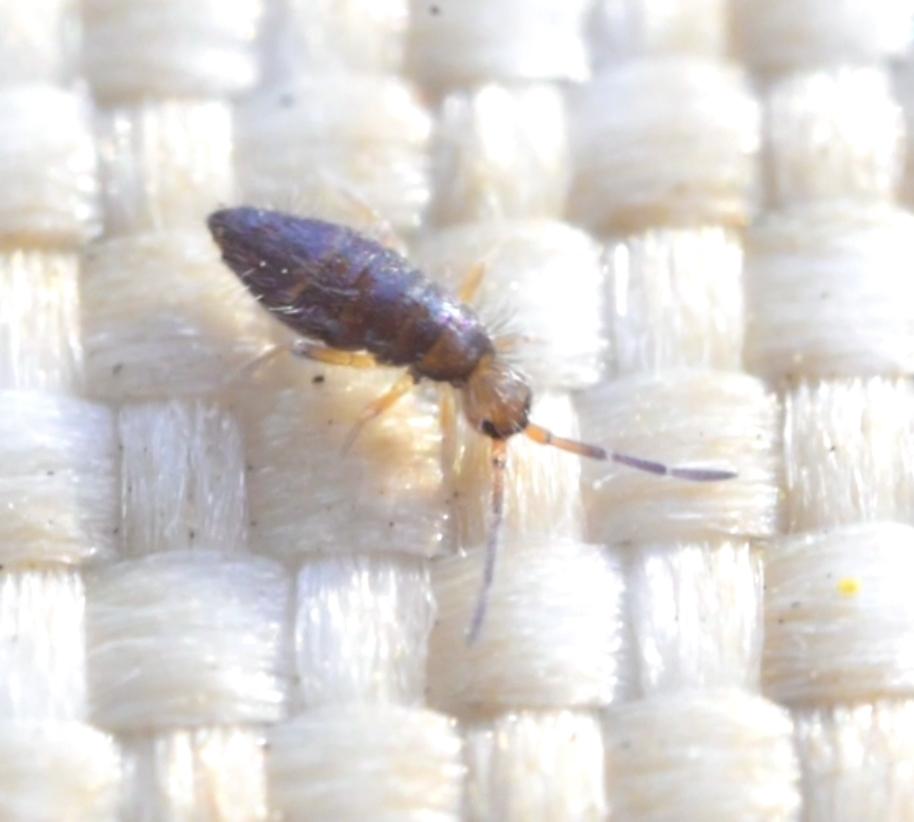

Scientific classification
- Kingdom: Animalia
- Phylum: Arthropoda
- Class: Collembola
- Order: Entomobryomorpha
- Family: Entomobryidae
- Genus: Willowsia
- Species: W. buski

Binomial name
- Willowsia buski (Lubbock, 1870)

Synonyms
- Degeeria buski distincta Maynard, 1951; Seira buski Lubbock, 1870; Willowsia pruni Nicolet, 1842

= Willowsia buski =

Species of springtail

Willowsia buski, the damp grain springtail, is a species of slender springtail in the family Entomobryidae. It is found in abundance throughout North America and Europe, and likely has a cosmopolitan distribution. It can sometimes be found infesting stores of dry goods (like grain) that have become contaminated with high moisture, giving rise to the name "damp grain springtail".

== Description ==
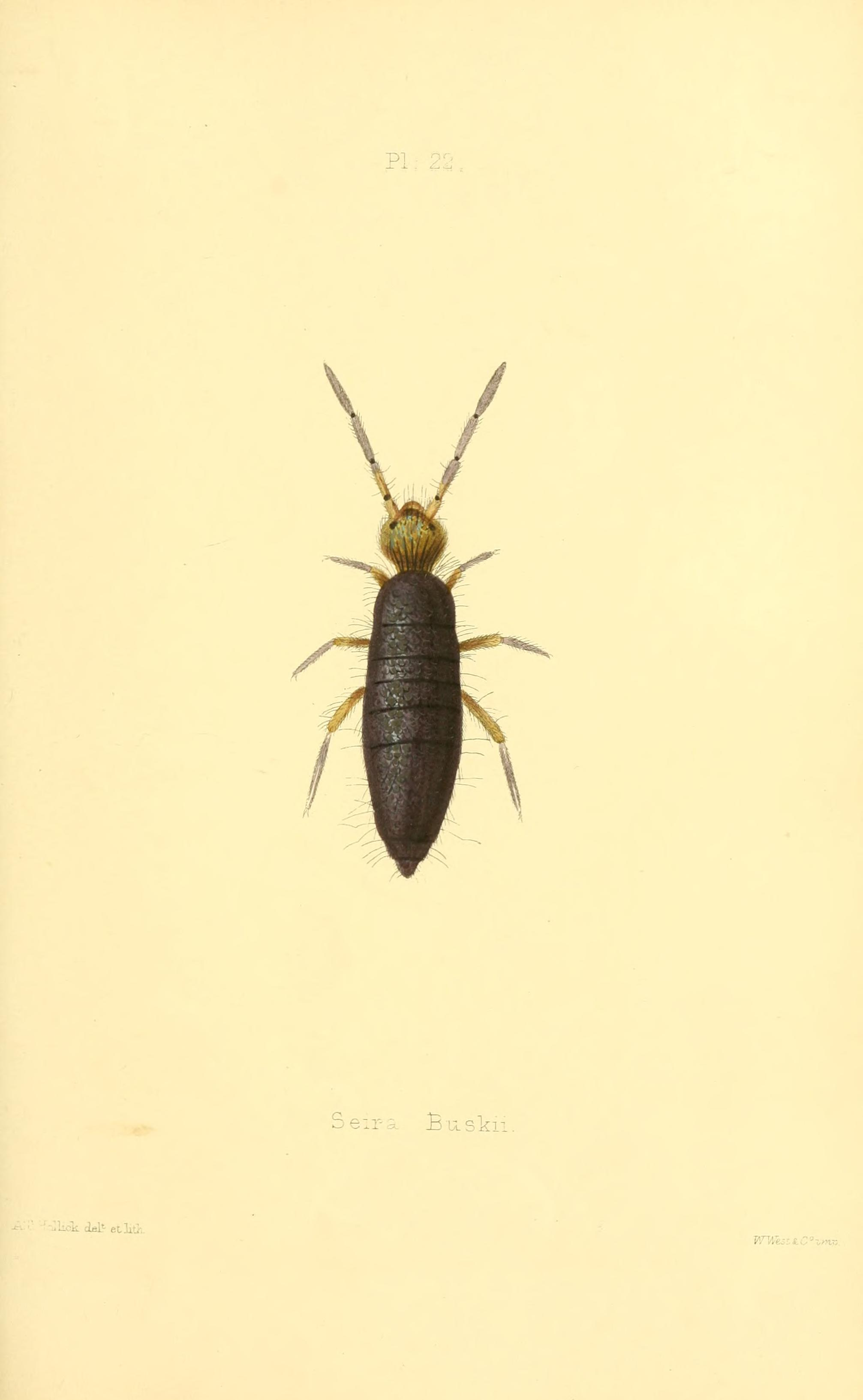
Illustration of W. buski.

Willowsia buski is a medium-sized springtail, averaging 1-2mm in length. It has a smooth, dark-purple to black appearance, with fine setae present over the body's surface. The head is generally a lighter color, allowing for easy distinction from similar species. Like all members of Entomobryidae, it has four, roughly equal antennal segments.
