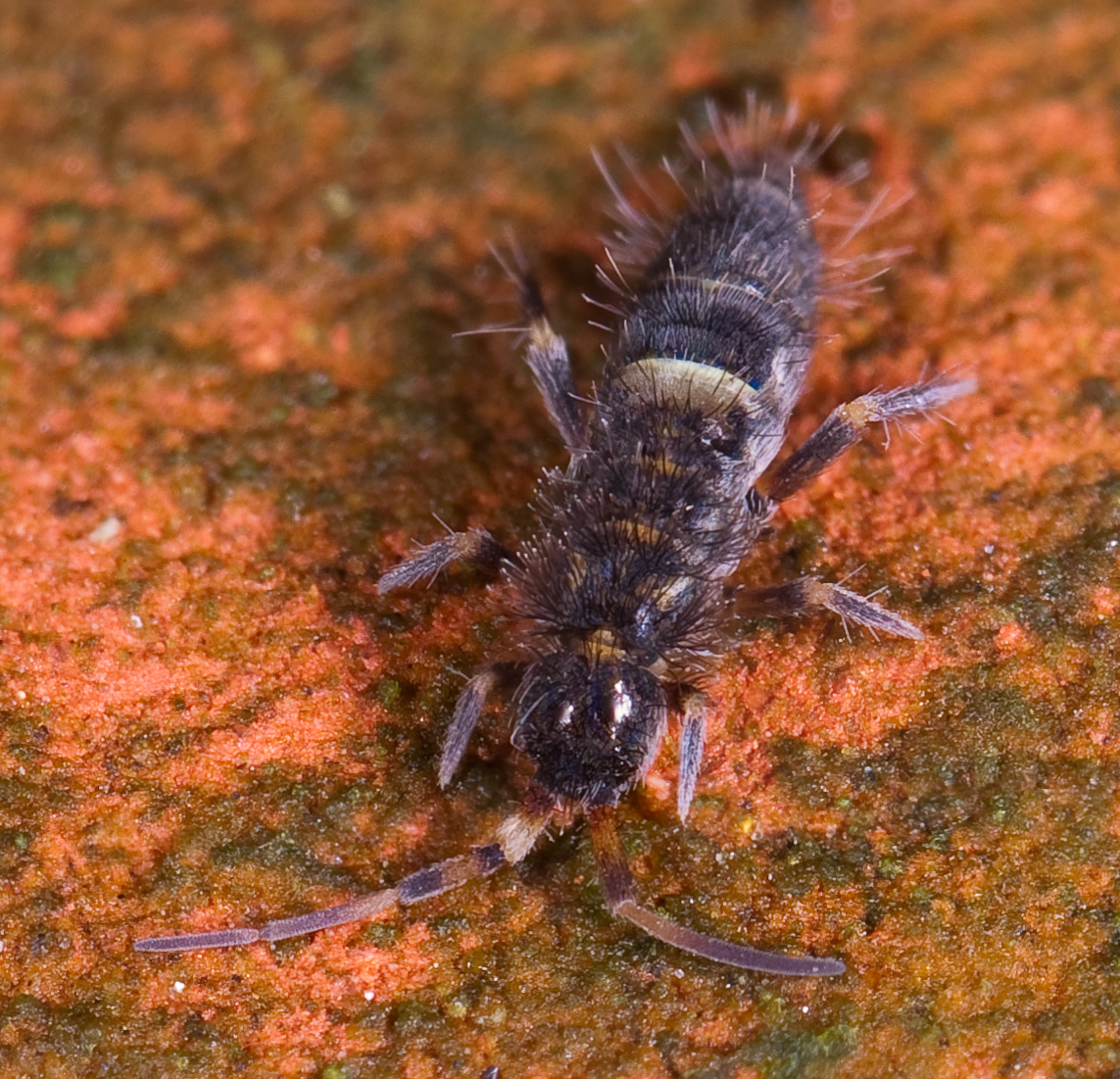

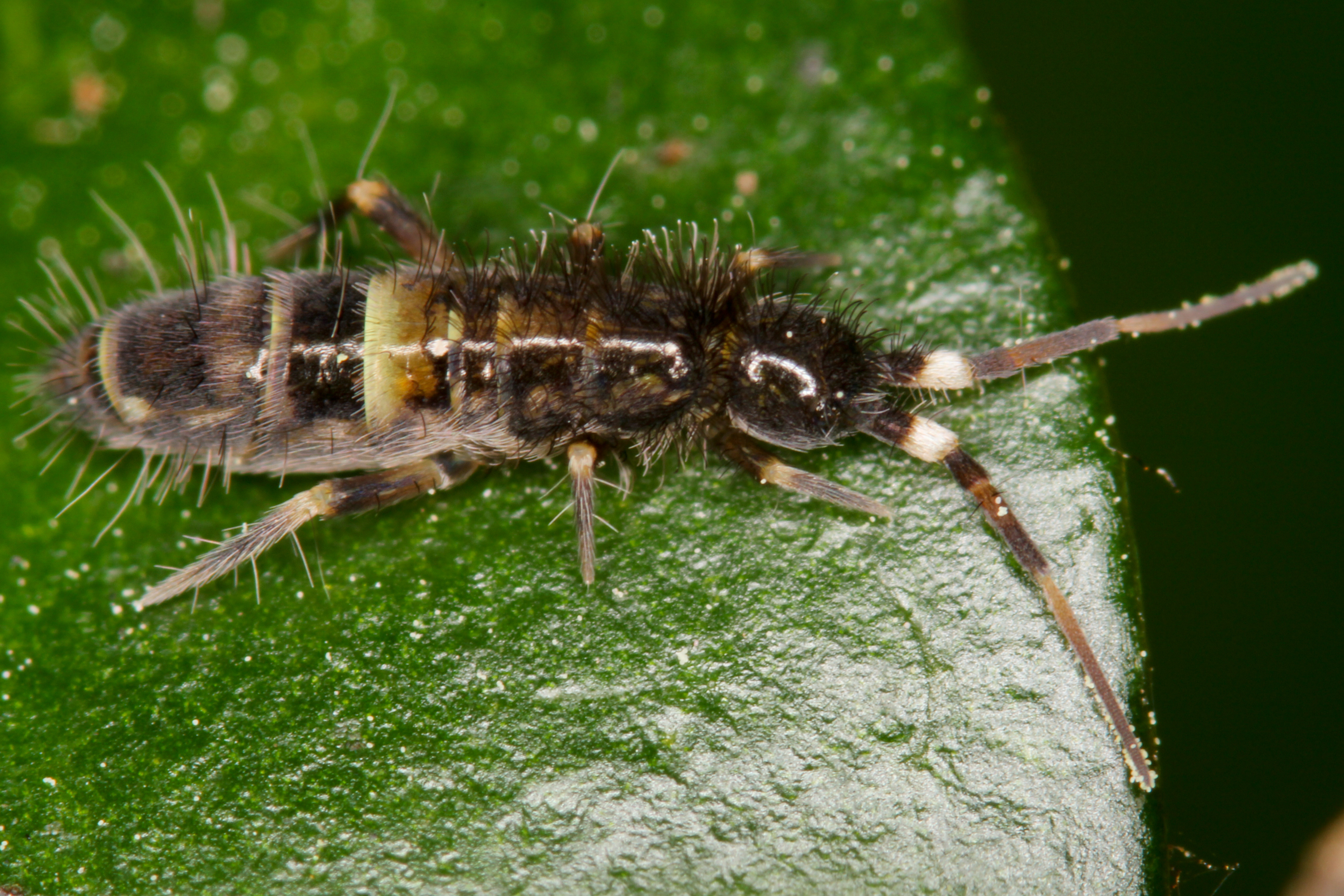

Scientific classification
- Kingdom: Animalia
- Phylum: Arthropoda
- Clade: Pancrustacea
- Class: Collembola
- Order: Entomobryomorpha
- Family: Entomobryidae
- Genus: Orchesella
- Species: O. cincta

Binomial name
- Orchesella cincta (Linnaeus, 1758)

= Orchesella cincta =

Species of springtail

Orchesella cincta is a species of springtail that belongs to the family Entomobryidae (slender springtails). They are present in North America and Europe. They average 4 millimetres (0.16 in) in length, which is extremely large as most springtails don’t grow past 1 millimetre.

The specific name cincta means "belted" and refers to the distinctive colouration of the third abdominal segment.

== Description ==
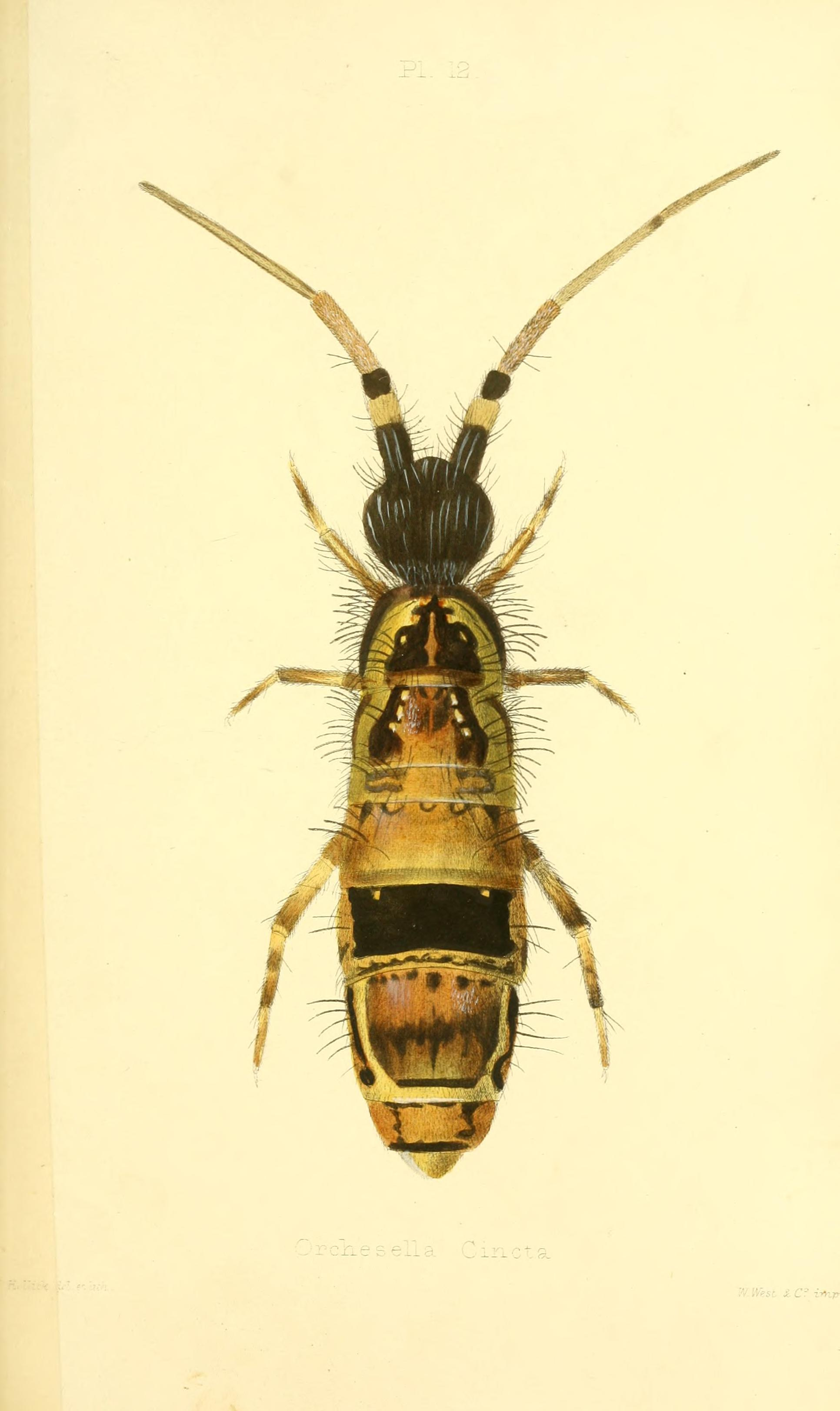
Illustration of O. cincta.

Springtails are small, wingless relatives of insects and typically have six abdominal segments, a tubular appendage projecting ventrally from the first abdominal segment, and a forked, tail-like appendage, the furcula, folded under the last abdominal segment, with which the animal can flip itself into the air.

Members of the genus Orchesella have six antennal segments. Orchesella cincta reaches about 4 mm (0.16 in) in length and has a distinctively pigmented third abdominal segment and a dark third antennal segment. In contrast, the posterior part of the second abdominal segment and the distal part of the second antennal segments are white. The fifth and sixth antennal segments are brown, but otherwise the colouring of antennae and abdomen are variable, ranging from reddish-brown through various shades of brown to blackish. The body is thickly clad with hairs. There is a tendency for the antennae to be of unequal length, perhaps because of damage to the antennae during the developmental stages.

== Distribution ==
Orchesella cincta is found in Western Europe and Canada. It is known from Norway, Sweden, Switzerland, France, the Netherlands and the British Isles. It is one of the most common species in the British Isles where it is known from multiple locations in Scotland, England, Wales and Ireland. It is also common on Saint Helena in the mid-Atlantic, having presumably been introduced accidentally with plant material.

This species lives in soil and among leaf litter in woodland. In the laboratory it can be maintained on twigs covered with green algae.

== Ecology ==
Orchesella cincta can act both as an herbivore feeding on live and dead plant tissue, mosses, algae and lichens and a fungivore/bacterivore.

Springtails moult throughout their life and in this species, feeding and reproductive instars alternate. When circumstances are adverse (dry conditions, low temperatures), the reproductive phases can be postponed until conditions improve, at which time the start of reproductive activity is synchronised across the population; this is a successful strategy, the population surge allowing this species to make the most of the available resources.

Orchesella cincta has a high metabolic rate and a high fertility rate and is more mobile than many species; it is more likely to spread into new habitats such as the foliage of plants and crevices in trees.
