= Pseudosinella rolfsi =

Scientific classification
- Domain: Eukaryota
- Kingdom: Animalia
- Phylum: Arthropoda
- Class: Collembola
- Order: Entomobryomorpha
- Family: Entomobryidae
- Genus: Pseudosinella
- Species: P. rolfsi

Binomial name
- Pseudosinella rolfsi Mills, 1932

Species of springtail

Pseudosinella rolfsi is a species of slender springtail in the family Entomobryidae.
