= Orchesella nigrescens =

Scientific classification
- Kingdom: Animalia
- Phylum: Arthropoda
- Clade: Pancrustacea
- Class: Collembola
- Order: Entomobryomorpha
- Family: Entomobryidae
- Genus: Orchesella
- Species: O. nigrescens

Binomial name
- Orchesella nigrescens Latzel, 1917

Species of springtail

Orchesella nigrescens is a species of slender springtail in the family Entomobryidae.
