= Sinella =

Scientific classification
- Domain: Eukaryota
- Kingdom: Animalia
- Phylum: Arthropoda
- Class: Collembola
- Order: Entomobryomorpha
- Family: Entomobryidae
- Subfamily: Entomobryinae
- Genus: Sinella; Brook, 1882

Synonyms
- Parasinella Bonet, 1934

Genus of springtails

Sinella is a genus of slender springtails in the family Entomobryidae. There are at least 20 described species in Sinella.

== Species ==
- Sinella aera Christiansen & Bellinger, 1992
- Sinella agna Christiansen and Bellinger, 1992
- Sinella alata Christiansen, 1960
- Sinella avita Christiansen, 1960
- Sinella baca Christiansen & Bellinger, 1992
- Sinella barri Christiansen & Bellinger, 1992
- Sinella basidens Bonet, 1934
- Sinella binoculata (Schott, 1896)
- Sinella borerae Christiansen & Bellinger, 1992
- Sinella caeca (Schott, 1896)
- Sinella cavernarum (Packard, 1888)
- Sinella curviseta Brook, 1882
- Sinella hoefti Schaeffer, 1896
- Sinella hoffmani Wray, 1952
- Sinella krekeleri Christiansen, 1960
- Sinella kukae Christiansen & Bellinger, 1992
- Sinella lua Christiansen & Bellinger, 1992
- Sinella nupa Christiansen & Bellinger, 1992
- Sinella quadrioculata Mills, 1935
- Sinella sexoculata (Schott, 1896)
- Sinella tecta Christiansen & Bellinger, 1992
- Sinella yosiia Bellinger & Christiansen, 1992
