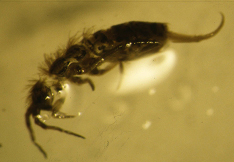
- Surface-living springtail (Collembola) of the family Entomobryidae, size: ca. 5 mm

Scientific classification
- Kingdom: Animalia
- Phylum: Arthropoda
- Clade: Pancrustacea
- Class: Collembola
- Order: Entomobryomorpha
- Family: Entomobryidae
- Genus: Orchesella
- Species: O. villosa

Binomial name
- Orchesella villosa (Linnaeus, 1767)

Synonyms
- Orchesella villosa diagonalis Marnard, 1951

= Orchesella villosa =

Species of springtail

Orchesella villosa is a species of slender springtail in the family Entomobryidae. It is found in Europe, and is an invasive species in North America.

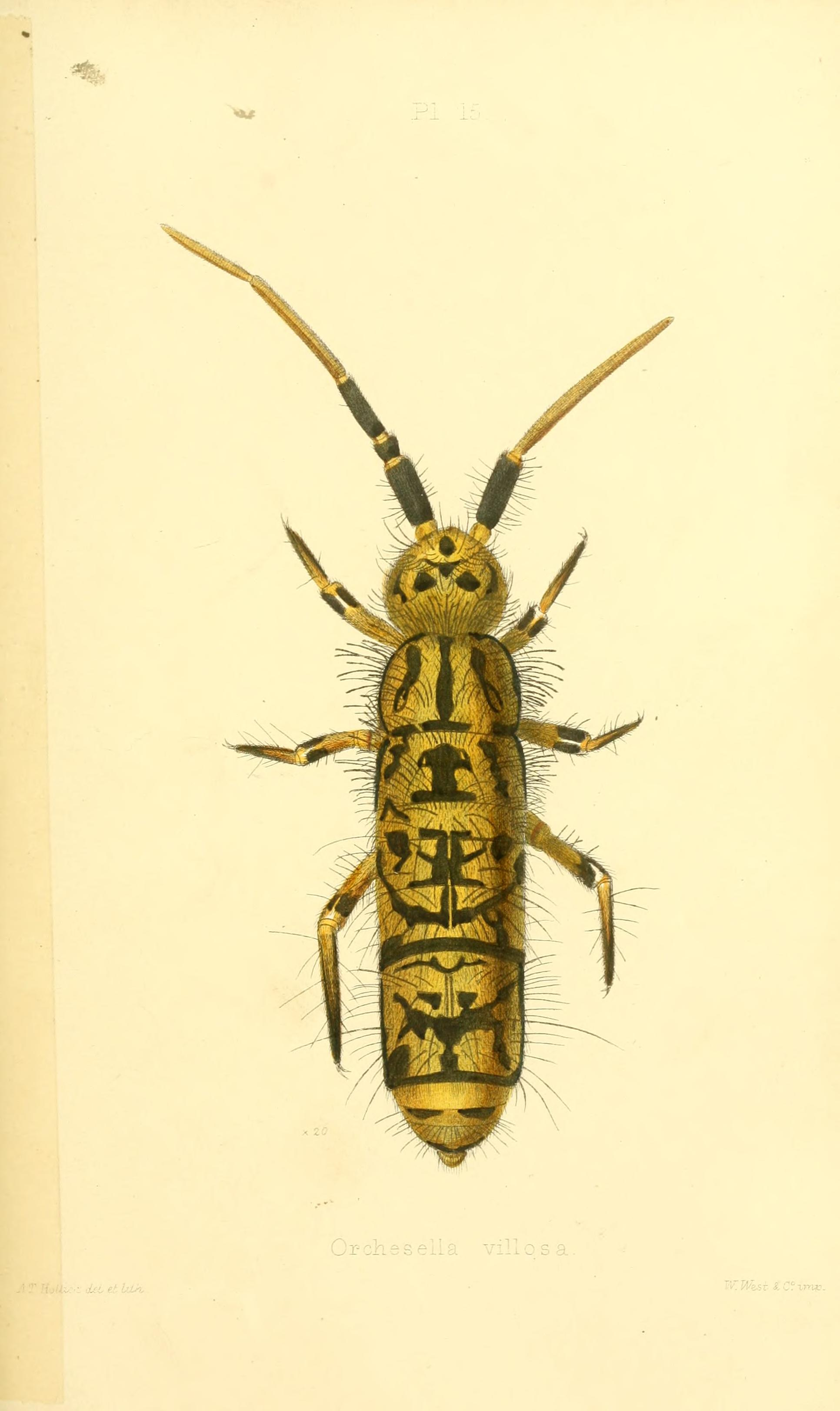
Illustration of O. villosa.
