= O. flavescens =

O. flavescens may refer to:

- Obolcola flavescens, a geometer moth
- Oligoryzomys flavescens, a southern South American rodent
- Ommatius flavescens, a robber fly
- Onchidella flavescens, a sea slug
- Opistophthalmus flavescens, a burrowing scorpion
- Orchesella flavescens, a slender springtail
- Oria flavescens, an owlet moth
- Orthosia flavescens, an owlet moth
- Otaria flavescens, a sea lion
- Ozarba flavescens, an owlet moth
