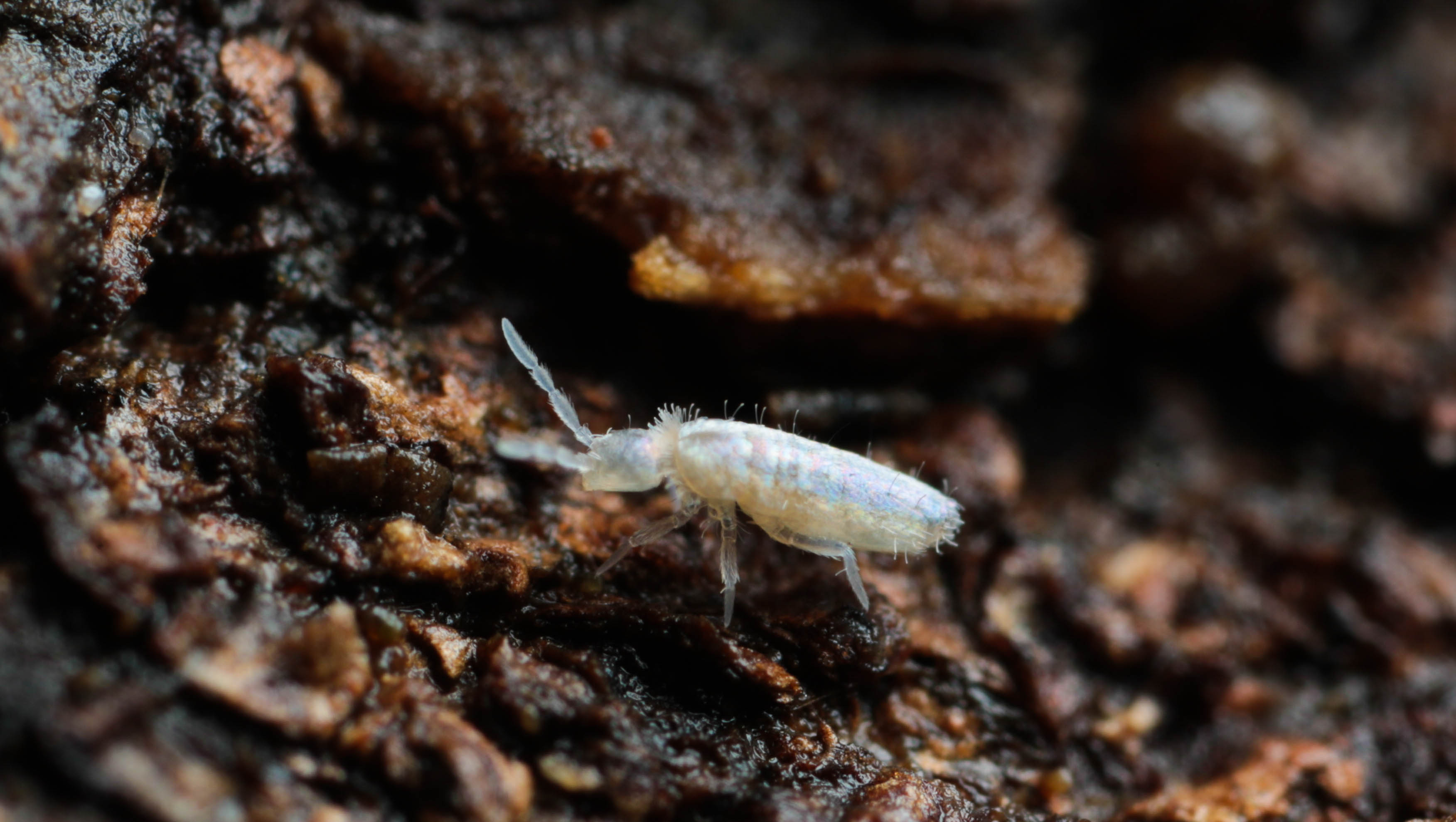
- Pseudosinella immaculata

Scientific classification
- Kingdom: Animalia
- Phylum: Arthropoda
- Clade: Pancrustacea
- Class: Collembola
- Order: Entomobryomorpha
- Family: Entomobryidae
- Subfamily: Lepidocyrtinae
- Genus: Pseudosinella; Schaeffer, 1897

Synonyms
- Troglosinella Delamare, 1949

= Pseudosinella =

Genus of springtails

Pseudosinella is a genus of slender springtails in the family Entomobryidae. There are more than 20 described species in Pseudosinella. They are extremely hard to identify and are found in Subterranean environments. most species require microscopic analysis to identify.

== Habitat ==
most species of Pseudosinella live under rocks or in caves. There are some exceptions to this rule, usually with long antenna.

== Species ==
- Pseudosinella aera Christiansen and Bellinger, 1980
- Pseudosinella alba (Packard, 1873)
- Pseudosinella argentea Folsom, 1902
- Pseudosinella cavernarum Moniez, 1893
- Pseudosinella certa Christiansen and Bellinger, 1980
- Pseudosinella christianseni Salmon, 1964
- Pseudosinella collina Wray, 1952
- Pseudosinella dubia Christiansen, 1961
- Pseudosinella espana Christiansen, 1961
- Pseudosinella folsomi (Mills, 1931)
- Pseudosinella fujiokai Christiansen and Luther, 1986
- Pseudosinella gisini Christiansen, 1961
- Pseudosinella hirsuta (Delmare, 1949)
- Pseudosinella immaculata (Lie-pettersen, 1897)
- Pseudosinella kalalauensis Christiansen and Luther, 1986
- Pseudosinella lahainaensis Borner, 1901
- Pseudosinella nata Christiansen and Bellinger, 1980
- Pseudosinella octopunctata Boerner, 1901
- Pseudosinella orba Christiansen, 1961
- Pseudosinella pecki Christiansen and Bellinger, 1980
- Pseudosinella rolfsi Mills, 1932
- Pseudosinella sera Christiansen and Bellinger, 1980
- Pseudosinella sexoculata Schott, 1902
- Pseudosinella spinosa (Delamare, 1949)
- Pseudosinella testa Christiansen and Bellinger, 1980
- Pseudosinella violenta (Folsom, 1924)
- Pseudosinella vita Christiansen and Bellinger, 1980
