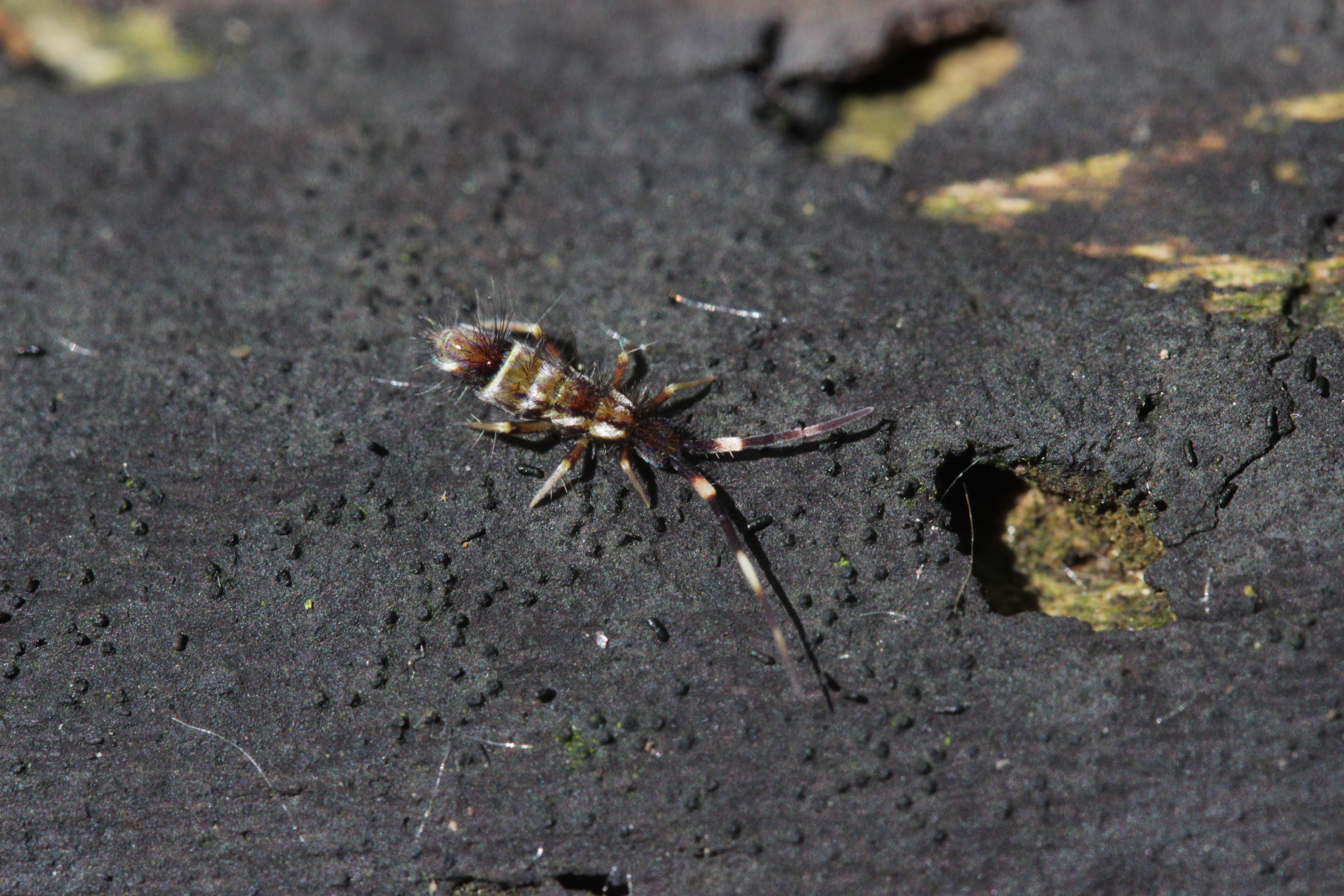
- Orchesella flavescens
- Orchesella flavcescens on fungus

Scientific classification
- Kingdom: Animalia
- Phylum: Arthropoda
- Clade: Pancrustacea
- Class: Collembola
- Order: Entomobryomorpha
- Family: Entomobryidae
- Genus: Orchesella
- Species: O. flavescens

Binomial name
- Orchesella flavescens (Bourlet, 1839)

= Orchesella flavescens =

Species of springtail

Orchesella flavescens is a species of slender springtail in the family Entomobryidae. It is found in Europe. It is found predominantly in late spring and beginning of summer.

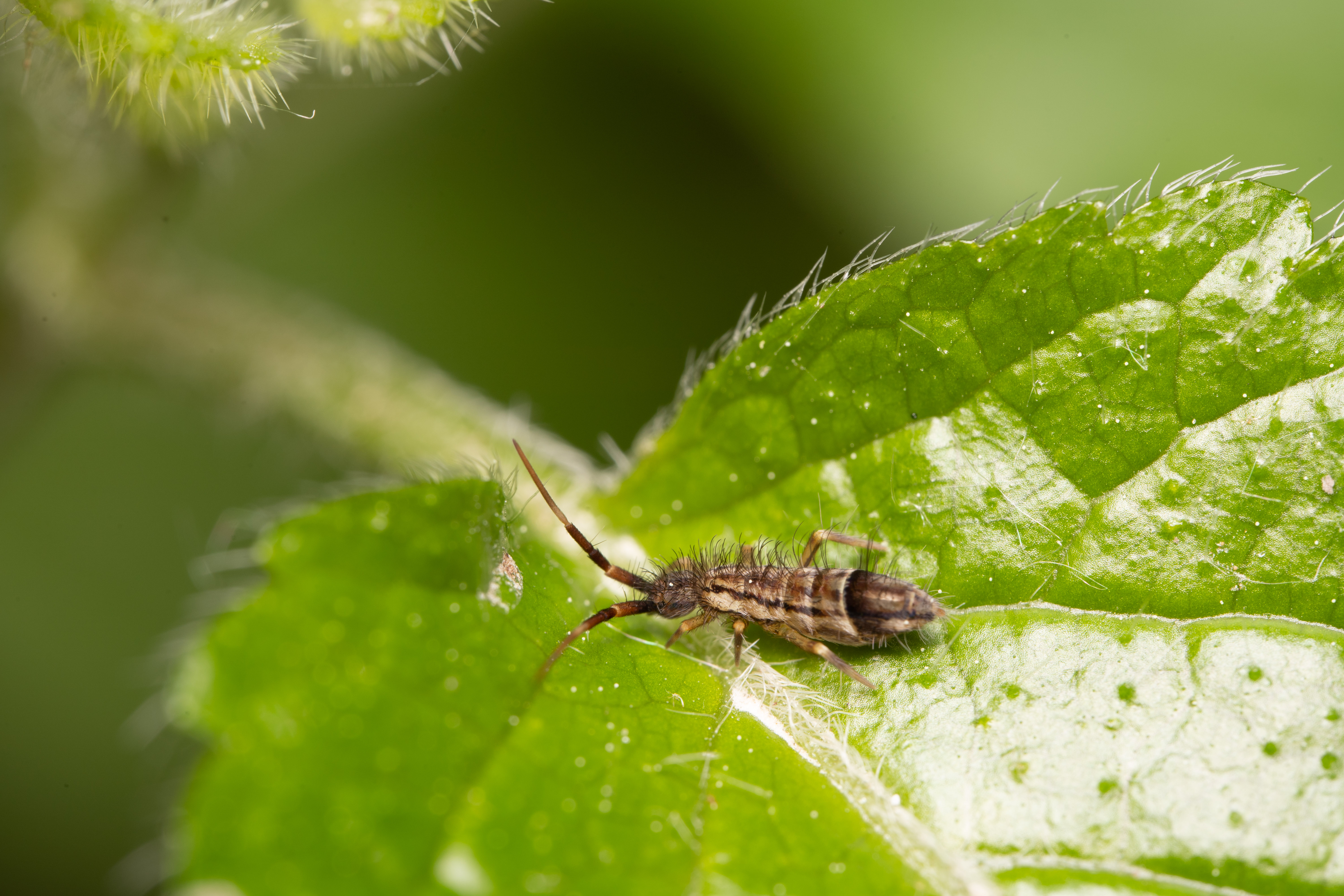
Orchesella flavescens

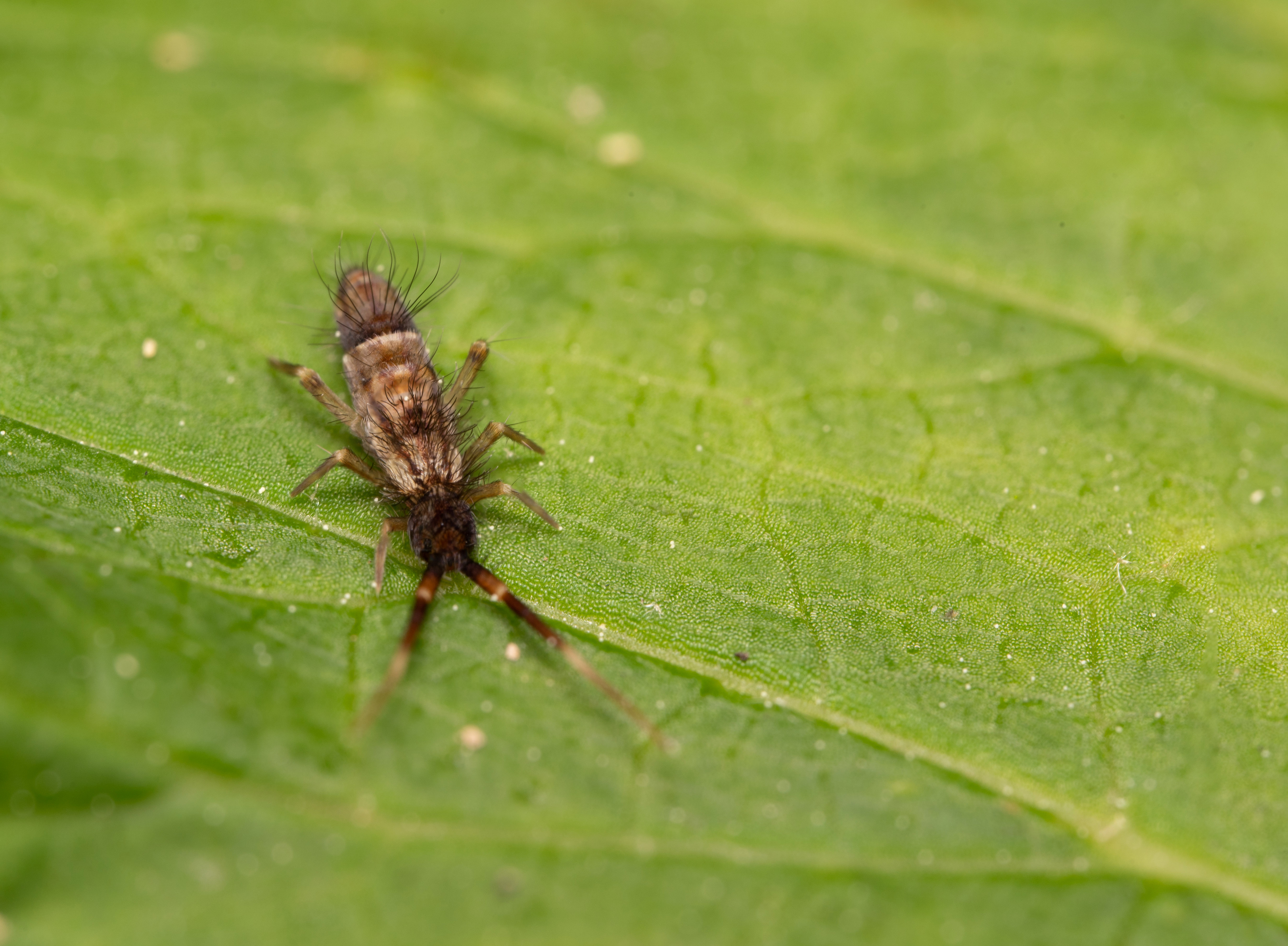
Orchesella flavescens

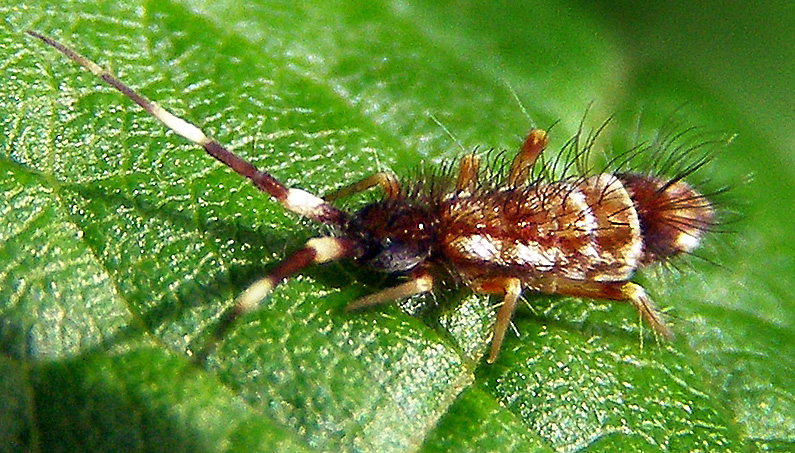
Orchesella flavescens
