= Orchesellides =

Scientific classification
- Domain: Eukaryota
- Kingdom: Animalia
- Phylum: Arthropoda
- Class: Collembola
- Order: Entomobryomorpha
- Family: Entomobryidae
- Subfamily: Orchesellinae
- Genus: Orchesellides; Bonet, 1930

Genus of springtails

Orchesellides is a genus of slender springtails in the family Entomobryidae. There is at least one described species in Orchesellides, O. sinensis.
