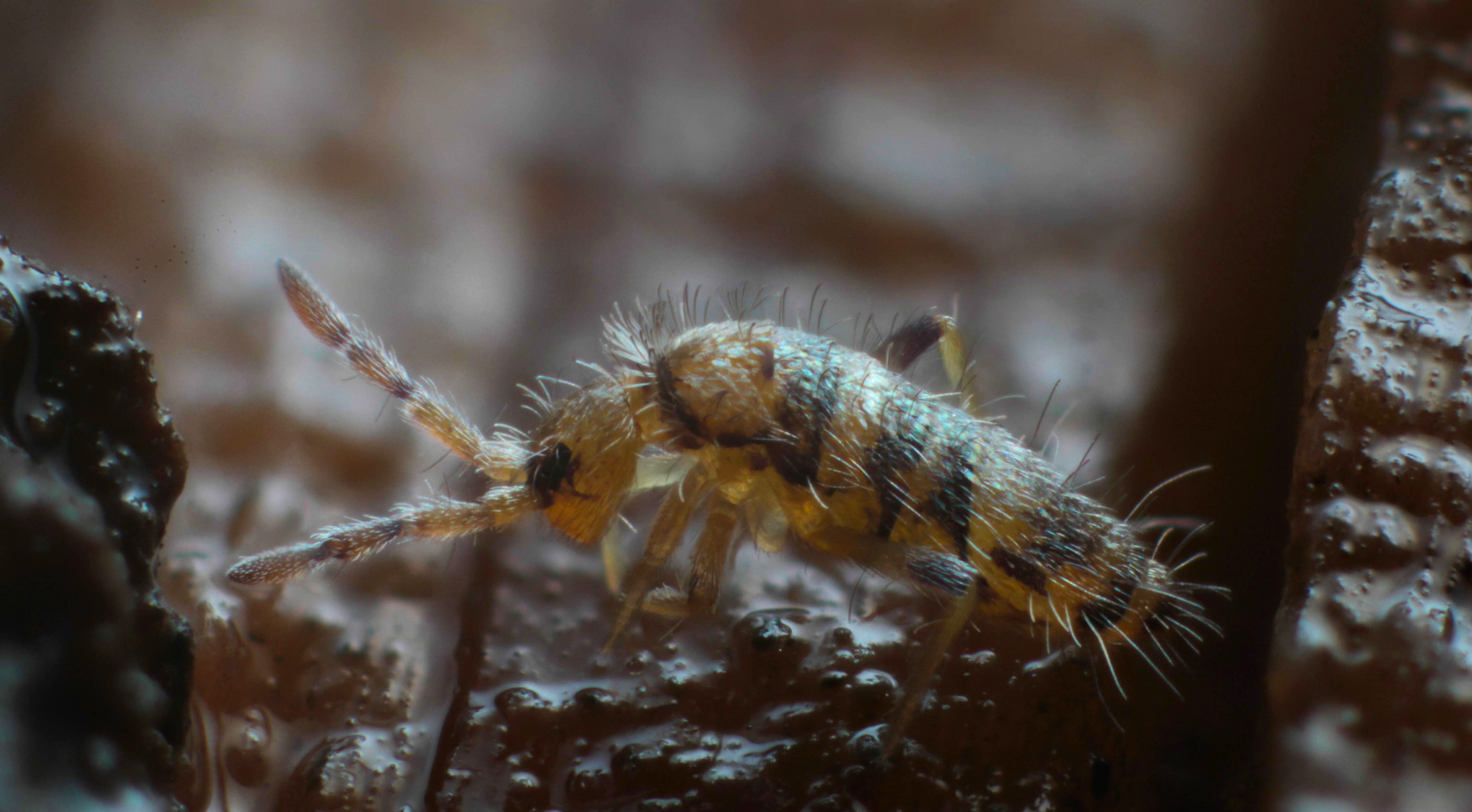
- Willowsia platani

Scientific classification
- Domain: Eukaryota
- Kingdom: Animalia
- Phylum: Arthropoda
- Class: Collembola
- Order: Entomobryomorpha
- Family: Entomobryidae
- Genus: Willowsia; Shoebotham, 1917

= Willowsia =

Genus of springtails

Willowsia is a genus of slender springtails in the family Entomobryidae. There are about six described species in Willowsia.

== Species ==
- Willowsia buski (Lubbock, 1870) (damp grain springtail)
- Willowsia jacobsoni (Borner, 1913)
- Willowsia kahlertae Christiansen & Bellinger, 1992
- Willowsia mekila Christiansen & Bellinger, 1992
- Willowsia nigromaculata (Lubbock, 1873)
- Willowsia platani (Nicolet, 1842)
