= Hawinella =

Scientific classification
- Domain: Eukaryota
- Kingdom: Animalia
- Phylum: Arthropoda
- Class: Collembola
- Order: Entomobryomorpha
- Family: Entomobryidae
- Subfamily: Lepidocyrtinae
- Genus: Hawinella; Bellinger & Christiansen, 1974

Genus of springtails

Hawinella is a genus of slender springtails in the family Entomobryidae. There are at least two described species in Hawinella.

== Species ==
These two species belong to the genus Hawinella:

- Hawinella kuaola Christiansen & Bellinger, 1992^{i c g}
- Hawinella lava Bellinger & Christiansen, 1974^{i c g}

Data sources: i = ITIS, c = Catalogue of Life, g = GBIF, b = Bugguide.net
