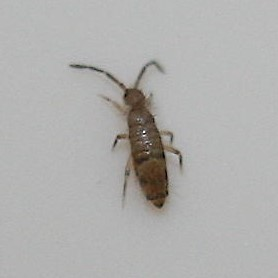
- Found in a bathtub in Michigan

Scientific classification
- Domain: Eukaryota
- Kingdom: Animalia
- Phylum: Arthropoda
- Class: Collembola
- Order: Entomobryomorpha
- Family: Entomobryidae
- Genus: Willowsia
- Species: W. nigromaculata

Binomial name
- Willowsia nigromaculata (Lubbock, 1873)

Synonyms
- Seira nigromaculata Lubbock, 1873; Willowsia mimica Harvey, 1894

= Willowsia nigromaculata =

Species of springtail

Willowsia nigromaculata is a member of the family Entomobryidae. It has a metallic iridescent body and is covered in translucent scales. It is often found indoors in places such as houses, garages and greenhouses.
