= Dicranocentrus =

Scientific classification
- Domain: Eukaryota
- Kingdom: Animalia
- Phylum: Arthropoda
- Class: Collembola
- Order: Entomobryomorpha
- Family: Entomobryidae
- Genus: Dicranocentrus; Schött, 1893

Genus of springtails

Dicranocentrus is a genus of slender springtails in the family Entomobryidae. There are about six described species in Dicranocentrus.

== Species ==
These six species belong to the genus Dicranocentrus:

- Dicranocentrus amazonicus^{g}
- Dicranocentrus cuprum^{g}
- Dicranocentrus halophilus Mari Mutt, 1985^{g}
- Dicranocentrus indicus Bonet, 1930^{g}
- Dicranocentrus melinus^{g}
- Dicranocentrus wangi^{g}

Data sources: i = ITIS, c = Catalogue of Life, g = GBIF, b = Bugguide.net
