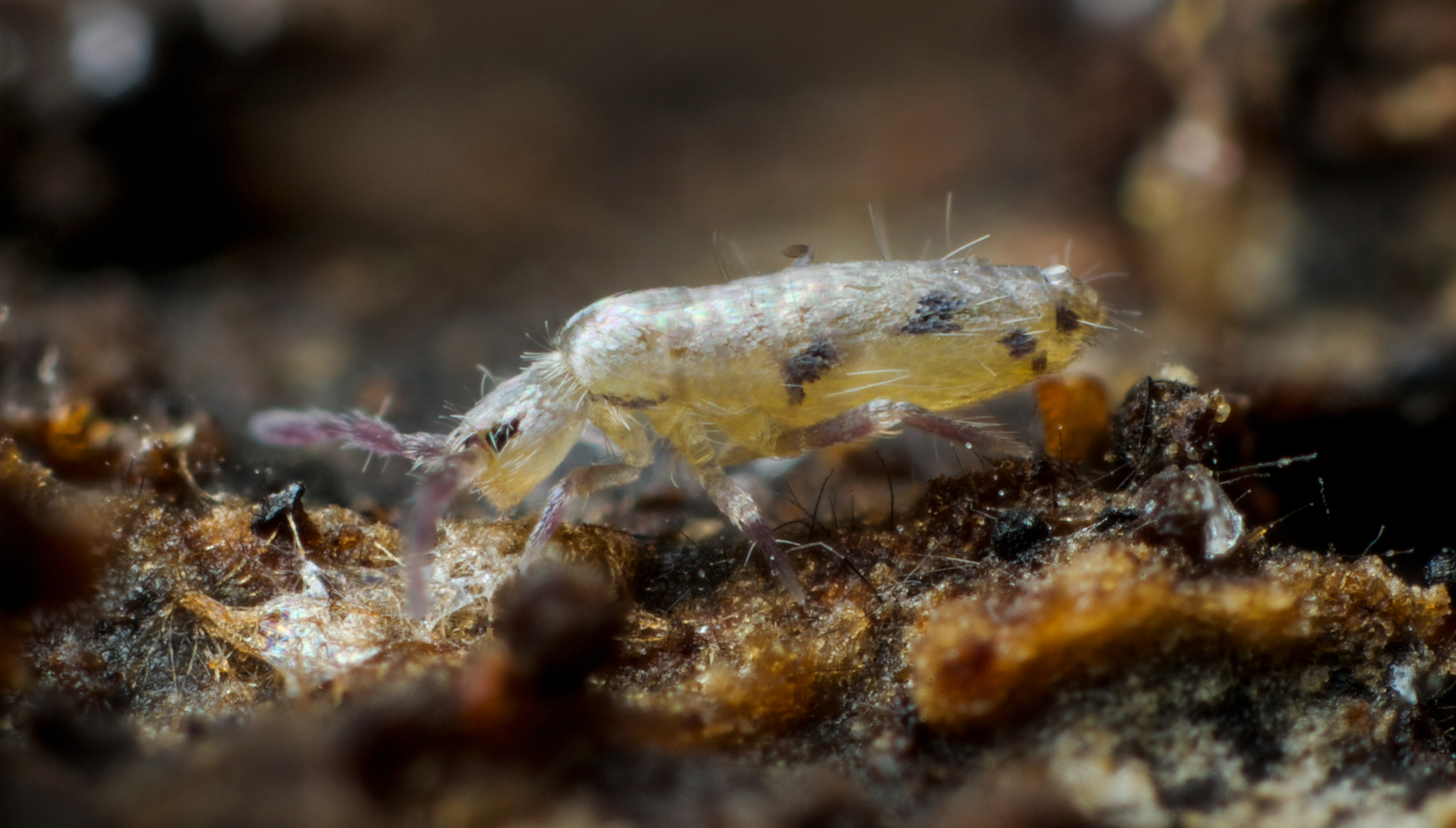
- Lepidosira sexmacula

Scientific classification
- Domain: Eukaryota
- Kingdom: Animalia
- Phylum: Arthropoda
- Class: Collembola
- Order: Entomobryomorpha
- Family: Entomobryidae
- Genus: Lepidosira

= Lepidosira =

Genus of springtails

Lepidosira is a genus of slender springtails in the family Entomobryidae. There are several described species in Lepidosira.

== Species ==
The following species belong to the genus Lepidosira:

- Lepidosira alba (Nguyen, 2005)^{c g}
- Lepidosira angulata (Schött, 1917)^{c g}
- Lepidosira anomala Salmon, 1944^{c g}
- Lepidosira arborea Salmon, 1944^{c g}
- Lepidosira australica (Schött, 1917)^{c g}
- Lepidosira bidentata Salmon, 1938^{c g}
- Lepidosira bifasciata (Salmon, 1944)^{c g}
- Lepidosira bisecta (Salmon, 1944)^{c g}
- Lepidosira brunnea (Womersley, 1935)^{c g}
- Lepidosira calolepis (Börner, 1913)^{c g}
- Lepidosira congoia Salmon, 1956^{c g}
- Lepidosira dorsalis (Salmon, 1941)^{c g}
- Lepidosira faaroana (Carpenter, 1934)^{c g}
- Lepidosira fallaciosa Yoshii, 1989^{c g}
- Lepidosira flava (Salmon, 1938)^{c g}
- Lepidosira fuchsiata (Salmon, 1938)^{c g}
- Lepidosira fuscata Womersley, 1930^{c g}
- Lepidosira gigantea (Börner, 1909)^{c g}
- Lepidosira glebosa Salmon, 1941^{c g}
- Lepidosira gupta Howard, 1969^{c g}
- Lepidosira ianthina (Salmon, 1941)^{c g}
- Lepidosira inconstans (Salmon, 1938)^{c g}
- Lepidosira indistincta Slmon, 1938^{c g}
- Lepidosira javana (Börner, 1913)^{c g}
- Lepidosira laboriosa Greenslade, 1994^{c g}
- Lepidosira lichenata (Salmon, 1938)^{c g}
- Lepidosira longicornis (Schött, 1917)^{c g}
- Lepidosira magna (Salmon, 1937)^{c g}
- Lepidosira minima Salmon, 1938^{c g}
- Lepidosira minuta Salmon, 1938^{c g}
- Lepidosira neotropicalis Nunes & Bellini, 2019^{c g}
- Lepidosira nigrocephala (Womersley, 1934)^{g}
- Lepidosira nigropunctata (Nguyen, 2005)^{g}
- Lepidosira nilgiri (Denis, 1936)^{g}
- Lepidosira obscura (Salmon, 1944)^{c g}
- Lepidosira okarita Salmon, 1938^{c g}
- Lepidosira omniofusca Salmon, 1941^{c g}
- Lepidosira pallida (Ritter, 1911)^{c g}
- Lepidosira parva (Salmon, 1941)^{c g}
- Lepidosira pigmenta Salmon, 1944^{c g}
- Lepidosira punctata Yosii, 1960^{c g}
- Lepidosira purpurea Salmon, 1944^{c g}
- Lepidosira quadradentata (Salmon, 1941)^{c g}
- Lepidosira reducta (Salmon, 1938)^{c g}
- Lepidosira rotorua Salmon, 1938^{c g}
- Lepidosira sagmaria (Schött, 1917)^{c g}
- Lepidosira sexmacula Salmon, 1938^{c g}
- Lepidosira splendida (Salmon, 1941)^{c g}
- Lepidosira sundana Yoshii & Suhardjono, 1989^{c g}
- Lepidosira terraereginae Ellis & Bellinger, 1973^{c g}
- Lepidosira unguserrata Salmon, 1970^{c g}
- Lepidosira variabilis (Oudemans, 1890)^{c g}
- Lepidosira variabilis (Schäffer, 1897)^{c g} [note: unresolved junior homonym]
- Lepidosira vicina Yoshii, 1989^{c g}
- Lepidosira violacea (Salmon, 1938)^{c g}
- Lepidosira violaceapallipes (Denis, 1931)^{c g}
- Lepidosira womersleyi Greenslade, 1994^{c g}

Data sources: c = Catalogue of Life, g = GBIF, i = ITIS, b = Bugguide.net
