= Tomolonus =

Scientific classification
- Kingdom: Animalia
- Phylum: Arthropoda
- Class: Collembola
- Order: Entomobryomorpha
- Family: Tomoceridae
- Genus: Tomolonus; H.B.Mills, 1949
- Species: T. reductus

Binomial name
- Tomolonus reductus H.B.Mills, 1949

Genus of springtails

Tomolonus is a monotypic genus of springtail in the family Tomoceridae, containing only the species Tomolonus reductus. It is similar to the other members of Tomoceridae, but is distinguished by having only 3 ocelli on its eyepatch. The genus was first described by the American entomologist Harlow B. Mills in 1949.
