= Janetschekbrya =

Scientific classification
- Kingdom: Animalia
- Phylum: Arthropoda
- Class: Collembola
- Order: Entomobryomorpha
- Family: Entomobryidae
- Subfamily: Entomobryinae
- Genus: Janetschekbrya; Yosii, 1971

Genus of springtails

Janetschekbrya is a genus of slender springtails in the family Entomobryidae. There are at least two described species in Janetschekbrya.

== Species ==
These two species belong to the genus Janetschekbrya:

- Janetschekbrya arida Christiansen and Bellinger, 1980^{i c g}
- Janetschekbrya himalica Yosii, 1971^{i c g}

Data sources: i = ITIS, c = Catalogue of Life, g = GBIF, b = Bugguide.net
