= Entomobryoides =

Scientific classification
- Kingdom: Animalia
- Phylum: Arthropoda
- Clade: Pancrustacea
- Class: Collembola
- Order: Entomobryomorpha
- Family: Entomobryidae
- Genus: Entomobryoides; Maynard, 1951

Genus of springtails

Entomobryoides is a genus of arthropods in the family Entomobryidae.

== Species ==
The following species are recognised in the genus Entomobryoides:

- Entomobryoides dagestanicus
- Entomobryoides dissimilis
- Entomobryoides gruati
- Entomobryoides guthriei
- Entomobryoides kalakaua
- Entomobryoides kea
- Entomobryoides malena
- Entomobryoides mauna
- Entomobryoides mineola
- Entomobryoides puakea
- Entomobryoides purpurascens
- Entomobryoides sotoadamesi
- BOLD:ACD0365
- BOLD:ACD0449
- BOLD:ACJ6648
- BOLD:ACJ7403
- BOLD:ADJ4677
