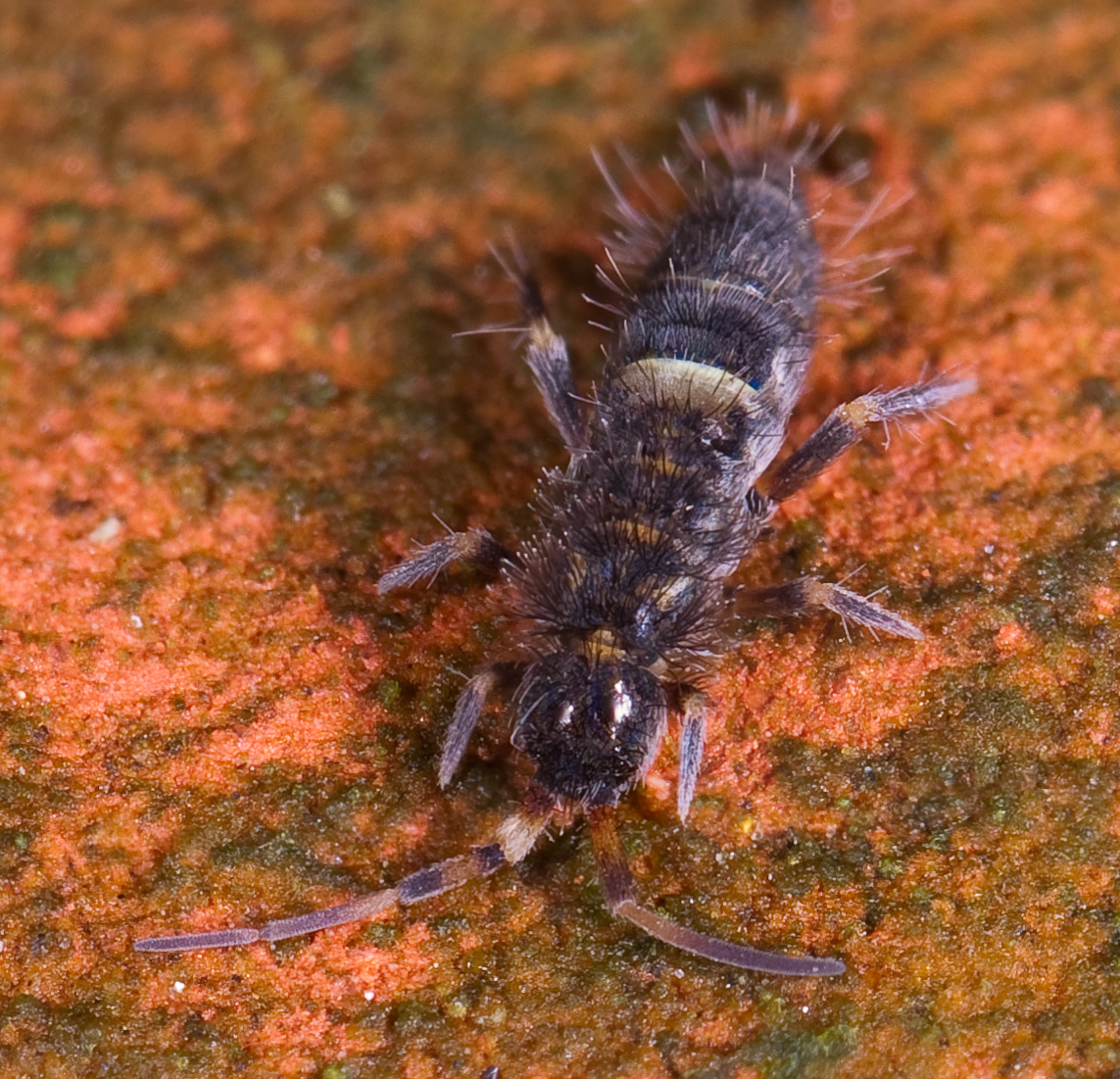
- Orchesella cincta

Scientific classification
- Kingdom: Animalia
- Phylum: Arthropoda
- Clade: Pancrustacea
- Class: Collembola
- Order: Entomobryomorpha
- Family: Entomobryidae
- Genus: Orchesella; R. Templeton, 1836

= Orchesella =

Genus of springtails

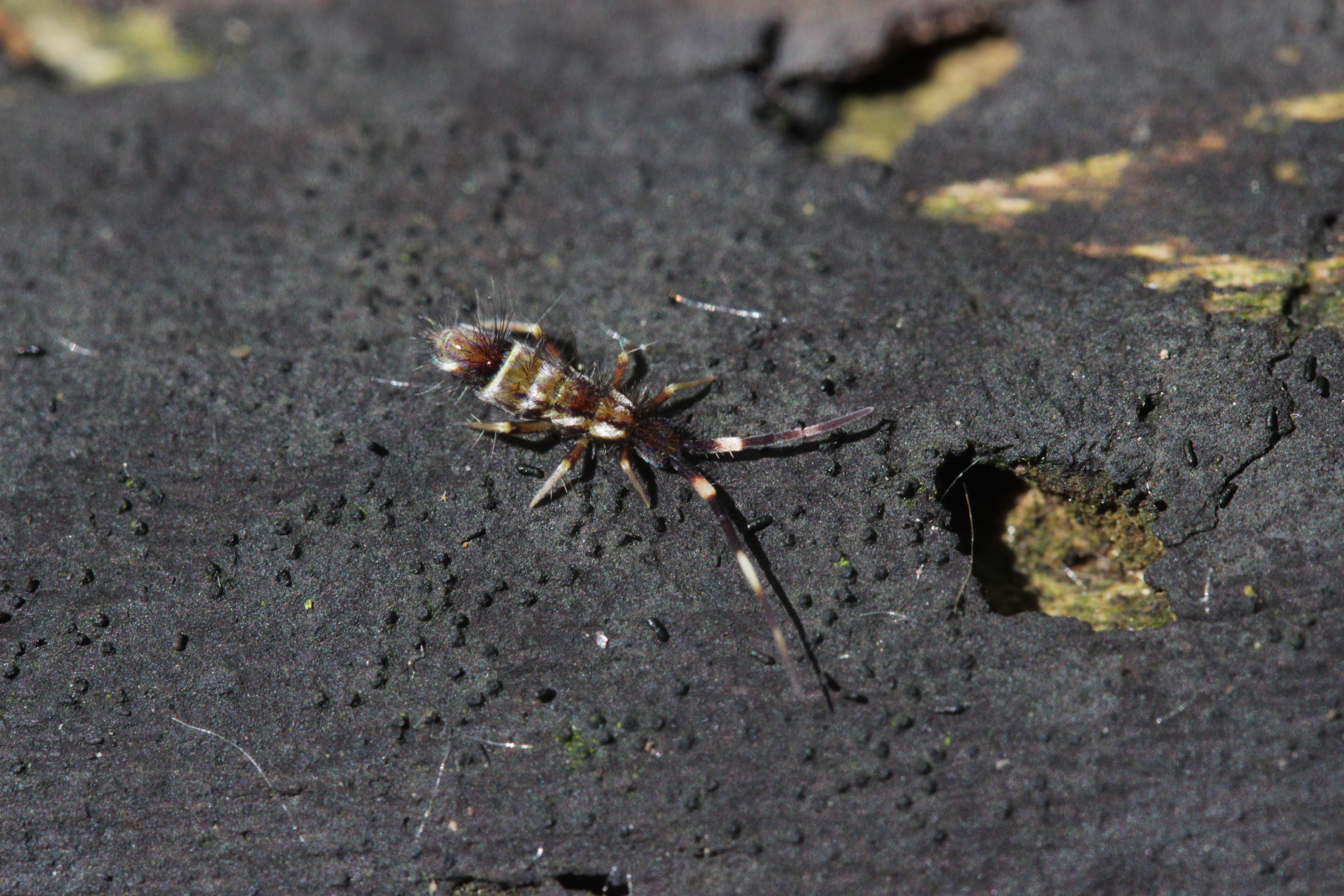
Orchesella flavescens

Orchesella is a genus of springtails belonging to the family Entomobryidae. This genus includes springtails with subdivided basal antennal segments.

== Species ==
These 96 species belong to the genus Orchesella:

- Orchesella adriatica Stach, 1960
- Orchesella ainsliei Folsom, JW, 1924
- Orchesella ainslieri Folsom, 1924
- Orchesella albofasciata J.Stach, 1960
- Orchesella albosa J.E.Guthrie, 1903
- Orchesella alpa Christiansen & Tucker, 1977
- Orchesella alticola Uzel, 1891
- Orchesella angustistrigata J.Stach, 1960
- Orchesella annulicornis H.B.Mills, 1934
- Orchesella arcuata W.Lindenmann, 1950
- Orchesella ariegica P.Cassagnau, 1964
- Orchesella balcanica J.Stach, 1960
- Orchesella bifasciata H.Nicolet, 1842
- Orchesella bulba Christiansen & Tucker, 1977
- Orchesella bulgarica J.Stach, 1960
- Orchesella bullulata J.A.Mari Mutt, 1984
- Orchesella capillata Kos & F, 1936
- Orchesella capreana Denis, 1931
- Orchesella carneiceps A.S.Packard, 1873
- Orchesella carpatica Ionesco, 1915
- Orchesella caucasica Stach, 1960
- Orchesella celsa Christiansen & Tucker, 1977
- Orchesella chiantica Frati & Szeptycki, 1990
- Orchesella chilensis H.Nicolet, 1847
- Orchesella cincta (Linnaeus, 1758) (hairy-back girdled springtail)
- Orchesella colluvialis Jordana R & Baquero E, 2017
- Orchesella croatica J.Stach, 1960
- Orchesella dallaii Frati & Szeptycki, 1990
- Orchesella delhezi Stomp, 1983
- Orchesella devergens Handschin, 1924
- Orchesella disjuncta Stach, 1960
- Orchesella distincta Carl, 1900
- Orchesella diversicincta Kos & F, 1936
- Orchesella eolia H.Altner, 1961
- Orchesella erpeldingae Stomp, 1968
- Orchesella fishmani K.A.Christiansen & B.E.Tucker, 1977
- Orchesella flavescens (Bourlet, 1839)
- Orchesella flora Christiansen & Tucker, 1977
- Orchesella flosomi Maynard, 1933
- Orchesella folsomi Maynard, 1933
- Orchesella frontimaculata Gisin, 1946
- Orchesella gloriosa Snider, 1997
- Orchesella hexfasciata Harvey, 1951
- Orchesella hoffmanni N.Stomp, 1968
- Orchesella hungarica J.Stach, 1930
- Orchesella imitari Snider, 1997
- Orchesella impavida J.A.Mari Mutt, 1984
- Orchesella intermedia Skorikov, 1899
- Orchesella irregularilineata J.Stach, 1960
- Orchesella jonescoi Denis, 1926
- Orchesella jurassica W.Lindenmann, 1950
- Orchesella kervillei Denis & J-R, 1932
- Orchesella leucocephala Stach, 1923
- Orchesella lineata J.M.Brown, 1926
- Orchesella litoralis Brown, 1925
- Orchesella longifasciata J.Stach, 1960
- Orchesella lucasi Denis, 1925
- Orchesella luteola H.Lucas, 1846
- Orchesella maculosa Ionesco, 1915
- Orchesella maledicta Denis & J-R, 1931
- Orchesella manitobae J.A.Mari Mutt, 1985
- Orchesella mauritanica Lin., 1846
- Orchesella melitensis J.Stach, 1960
- Orchesella mesovoides Baquero E & Jordana R, 2017
- Orchesella montana Stach, 1937
- Orchesella multifasciata Stscherbakow, 1898
- Orchesella nigrescens R.Latzel, 1917
- Orchesella oredonensis P.Cassagnau, 1964
- Orchesella orientalis J.Stach, 1960
- Orchesella palestinensis J.Stach, 1960
- Orchesella pallens (E.A.Maynard, 1951)
- Orchesella pannonica Stach, 1960
- Orchesella pontica Ionesco, 1915
- Orchesella prisojnikiana Kos, 1936
- Orchesella pseudobifasciata J.Stach, 1960
- Orchesella pulchra Stscherbakow, 1898
- Orchesella quadriguttata J.Stach, 1960
- Orchesella quinaria J.A.Mari Mutt, 1984
- Orchesella quinquefasciata (Bourlet, 1842)
- Orchesella ranzii Parisi, 1960
- Orchesella rectangulata J.Stach, 1960
- Orchesella semitaeniata R.Latzel, 1917
- Orchesella simplex P.Cassagnau, 1964
- Orchesella spectabilis Tullberg, 1871
- Orchesella sphagneticola Stach, 1960
- Orchesella sporadica Ellis, 1974
- Orchesella stebaevae M.B.Potapov & A.Kremenitsa, 2008
- Orchesella taurica (Stach, 1960)
- Orchesella texensis Snider, 1997
- Orchesella triglavensis Kos & F, 1936
- Orchesella uzeli Skorikov, 1899
- Orchesella villosa (Linnaeus, 1767)
- Orchesella viridilutea J.Stach, 1960
- Orchesella zaninae Nosek, 1964
- Orchesella zebra Guthrie, 1903
- † Orchesella eocaena Handschin, 1926
