= Oncobryidae =

Scientific classification
- Domain: Eukaryota
- Kingdom: Animalia
- Phylum: Arthropoda
- Class: Collembola
- Order: Entomobryomorpha
- Superfamily: Entomobryoidea
- Family: †Oncobryidae

Family of springtails

Oncobryidae is a family of extinct springtails in the order Collembola. There is at least one genus, †Oncobrya, and one species, †Oncobrya decepta, in Oncobryidae. It has been found in Alberta, Canada
