= Furcula (springtail) =

Anatomical structure in springtails

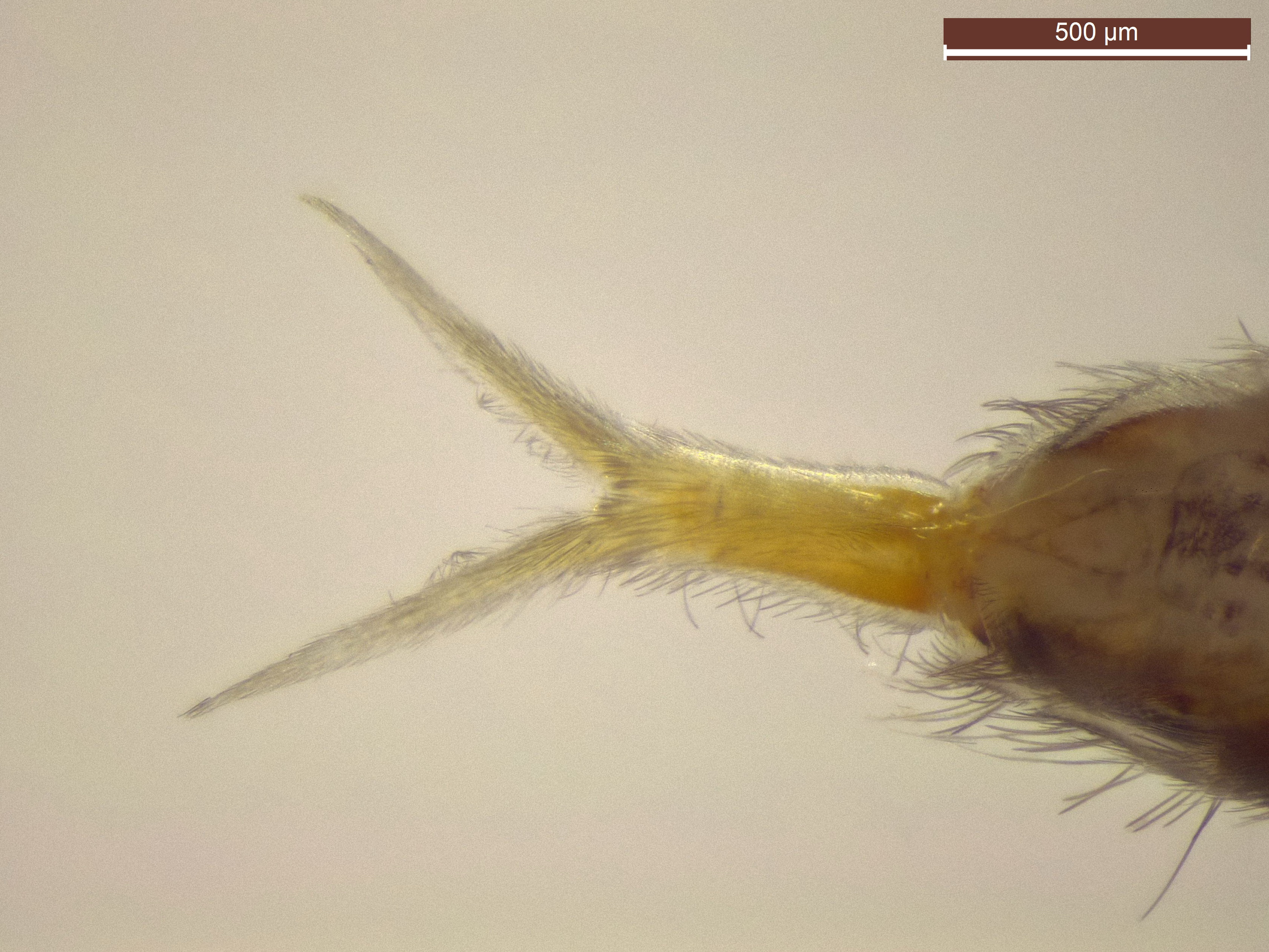
Orchesella cincta, furca

The furcula, or furca is a forked, tail-like appendage. It is present in most species of springtails, and in them it is attached ventrally to the fourth abdominal segment. The organ most often is present in species of Collembola that lives in the upper soil layers where it is used for jumping to avoid predators. While at rest, it is retracted under the abdomen and held there by a structure variously called the retinaculum or hamula, which in turn is located beneath the third abdominal segment. When the furcula escapes from retinaculum, it swings downwards and hits the substrate, propelling the springtail into the air. The animal does not use this mechanism for ordinary locomotion, but only for escaping from predators or severe stress.

One reason not to use the furcula for general locomotion other than to escape threats, is that its action is very unpredictable; when the furcula is released, the springtail is sent tumbling through the air on a practically arbitrary trajectory, and lands almost randomly. That may have advantages in escaping some forms of attack, but is not of much use in adopting any particular route.

Although the action of the furcula is hard to predict, it is versatile. Even a springtail drifting on the surface tension of a layer of water often can jump successfully. Furthermore, the furcula is effective in environments typical of Collembola; most predators of springtails are small and many have little power of sight, so if the prey leaps in time, the chances are that from the hunter's point of view, it simply vanishes.

Some species of Collembola, for instance in the genus Hypogastrura, have only a very short furcula. Some other species have no furcula at all; examples include the intertidal marine species Anurida maritima and some riparian species that live on the brink of flowing fresh water. The absence of a furcula in such species commonly is explained as an adaptation to a way of life in which a jumping or flying organ might get the animals into trouble more often than it rescues them. Its loss presumably is analogous to the loss of the ability to fly, such as is common among birds and insects inhabiting oceanic islands.

The furca allows for distant jumps relative to the body length. Entomobrya dorsalis which has a length of less than 2 mm long, uses their furca to jump up to 16 cm. Sminthurus viridis has a jump where the acceleration peaks were measured at 970 m / s², which corresponds to an acceleration of phenomenal 98.9 g (compared to 3.0 g for an astronaut during a space shuttle launch).

During the jumps, some species can perform several tumbles making their orientation unpredictable at the time of landing, after which they have the ability to recover very quickly. The body of Lepidocyrtus paradoxus (Entomobryomorph) remains relatively vertical with its head remaining at the top once during its jump, while the Hypogastrura socialis (Poduromorph) jumps forward with its head down and their body rotating on an axis.

In aquatic species, the mucron is often wider, more flattened in shape like a paddle, which allows it during jumps to be supported on the liquid without breaking the surface tension.
