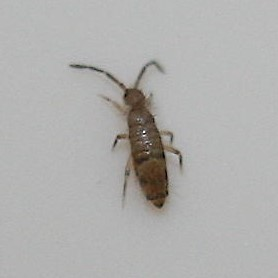
- Willowsia nigromaculata

Scientific classification
- Kingdom: Animalia
- Phylum: Arthropoda
- Class: Collembola
- Order: Entomobryomorpha
- Superfamily: Entomobryoidea
- Family: Entomobryidae

Subfamilies
- Entomobryinae; Lepidocyrtinae; Orchesellinae; Seirinae

= Entomobryidae =

Family of springtails

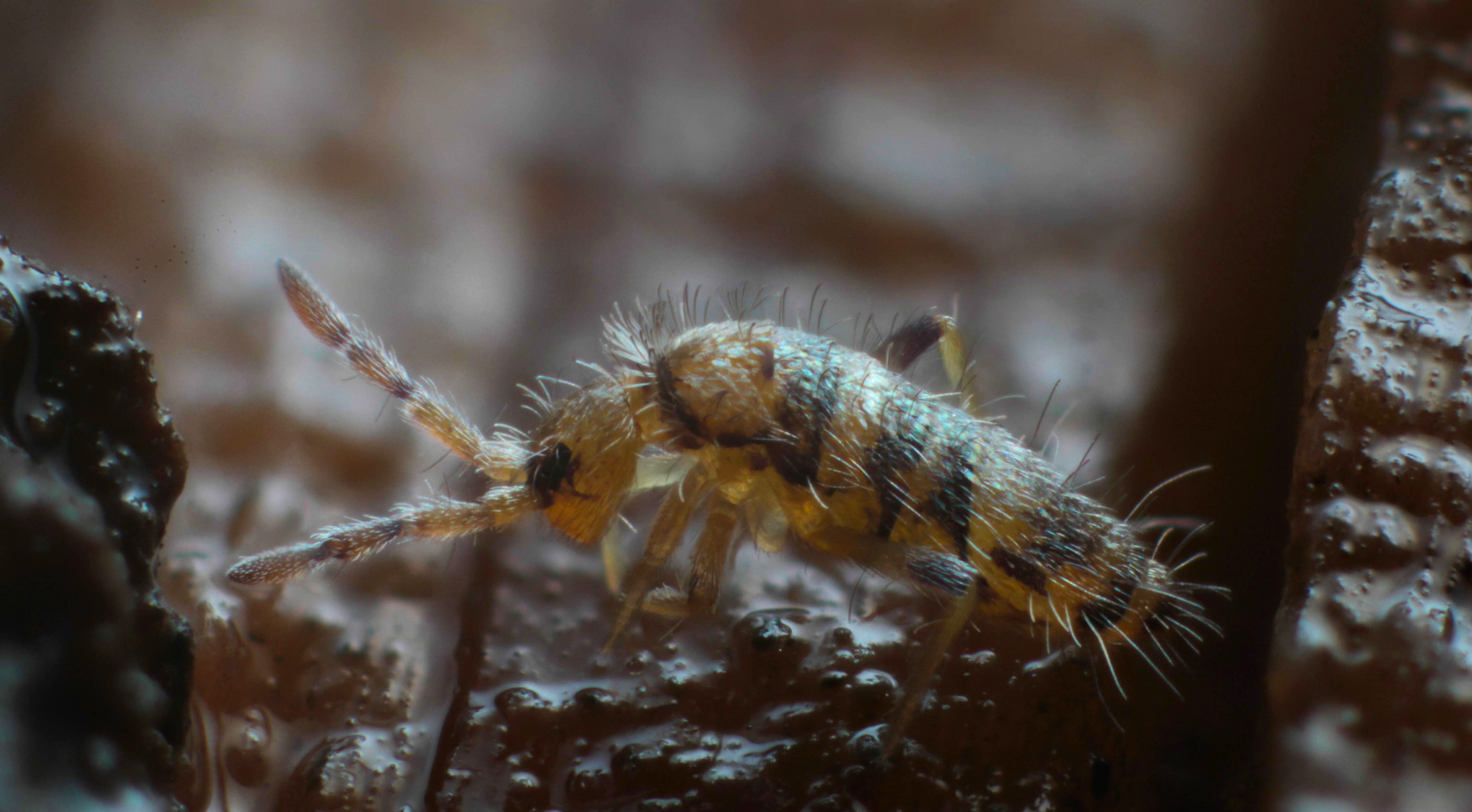
Willowsia platani

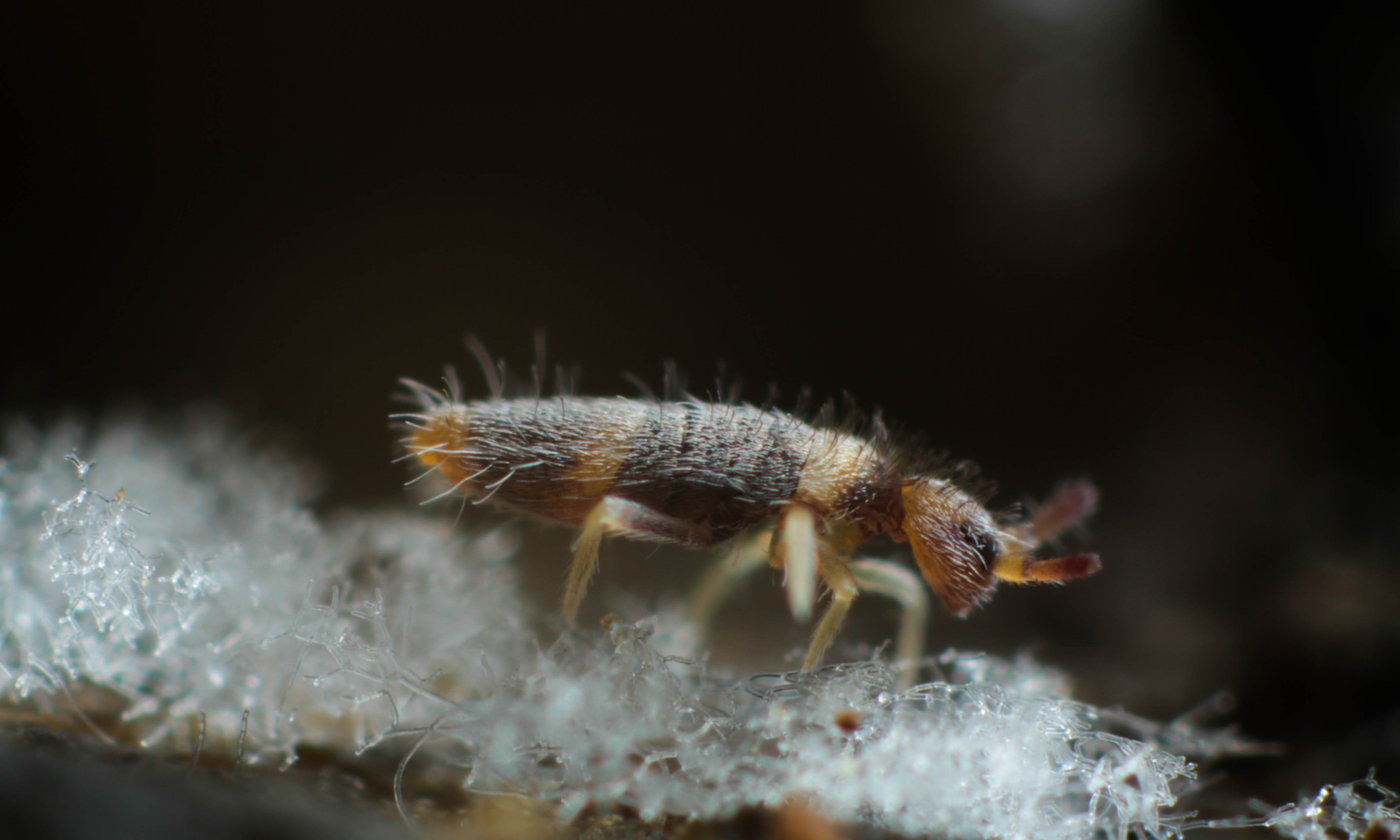
Entomobrya albocincta

Entomobryidae, sometimes called "slender springtails", is a family of springtails characterised by having an enlarged fourth abdominal segment and a well-developed furcula. Species in this family may be heavily scaled and can be very colourful. The scale-less Entomobryidae are commonly caught in pitfall traps around the planet, and also occur in canopy faunas high up in trees (notably Entomobrya nivalis, very common throughout Europe if not the Northern Hemisphere). There are more than 1700 described species in Entomobryidae.

== Description ==
This family has a reduced prothorax that lacks setae. The antennae are longer than the head diagonal. A mandibular plate is present. The abdominal segments are not fused. The body has trichobothria and thick clavate setae, and often scales as well. The dens is longer than the manubrium, tapering and annulated. The dentes are roughly parallel and distally curved. The mucro is small and has one or two teeth.

In more general terms, Entomobryidae tend to be relatively large springtails, reaching 2 mm or more. They may have stripes, bands or streaks of blue, red or purple. Some species are all blue or all white, the latter tending to also have reduced ocelli. Cave-dwelling species have long appendages and the claws are often modified.

== Ecology ==
On humid mornings, many entomobryid species climb herbaceous plants to feed on pollen and the spores of fungi.

Entomobryids have been found in brood galleries of bark beetles, where they are presumed to feed on fungi or act as saprophages.

Some species live in intertidal habitats.

Springtails of this family are prey for a range of predators, including various ground beetles, the shore bug Saldula saltatoria, soil centipedes, lady beetle larvae, ants and crab spiders.

== Genera ==
These 38 genera belong to the family Entomobryidae:

- Acanthurella Börner, 1906^{g}
- Acrocyrtus Yosii, 1959^{g}
- Amazhomidia^{g}
- Americabrya Mari Mutt & Palacios-vargas, 1987^{b}
- Aphysa Handschin, 1925^{g}
- Ascocyrtus Yosii, 1963^{g}
- Australotomurus Stach, 1947^{g}
- Bessoniella Deharveng & Thibaud, 1989^{g}
- Calx^{b}
- Coecobrya Yosii, 1956^{c g b}
- Corynothrix Tullberg, 1876^{i c g}
- Dicranocentrus Schött, 1893^{g}
- Drepanura Schoett, 1891^{c g b}
- Entomobrya Rondani, 1861^{i c g b}
- Entomobryoides Maynard, 1951^{g b}
- Epimetrura Schött, 1925^{g}
- Haloentomobrya Stach, 1963^{g}
- Hawinella Bellinger & Christiansen, 1974^{i c g}
- Heteromurus Wankel, 1860^{i c g b}
- Homidia Börner, 1906^{g b}
- Janetschekbrya Yosii, 1971^{i c g}
- Lepidobrya^{c g}
- Lepidocyrtoides Schött, 1917^{g}
- Lepidocyrtus Bourlet, 1839^{i c g b}
- Lepidosira^{c g}
- Mesentotoma^{b}
- Orchesella Templeton, 1758^{i c g b}
- Orchesellides Bonet, 1930^{i c g}
- Permobrya Riek, 1976^{g}
- Pseudosinella Schaeffer, 1897^{i c g b}
- Rhynchocyrtus de Mendoça & Fernandes, 2007^{g}
- Seira Lubbock, 1869^{i c g b}
- Sinella Brook, 1882^{i c g b}
- Sinelloides Bonet, 1942^{g}
- Sinhomidia Zhang, 2009^{g}
- Tyrannoseira Bellini & Zeppelini, 2011^{g}
- Verhoeffiella Absolon, 1900^{i g}
- Willowsia Shoebotham, 1917^{i c g b}

Data sources: i = ITIS, c = Catalogue of Life, g = GBIF, b = Bugguide.net
