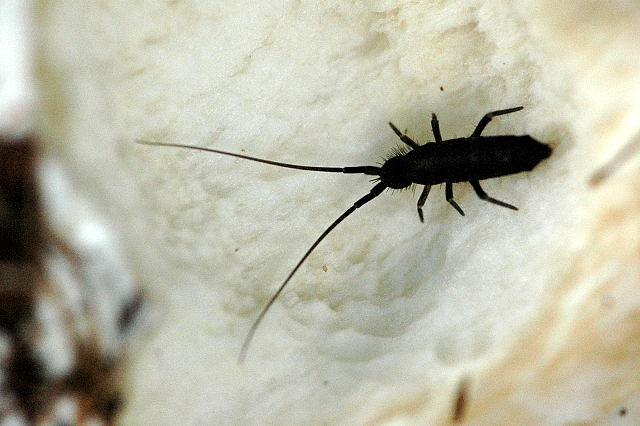
- Pogonognathellus longicornis (Tomoceroidea: Tomoceridae)

Scientific classification
- Kingdom: Animalia
- Phylum: Arthropoda
- Clade: Pancrustacea
- Class: Collembola
- Order: Entomobryomorpha

Superfamilies
- Coenaletoidea; Entomobryoidea; Isotomoidea; Tomoceroidea

= Entomobryomorpha =

Order of springtails

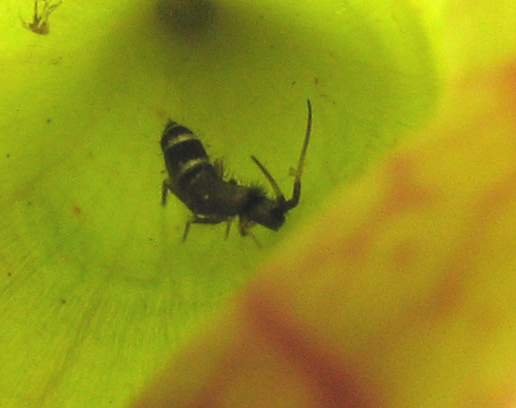
Tomoceridae trapped by Sarracenia purpurea.

The Entomobryomorpha are one of the three main orders of springtails (Collembola), tiny hexapods related to insects. This group was formerly treated as a superfamily, the Entomobryoidea.

They can be best distinguished from the other springtail groups by their body shape. The Symphypleona are very round animals, almost spherical. The Poduromorpha are also very plump but have a more oval shape. The Entomobryomorpha, by contrast, contain the slimmest springtails. They either have short legs and antennae, but their long bodies set them apart, or long legs and antennae, as well as well-developed furculae; these are the most characteristic members of the order.

== Systematics ==
The Entomobryomorpha were, as Entomobryoidea, united with the Poduromorpha (then called Poduroidea) in a group called "Arthropleona", but this has more recently turned out to be paraphyletic. Actually, the Entomobryomorpha, the Poduromorpha, and the third springtail lineage – the Symphypleona – are equally distinct from each other. Their treatment at equal taxonomic rank reflects this. Their rank has also varied a bit. When the springtails were still believed to be an order of insects, the "Arthropleona" and the Symphypleona were treated as suborders.

=== List of families ===
The superfamilies and families are arranged in the presumed evolutionary sequence. The list presented here follows a 2008 review of the Entomobryomorpha. The review abolishes the former "Actaletoidea", which is apparently paraphyletic; its namesake family is now placed in the Isotomoidea, while the Coenaletidae form a new monotypic superfamily. The former Cyphoderidae are demoted to a subfamily of the Paronellidae.

Superfamily Isotomoidea

- Family Isotomidae
- Family Actaletidae
- Family †Protentomobryidae (fossil)

Superfamily Coenaletoidea

- Family Coenaletidae

Superfamily Tomoceroidea

- Family Oncopoduridae
- Family Tomoceridae

Superfamily Entomobryoidea

- Family Paronellidae – includes Cyphoderidae
- Family Entomobryidae
- Family Microfalculidae
- Family †Oncobryidae
- Family †Praentomobryidae (fossil)
