= Lubbock (surname) =

Lubbock is a habitational English surname, derived from the city of Lübeck in Germany. It has been established in the eastern counties of England since the 13th century. Notable persons with the surname include:

- Alfred Lubbock (1845–1916), Kent county cricketer
- Basil Lubbock Alfred Basil Lubbock (1876–1944), British Yachtsman and Marine Author, particularly on clipper ships
- Edgar Lubbock (1847–1907), four times FA Cup Finalist who became a banker and Master of the Blankney Hunt
- Eric Lubbock, 4th Baron Avebury (1928–2016), Liberal Democrat member of the British House of Lords
- Francis Lubbock (1815–1905), Governor of Texas during the American Civil War and brother of Thomas
- Sir John Lubbock, 1st Baronet (1744–1816)
- Sir John Lubbock, 2nd Baronet (1774–1840)
- John William Lubbock, Sir John William Lubbock, 3rd Baronet (1803–1865), English banker, mathematician and astronomer
- Sir John Lubbock, 1st Baron Avebury (1834–1913), an English banker, politician, naturalist and archaeologist (son of Sir John William Lubbock)
- John Lubbock, 2nd Baron Avebury (1858–1929)
- John Lubbock, 3rd Baron Avebury (1915–1971)
- John Lubbock (conductor), British conductor
- Mark Lubbock (1898–1986), British conductor and composer of operetta and light music
- Michael Lubbock (1906–1989), English banker and businessman
- Sir Nevile Lubbock (1839–1914), Kent county cricketer
- Percy Lubbock (1879–1965), English writer
- Richard Lubbock (c. 1759–1808), English physician and chemist
- Stuart Lubbock, who died in suspicious circumstances in 2001
- Thomas Saltus Lubbock (1817–1862), a Confederate Colonel and Texas Ranger for whom the city and county in Texas are named
- William Lubbock (1701–1754), English divine

== Fictional ==
- The Lubbock family, fictional characters in the situation comedy Just the Ten of Us
- Lubbocks are mythical purple insectoid creatures in Diana Wynne Jones's House of Many Ways
