= Lubok (disambiguation) =

Lubok (Russian: Лубок) is a class of Russian popular prints, characterized by simple graphics and generally a narrative goal.

Lubok may also refer to:

- Lubok, a former Dutch name for Bawean, an island in Indonesia
- Lubok, Johor, a mukim (parish) in Malaysia

== See also ==
- Loboc
- Lubbock
