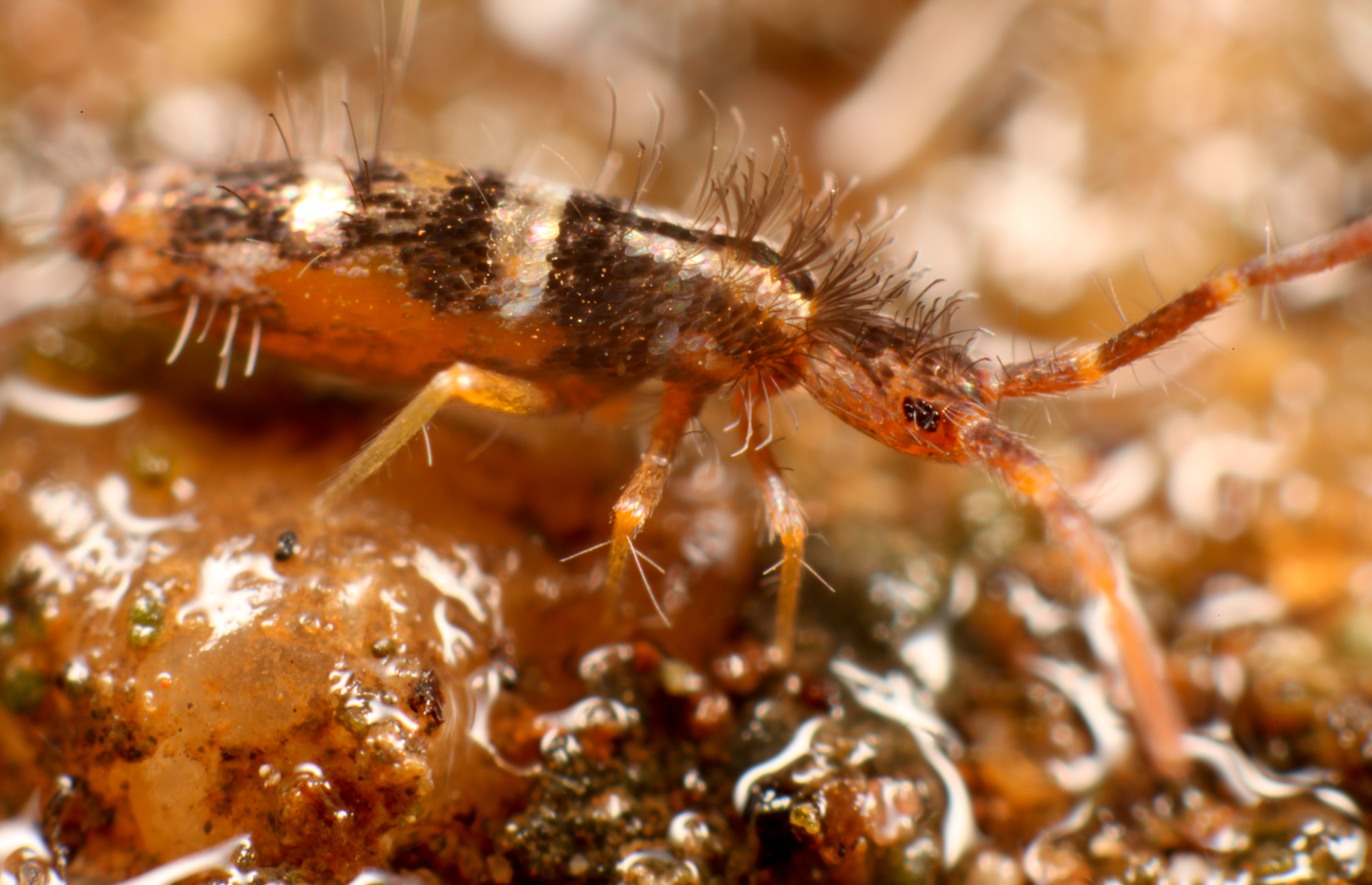
- Seira dollfusi

Scientific classification
- Domain: Eukaryota
- Kingdom: Animalia
- Phylum: Arthropoda
- Class: Collembola
- Order: Entomobryomorpha
- Family: Entomobryidae
- Genus: Seira; Lubbock, 1869

Synonyms
- Drepanocyrtus Tullberg, 1872; Lepidocyrtinus Schott, 1893; Pseudosira Boener, 1903; Sira Handschin, 1924

= Seira (springtail) =

Genus of springtails

Seira is a genus of slender springtails in the family Entomobryidae. There are about 17 described species in Seira.

== Species ==
- Seira bipunctata (Packard, 1873)
- Seira brasiliana (Arlé, 1939) Marcus, 1949
- Seira dollfusi Carl, 1899
- Seira domestica (Nicolet, 1842)
- Seira dubia Christiansen & Bellinger, 1980
- Seira gobalezai Christiansen and Bellinger, 1992
- Seira incolorata Denis, 1931
- Seira knowltoni (Wray, 1953)
- Seira lelo Christiansen and Bellinger, 1992
- Seira mexicana Folsom, 1898
- Seira pihulu Christiansen and Bellinger, 1992
- Seira prope-bipunctata
- Seira purpurea Schött, H, 1891
- Seira reinhardi (Mills, 1931)
- Seira squamoorrnata Stacherbakow, 1898
- Seira taeniata (Handschin, 1935)
- Seira terrestris (Folsom, 1932)
