= Luccock =

Luccock is a surname. Notable people with the surname include:

- Halford E. Luccock (1885–1960), American minister
- Naphtali Luccock (1853–1916), American bishop
- Samuel Luccock Black (1859–1929), American politician

== Surname ==
- Lubbock (disambiguation)
