= Caythorpe Court =

Country house in Lincolnshire, England

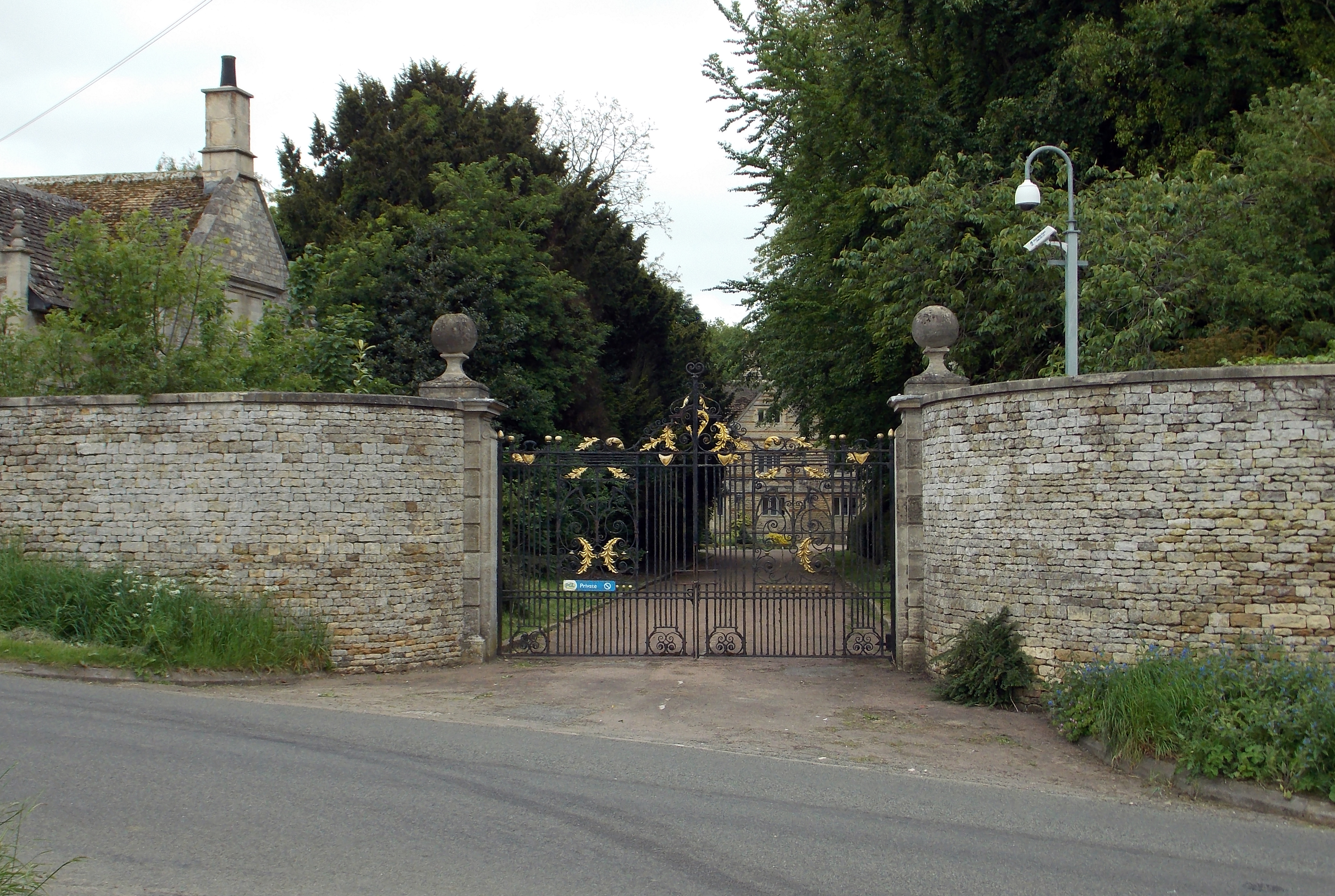
- Entrance gate to Caythorpe Court, with house beyond

General information
- Type: Country house
- Location: Caythorpe Heath Lane, Caythorpe, Grantham, Lincolnshire
- Coordinates: 53.0233°N 0.5738°W (grid reference SK9548)
- Owner: PGL

Technical details
- Grounds: 26 hectares (64 acres)

Caythorpe Court is a Grade II* listed former hunting lodge situated about one mile to the east of Caythorpe, Lincolnshire, England. It was originally built in 1901 for Edgar Lubbock, a brewer and banker, to the designs of Sir Reginald Blomfield. In 1946 it became the Kesteven Agricultural College, which was renamed the Lincolnshire College of Agriculture and Horticulture from September 1980. The college became the De Montfort School of Agriculture, but the site was closed in 2002. After being sold to property developers, who proposed to use it to house asylum seekers, it was acquired by PGL who now operate it as a centre for adventure based holidays for adults and children.

== History ==
=== Edgar Lubbock ===
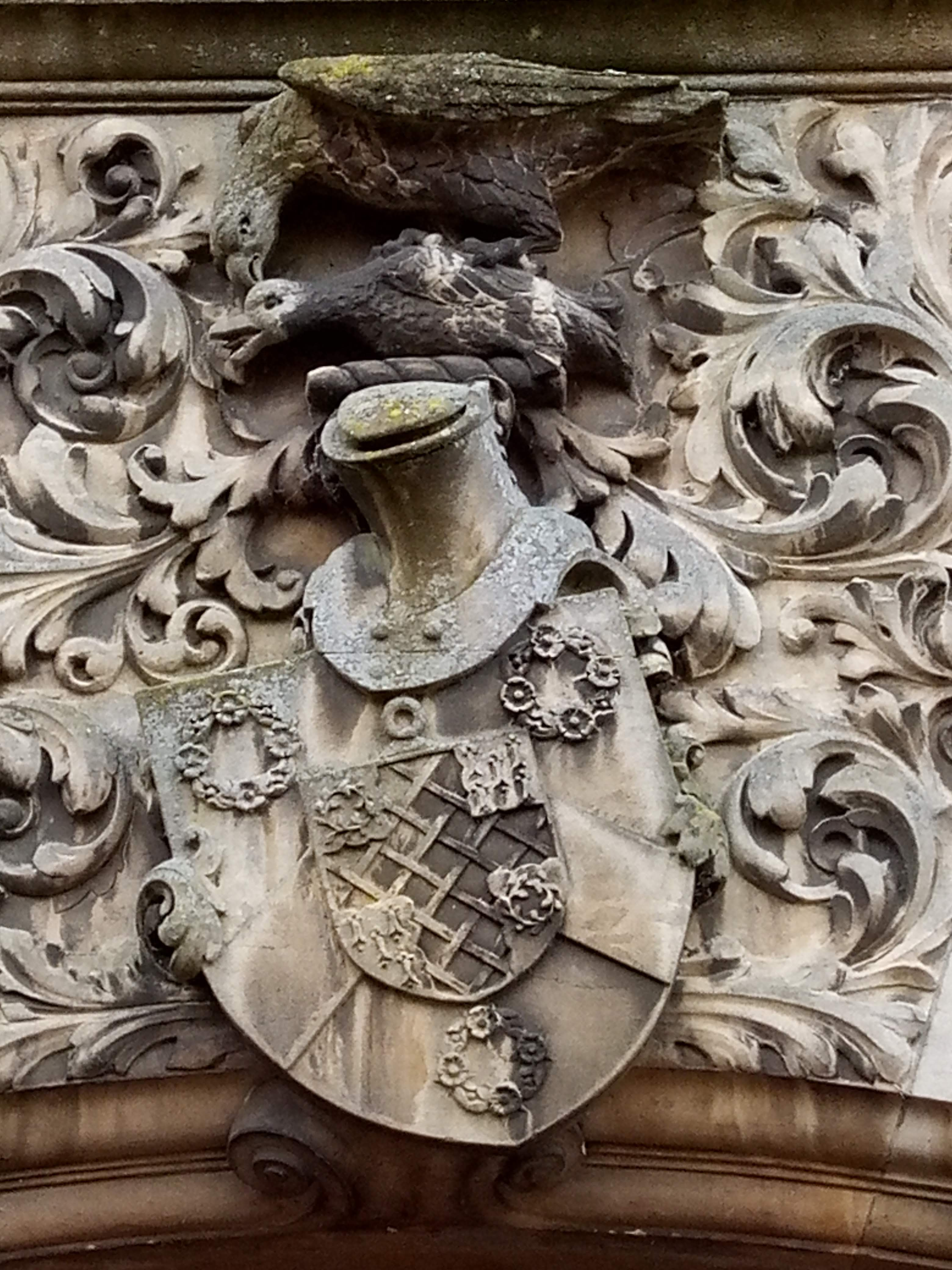

The site was originally occupied by a farm which was owned by the local church, farmed by the parson. The farm was acquired in the 1890s by Edgar Lubbock, who was a director of the Bank of England and of Whitbread Brewery. In 1899 Lubbock instructed Sir Reginald Blomfield to design a hunting lodge in the grounds of the farm; the lodge was built in 1901–1903. During the construction a stable for fifty horses was built: Lubbock was appointed Master of the Blankney Hunt in 1904. Originally known as "Mansion House", by 1904 it had acquired the name "Caythorpe Court". The original gardens were also designed by Blomfield.

=== Elma Yerburgh ===
Lubbock died in September 1907 and following his death the house was acquired by Mrs. Elma Yerburgh who had assumed control of the Blackburn-based Thwaites Brewery on the death of her father in 1888. Mrs. Yerburgh owned several properties of which Caythorpe Court was the smallest, being referred to by her as "The Cottage". During Mrs. Yerburgh's ownership, the gardens were re-designed by Percy Cane.

During the First World War the property was used as an Auxiliary Military Hospital; in the Second World War it became the headquarters for the 1st Airborne Division Signals. Mrs. Yerburgh died in December 1946; her will requested that the estate should be sold to become an agricultural education establishment. She also requested that the main buildings (the court itself, together with the lodge and Arnhem Court) should be maintained as near as possible in their original condition.

The house stands in grounds of 26 hectares (64 acres).

=== Kesteven Agricultural College ===
Lincolnshire County Council purchased the estate in 1948 together with additional agricultural land and Kesteven Farm Institute was opened. In the mid-1960s the Institute became the Kesteven Agricultural College. In 1980 this amalgamated with two other agricultural colleges, Holbeach and Riseholme, to become the Lincolnshire College of Agriculture and Horticulture, LCAH, which in 1994 became part of the Leicester-based De Montfort University.

In the 1960s student halls of residence were built in the grounds of the original house. The new buildings were named after local towns: Stamford, Grantham, Lincoln and Sleaford. Later, while part of the De Montford University, another complex consisting of Boston, Brownlow, Bourne and Louth Halls was built on the former rugby and football pitches. In addition to the three main buildings and the student halls of residence there were other properties including:

- The Stable Block, known as 'Arnhem Block,' which housed the resident warden, a number of students, a games room and a telephone box.
- eight semi-detached houses used originally for estate workers and later for college staff.
- The Lodge House, used by the principal at the time of Mr J Rowland and Mr J Dyson. In 1983 a new bungalow, taking much of the walled garden area, was built for LCAH principal Mr S Readman.
- a 1960s teaching block, with classrooms and laboratories, also contained the sports hall which doubled as a cinema with purpose-built projection room and a student union bar.

In October 2001 the Lincolnshire School of Agriculture was transferred to the University of Lincoln, and in September 2002 the Caythorpe Campus was closed, with its courses being relocated to Riseholme College.

=== Potential use as asylum centre ===
Following the closure of the college, the property was purchased by the Angel Group Plc in October 2002 for £2.7 million. Angel Group was a property company contracted by the National Asylum Support Service to house refugees and asylum seekers. The Angel Group initially acquired the property with plans to convert it into a private residential estate; when asked by NASS if they had any properties that could be used for short-term emergency accommodation for asylum-seekers, the company offered Caythorpe Court as a potential site.

In December 2002, the Caythorpe Action Group was formed to fight any proposal to use the site as an asylum centre and represent local concerns. Caythorpe Court was one of several properties which were being considered by the Home Office as suitable to house asylum seekers.

On 27 January 2003, local Member of Parliament, Douglas Hogg, asked the Secretary of State about the possible use of Caythorpe Court for the accommodation of asylum seekers and what plans the Home Department and its agencies had for the accommodation of asylum seekers there. In reply Beverley Hughes, the Minister of State for Immigration, Citizenship and Counter-Terrorism said: "The National Asylum Support Service (NASS) is considering the use of Caythorpe Court as emergency accommodation for asylum seekers while their application for support and dispersal elsewhere is considered. No decision has yet been made."

At the end of January 2003, the Angel Group were advised by the Home Office that it had decided not to use Caythorpe Court as "short-term accommodation for asylum-seekers" but it was subsequently revealed that Caythorpe Court remained on offer as a potential large-scale accommodation centre for asylum-seekers. At the end of March 2003, the Angel Group confirmed that there had been no approaches to use the complex as an asylum accommodation centre. The company intended to revert to its original plan for the site, to establish a residential estate with properties sold to owner-occupiers. Despite this, the company said that it was not excluding use of Caythorpe Court as an asylum or refugee centre should this planning application be refused. Subsequently, there were proposals that the former college could be used as a rehabilitation centre for recovering drug addicts or ex-prisoners.

In early 2005, the site was sold to the PGL Group for an undisclosed sum.

== PGL Travel Limited ==
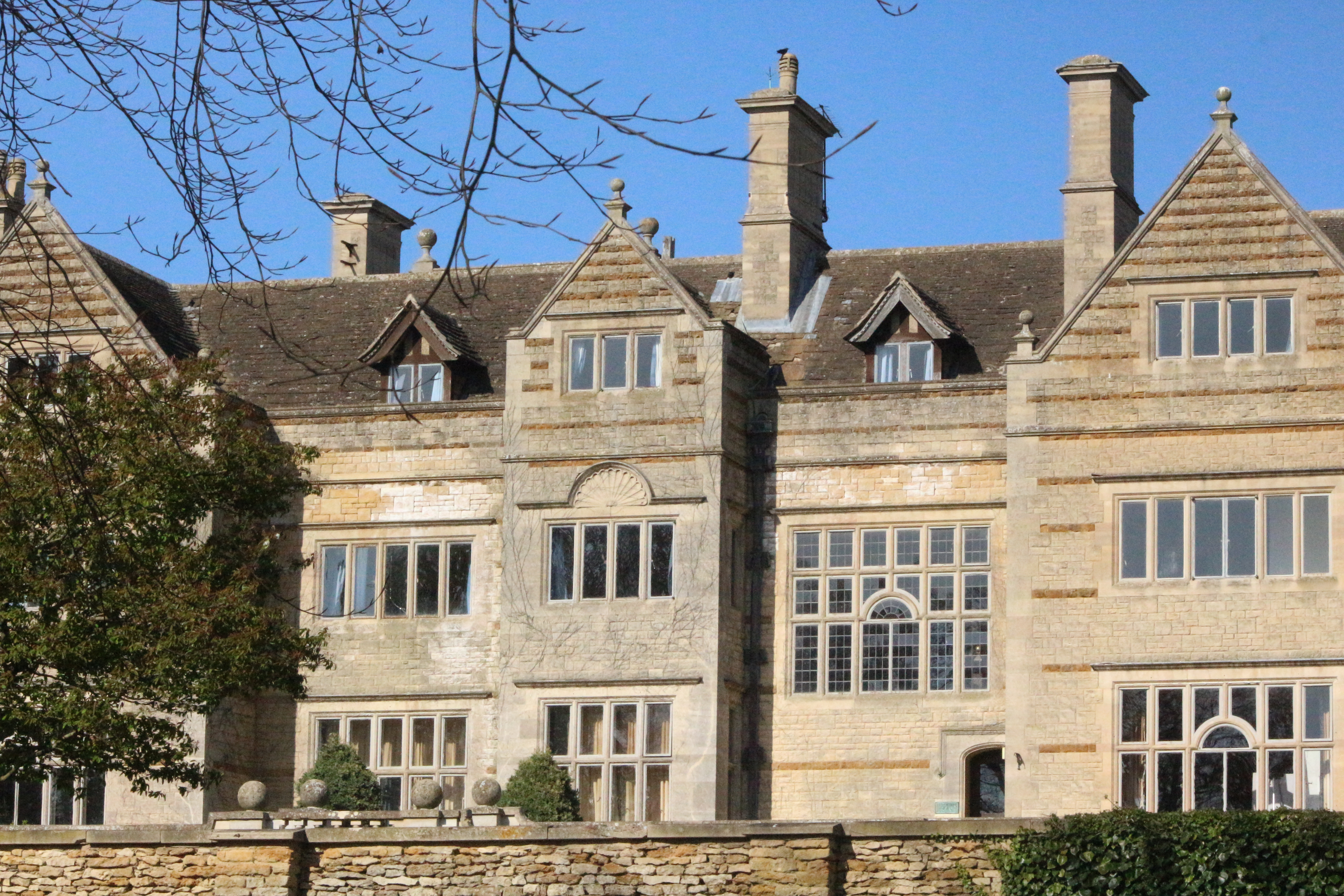
Rear view of The Courthouse, taken from the lower lawn. Arnhem Court is used as staff accommodation and car park.

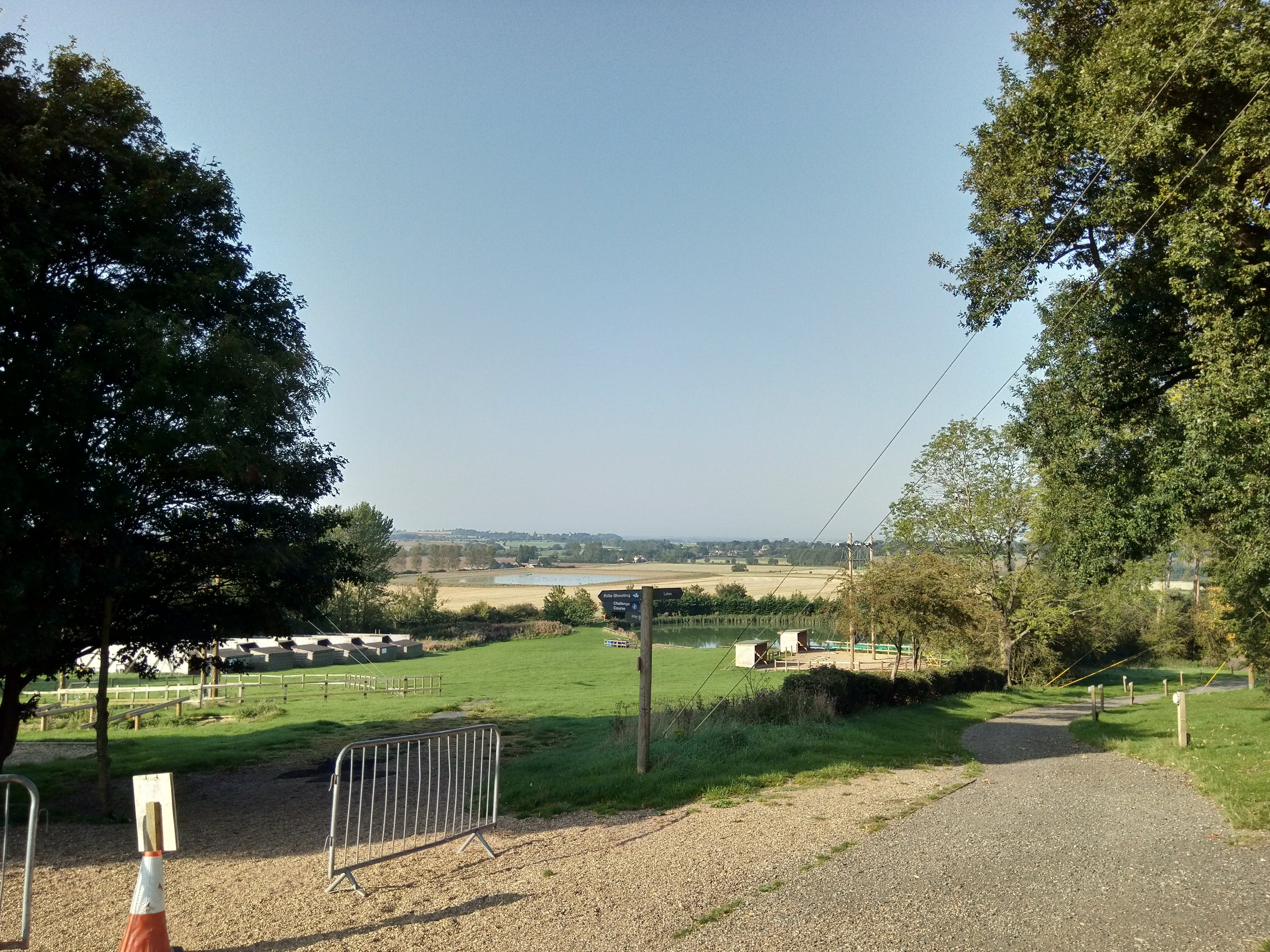
The lower fields of the grounds include two purpose-built lakes for paddlesports, various ropes courses and an archery range.

Following its acquisition of the former college, PGL announced that it intended to spend an initial £2 million on the centre with a view to re-opening it in March 2006. The plans included a man-made lake, orienteering course and archery facilities with an all-weather pitch, theatre and bar, hedge maze, field study centre and rifle range. Caythorpe Court would be used as a residential activity centre for school groups during term time and as a centre for family activity breaks in school holidays. The site would accommodate 400 guests and 80 members of staff, with many being recruited locally. The centre was opened in the spring of 2006 after updating the accommodation blocks and provision of activities such as zip-wire, archery, trapeze, high ropes and kayaking. There were plans to a further £4 million over the following two years, including renovating the lodge building, providing new timber lodges for guests, renovating the sports barn to include a climbing wall and development of a walled garden and lake.

New dining facilities, designed by Architects NBDA were opened in October 2007. In May 2008, Douglas Hogg opened the new lodge and campsite complex on which a sum in the region of £1.2 million had been spent. The complex would provide additional accommodation for 330 children.

At an "Investor Day" in September 2009, PGL's parent company, Holidaybreak plc, announced that the total expenditure on Caythorpe Court was £13.8 million.

Enactus UK (formerly known as SIFE Students_in_Free_Enterprise) had a long association with PGL Caythorpe Court and has regularly held training weekends at the site.

The PGL site was used as a Strategic Evacuation Centre by Lincolnshire County Council in response to the East Coast Tidal Surge on 5 December 2013. PGL staff working at the site over the winter period quickly prepared accommodation and food provision for incoming residents of Boston, Lincolnshire who were at risk due to flooding in the town.

PGL Caythorpe Court has annually supported the Battle of Arnhem Memorial weekend which is held in the local village of Caythorpe, Lincolnshire providing accommodation to visiting veterans of the 216 Airborne Signals Regiment and their families, and providing staff to assist in the running of the annual Gala event.

In 2018, Caythorpe Court began undergoing major updates, including a new 200 bed guest accommodation block (named after the local village of Cranwell) and a new staff accommodation unit named after Isaac Newton, who has strong associations with the local town of Grantham. The site also improved and expanded existing ropes courses, zip lines and land activities. Extra classroom space was added for its English Language school and an accessible path added in the lower fields.
