= Seira knowltoni =

Scientific classification
- Domain: Eukaryota
- Kingdom: Animalia
- Phylum: Arthropoda
- Class: Collembola
- Order: Entomobryomorpha
- Family: Entomobryidae
- Genus: Seira
- Species: S. knowltoni

Binomial name
- Seira knowltoni (Wray, 1953)

Synonyms
- Drepanocyrtus knowltoni Wray, 1953

Species of springtail

Seira knowltoni is a species of slender springtail in the family Entomobryidae.
