= Seira dubia =

Scientific classification
- Domain: Eukaryota
- Kingdom: Animalia
- Phylum: Arthropoda
- Class: Collembola
- Order: Entomobryomorpha
- Family: Entomobryidae
- Genus: Seira
- Species: S. dubia

Binomial name
- Seira dubia Christiansen & Bellinger, 1980

Species of springtail

Seira dubia is a species of slender springtail in the family Entomobryidae.
