= High Elms Country Park =

Public park in Greater London

Coordinates: 51.351°N 0.075°E

High Elms
- Site of Special Scientific Interest
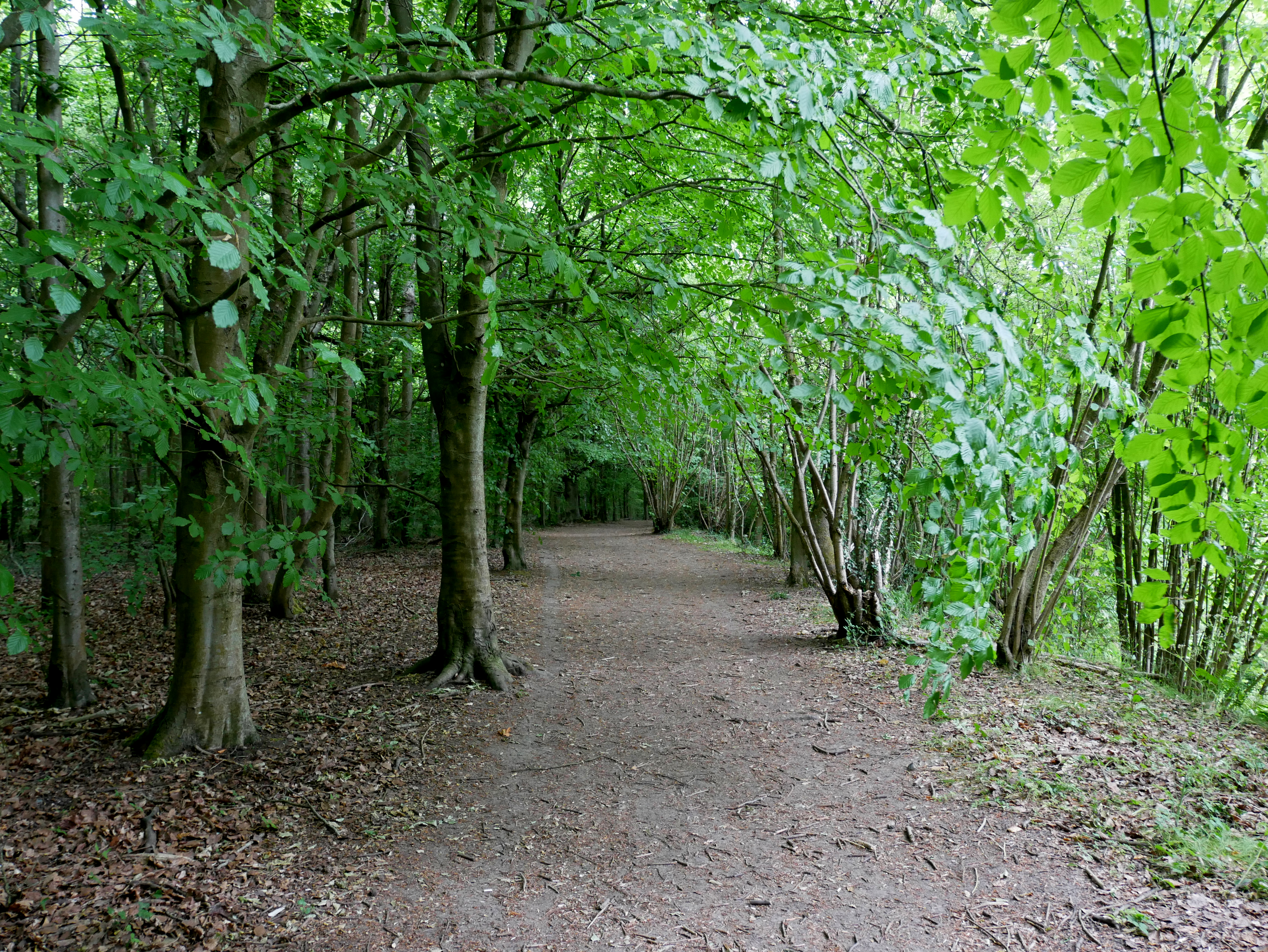
- A path through the woodland at High Elms Country Park
- Location of High Elms.
- Area of search: Greater London
- Grid reference: TQ446625
- Interest: Biological
- Area: 69.1 ha (171 acres)
- Notification date: 1981; 45 years ago
- Location map: Magic Map

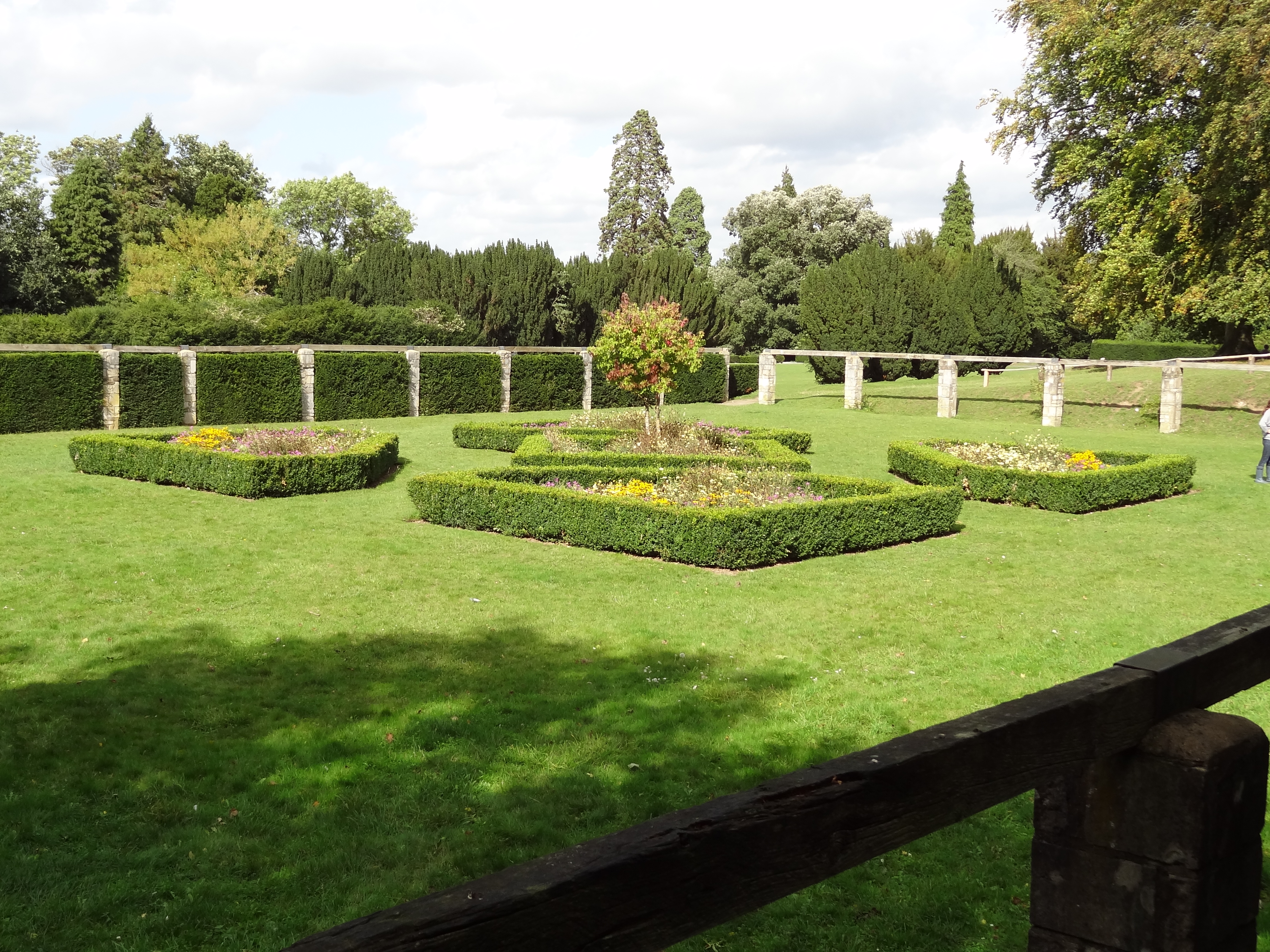
Formal flower beds

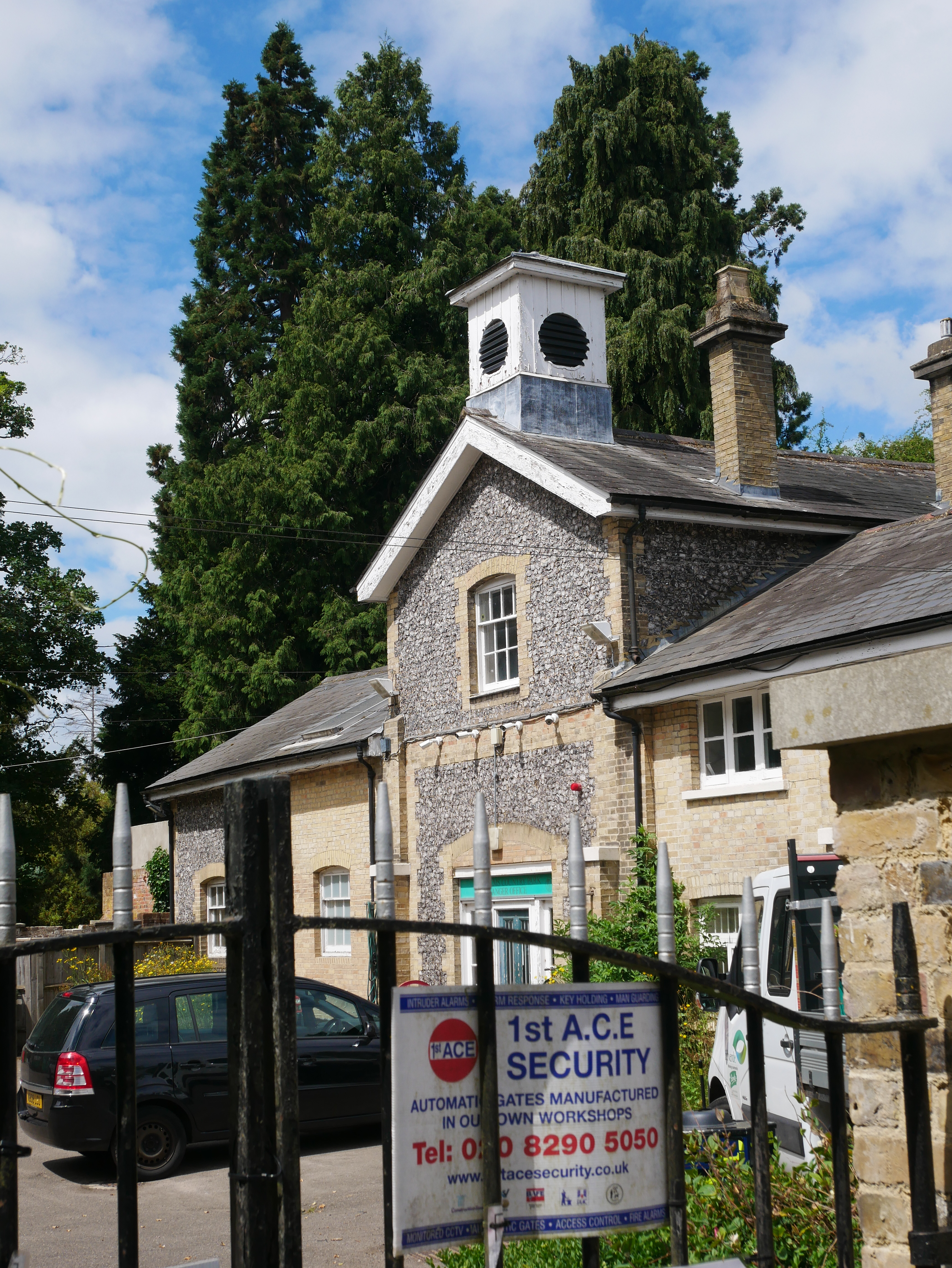
The former stable block

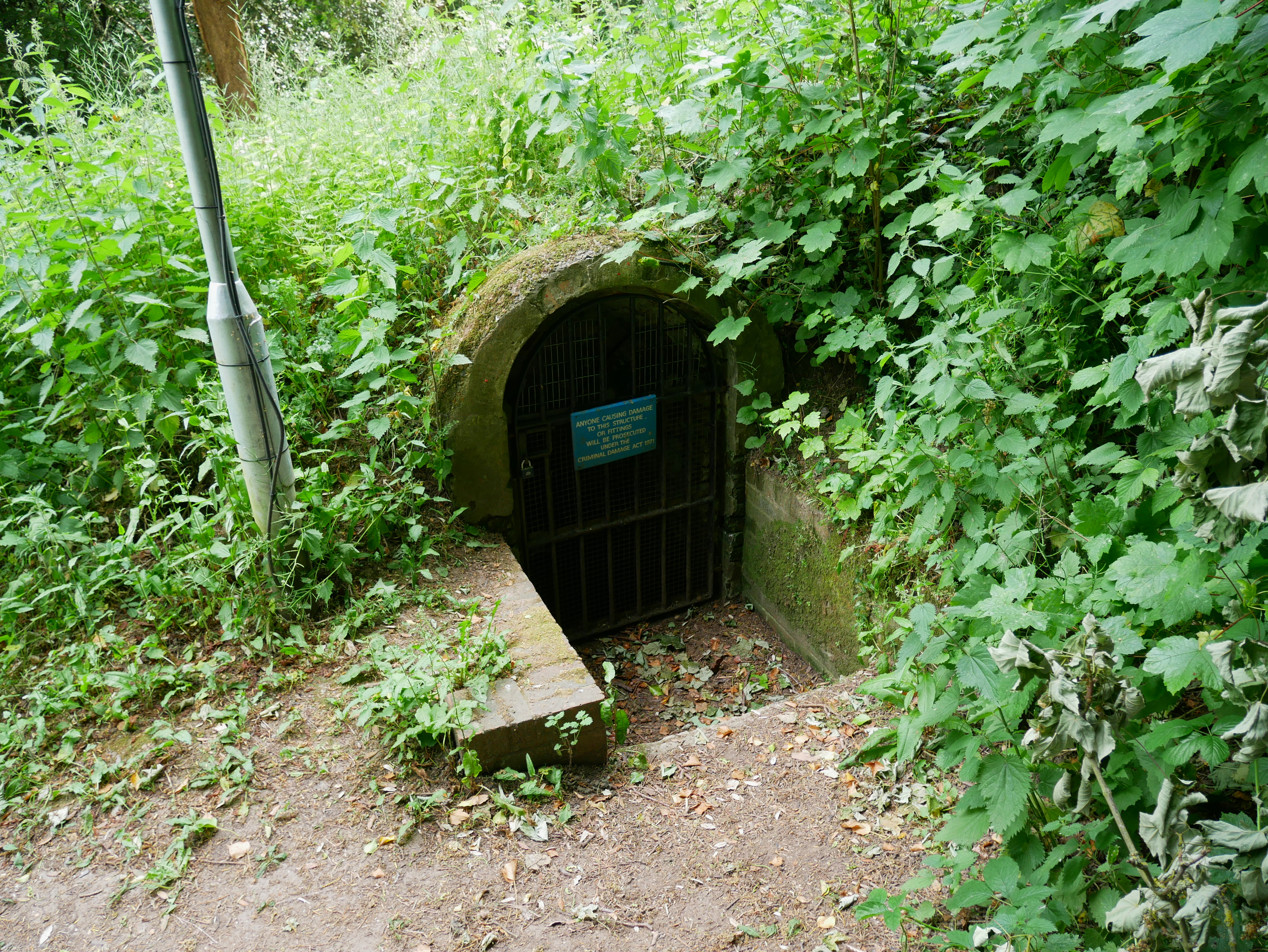
The Grade II-listed ice well

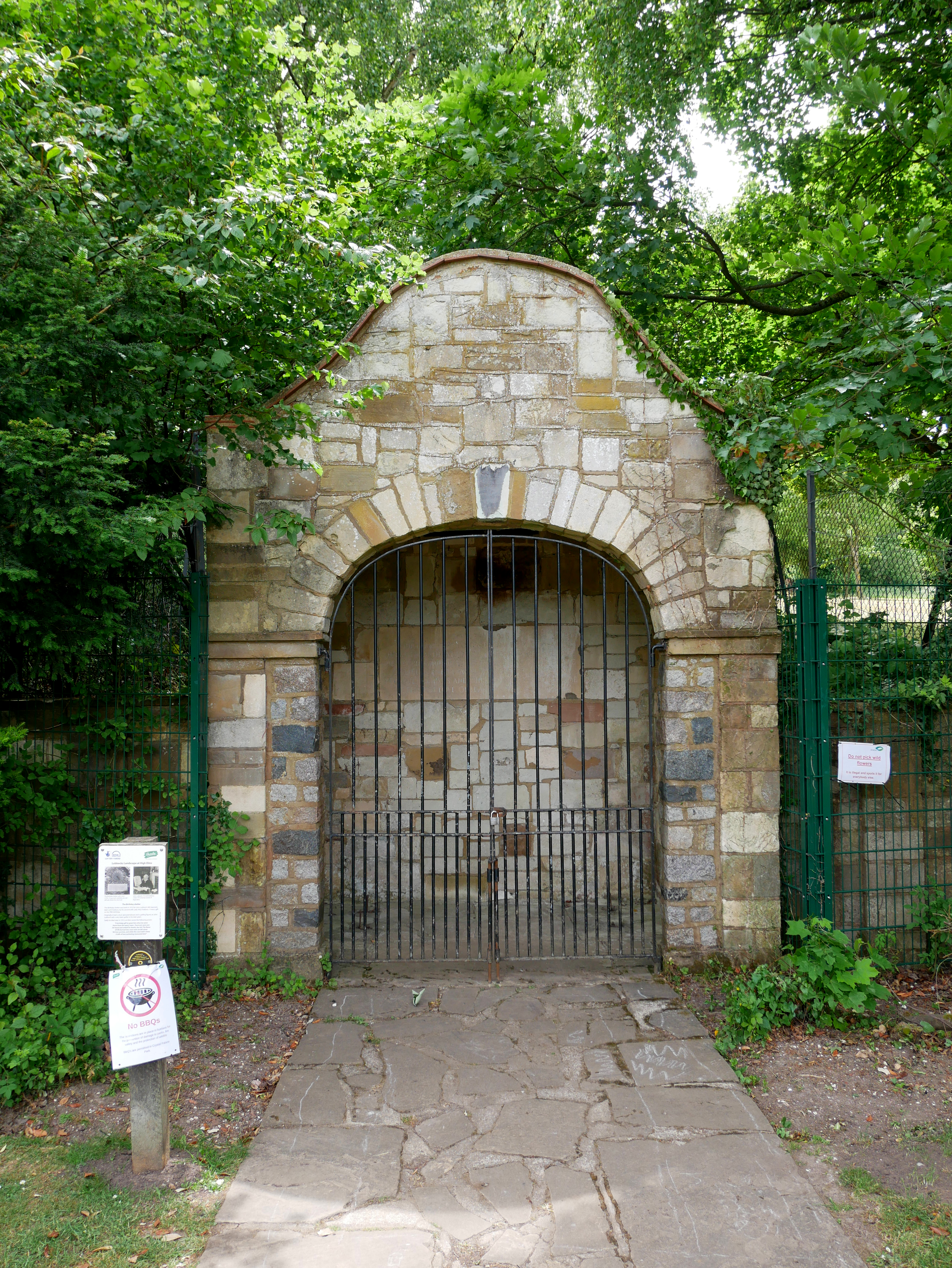
The Grade II-listed garden shelter, created in 1913

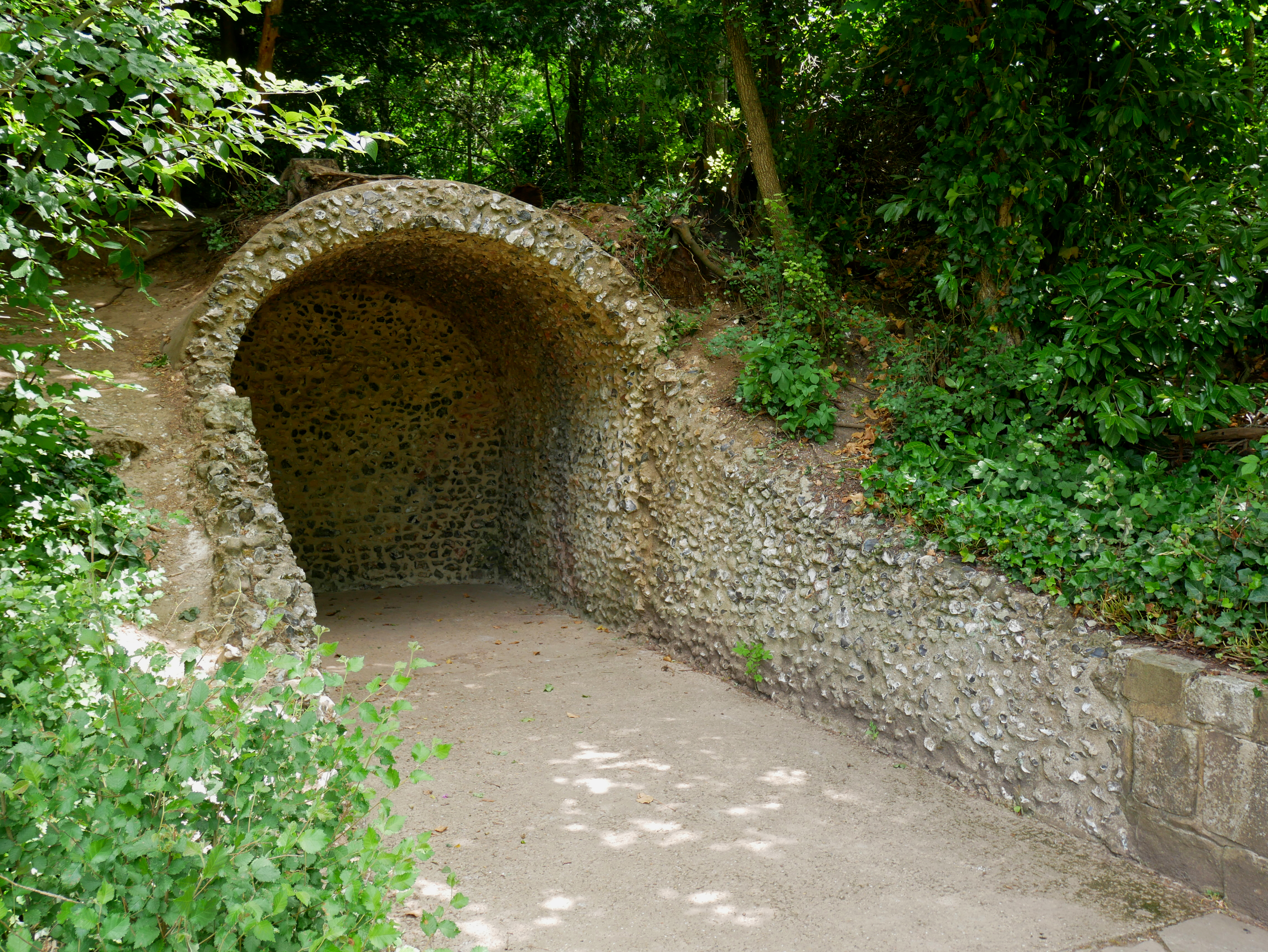
The Grade II-listed grotto

High Elms Country Park is an extensive 250-acre (100 ha) public park on the North Downs in Farnborough in the London Borough of Bromley. It is a Local Nature Reserve, and together with the neighbouring Downe Bank, a Site of Special Scientific Interest. The park surrounds High Elms Golf Course, and has extensive woodland, chiefly oak and beech, chalk meadows and formal gardens. It also has a cafe, a visitor centre, nature and history trails and car parks.

The idverde Countryside Team, who manage Bromley owned parks, are based at High Elms.

There is access to this place from High Elms Road and Shire Lane.

== History ==
The history of the High Elms estate can be traced back to the Norman Conquest, when it was given by William the Conqueror to his half-brother, Odo, bishop of Bayeux. For successive generations afterwards the land occupied now by the golf course was given over to farming. In 1809, a wealthy London banker and Member of Parliament, John William Lubbock (2nd Baronet), bought the 260 acres now known as the High Elms Estate as a country residence.

In 1840 it was inherited by his son, the astronomer and banker Sir John Lubbock, 3rd Baronet, who built a grand new mansion in the Italian style. His son, also called John Lubbock, had been born in 1834. When Charles Darwin moved in 1842 into the nearby Down House on the other side of the village of Downe, he had told his sister "The great Astronomer Sir J. Lubbock is owner of 3000 acres here, & is building a grand house a mile off—I believe he is very reserved & shy & proud or fine—so I suspect he will be no catch, & will never honour us". Young John befriended Darwin, and was a frequent visitor to Down House. In 1865 John became the fourth baronet, and in 1900 Baron Avebury.

In 1938 the estate was sold to Kent County Council and the house became a nurses' training centre. In 1965 the area became part of the London Borough of Bromley, and the estate was transferred to the new borough. The land then became public open space, but in 1967 the mansion burnt down.

== Listed buildings ==
There are the following Grade II Listed Buildings in and around the park:

Eighteenth-century gate piers and wrought iron railings
Cuckoo Lodge
Eton fives court, built about 1840
Grotto, constructed between 1885 and 1896
Ice well, constructed about 1850
Old Lodge, early nineteenth-century cottage
Outhouse at the Clock House, probably a granary with a horse gin, early nineteenth century
Stone garden shelter, circa 1913
The Clock House, early nineteenth-century stables of High Elms converted to a house

== BEECHE ==
Bromley Council has established the Bromley Environmental Education Centre at High Elms (BEECHE) at the park, with environmental programmes for schools and public events in the school holidays.

== See also ==
- Bromley parks and open spaces
- List of Sites of Special Scientific Interest in London
- List of Local Nature Reserves in Greater London
