= Constance Anne Herschel =

Scientist and mathematician

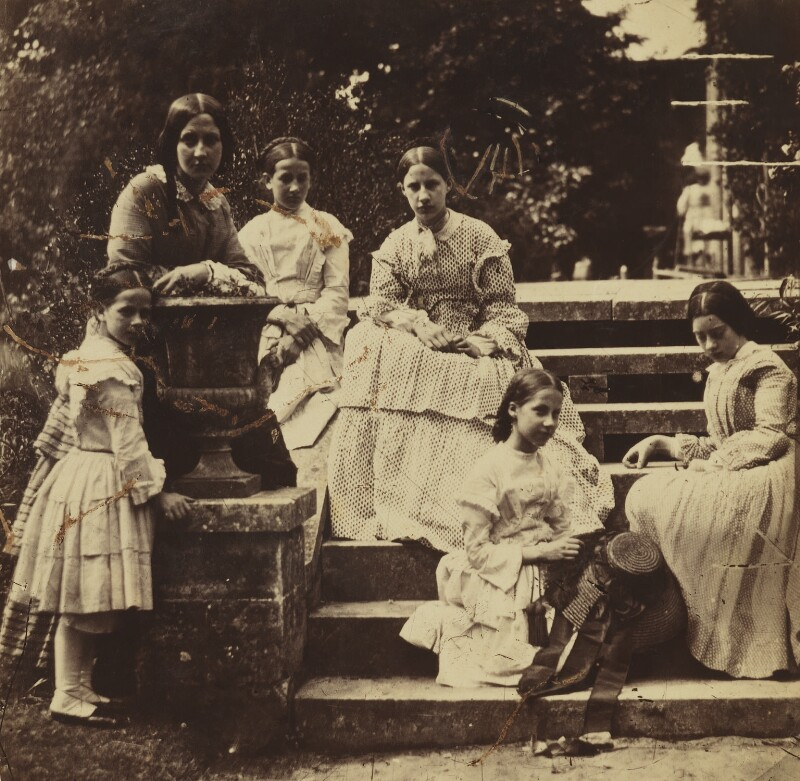
Constance Anne Herschel as a child, far left, posing with the other daughters of John Herschel

Constance Anne Herschel (1855 – 20 June 1939), later known as Lady Lubbock, was a scientist and mathematician.

Herschel held the post of resident lecturer in natural sciences and mathematics at Girton College, Cambridge.

She was the child of Sir John Herschel, and the grandchild of William Herschel. She wrote a family history of the famous scientific dynasty by compiling family sources, 'The Herschel Chronicle'.

She married Sir Nevile Lubbock.
