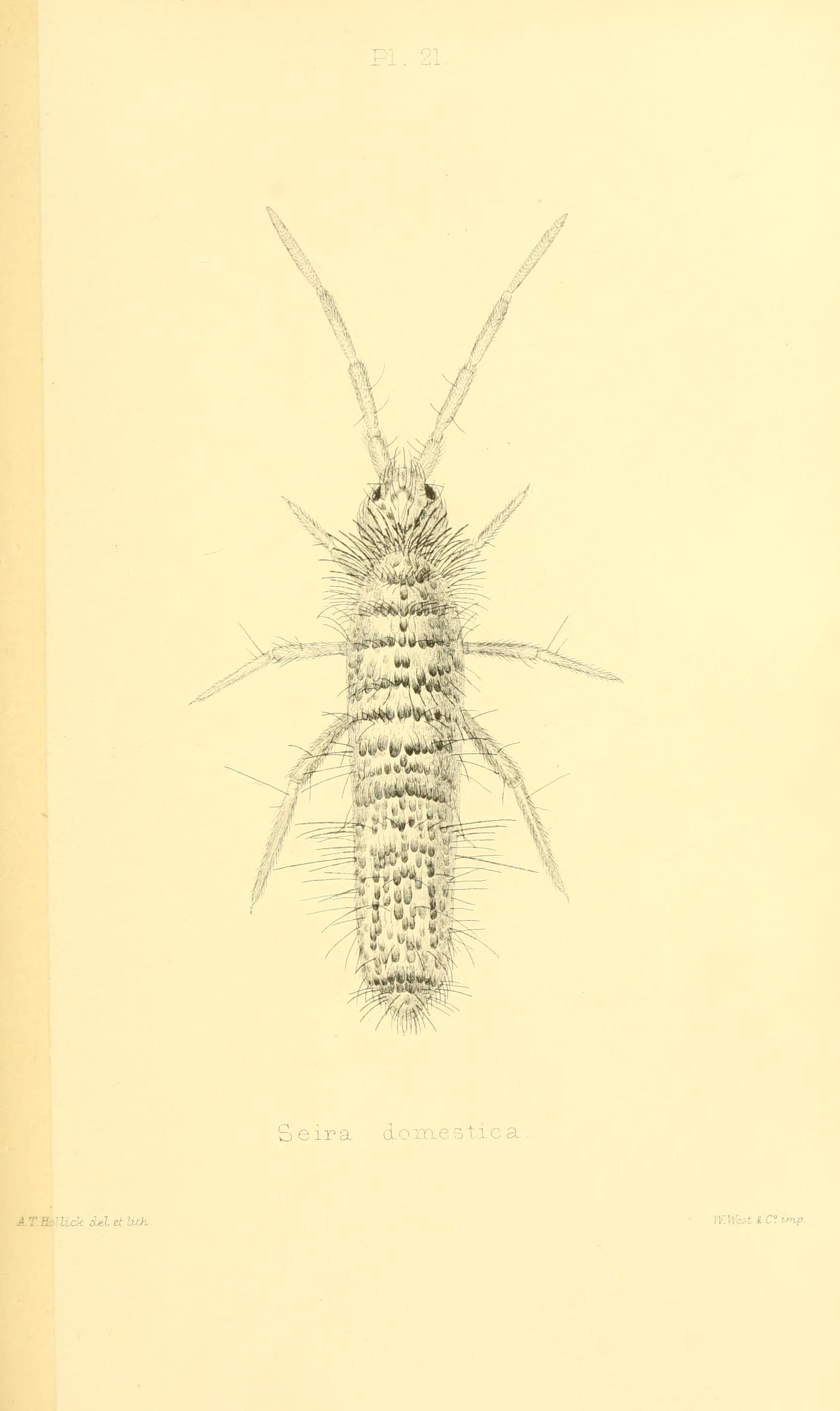

Scientific classification
- Kingdom: Animalia
- Phylum: Arthropoda
- Class: Collembola
- Order: Entomobryomorpha
- Family: Entomobryidae
- Genus: Seira
- Species: S. domestica

Binomial name
- Seira domestica (Nicolet, 1842)

Synonyms
- Degeeria domestica Nicolet, 1842

= Seira domestica =

Species of springtail

Seira domestica is a species in the family Entomobryidae ("slender springtails"), in the order Entomobryomorpha ("elongate-bodied springtails"). This species was first described by Hercule Nicolet in 1842 and originally named Degeeria domestica.
