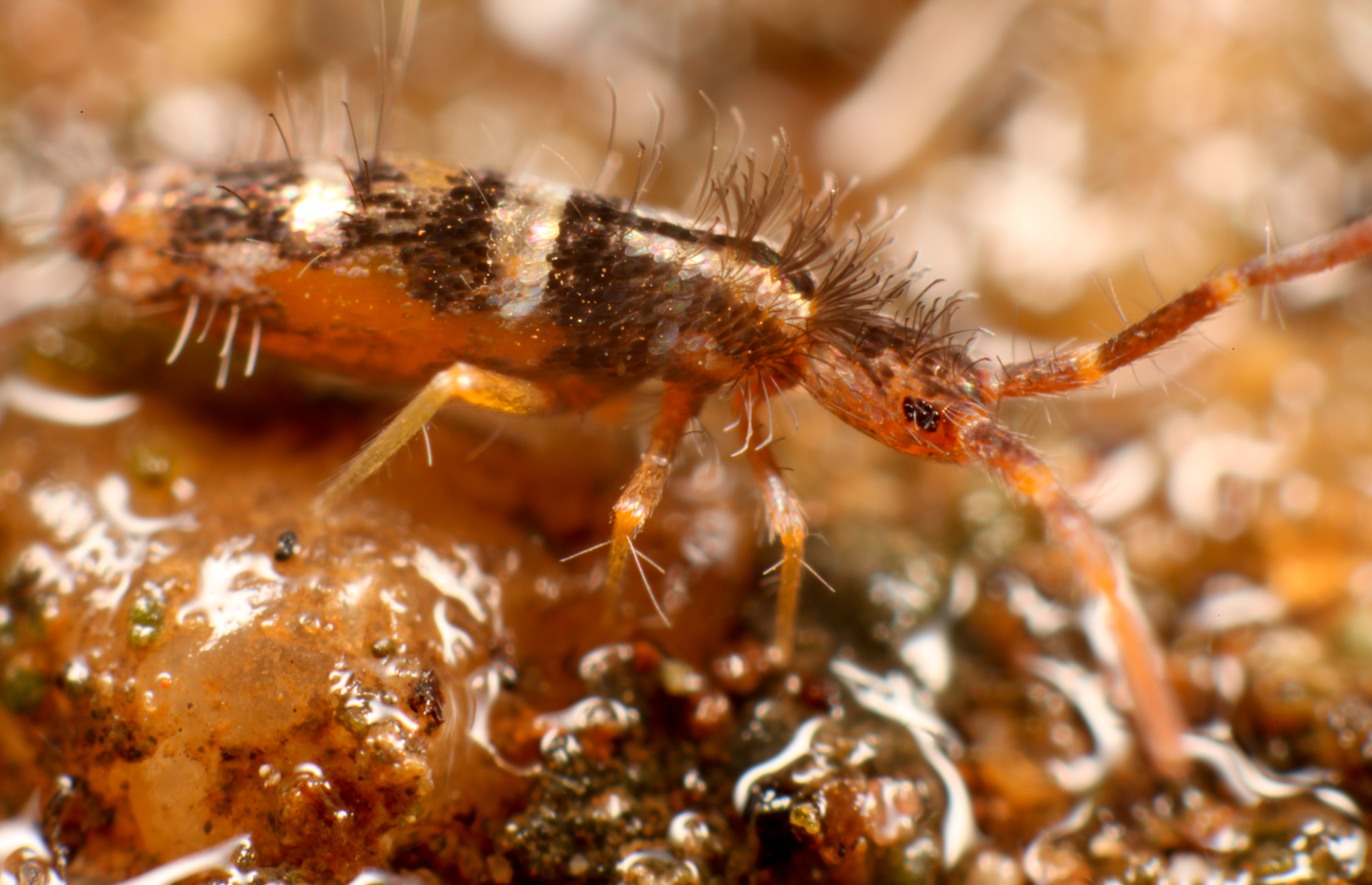

Scientific classification
- Domain: Eukaryota
- Kingdom: Animalia
- Phylum: Arthropoda
- Class: Collembola
- Order: Entomobryomorpha
- Family: Entomobryidae
- Genus: Seira
- Species: S. dollfusi

Binomial name
- Seira dollfusi Carl, 1899

= Seira dollfusi =

Species of springtail

Seira dollfusi is a species of slender springtail in the family Entomobryidae.
