= Seira bipunctata =

Scientific classification
- Domain: Eukaryota
- Kingdom: Animalia
- Phylum: Arthropoda
- Class: Collembola
- Order: Entomobryomorpha
- Family: Entomobryidae
- Genus: Seira
- Species: S. bipunctata

Binomial name
- Seira bipunctata (Packard, 1873)

Synonyms
- Lepidocyrtus bipunctata Packard, 1873

Species of springtail

Seira bipunctata is a species of slender springtail in the family Entomobryidae.
