= Edgar Lubbock =

English footballer

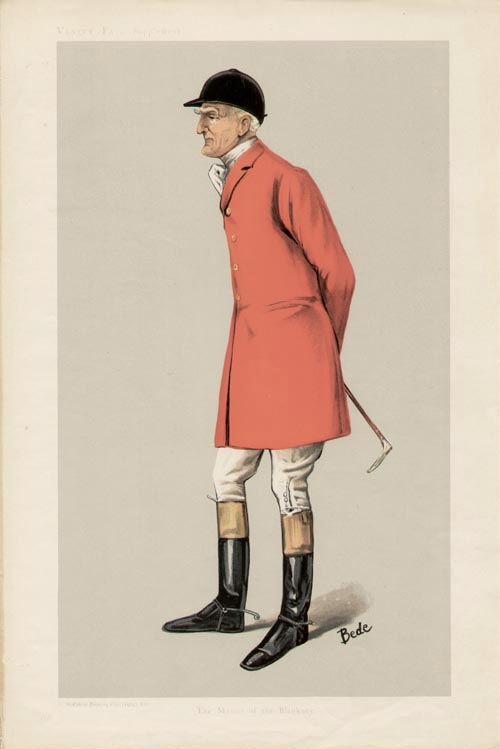
- Caricature of Mr Edgar Lubbock (1847–1907). "The Master of the Blankney". Published in Vanity Fair in 1906

Personal information
- Born: 22 February 1847; St James's, London, England
- Died: 9 September 1907 (aged 60); Chelsea, London, England
- Batting: Right-handed
- Bowling: Left-arm fast
- Relatives: John Lubbock (father); John Lubbock (brother); Alfred Lubbock (brother); Nevile Lubbock (brother); Horace Peacock (brother-in-law); Basil Lubbock (nephew)

Domestic team information
- Years: Team
- 1866: I Zingari
- 1866: Gentlemen of Kent
- 1871: Kent
- FC debut: 8 August 1866 I Zingari v Gentlemen of the South
- Last FC: 10 August 1871 Kent v Gentlemen of the MCC

Career statistics
Competition	First-class
Matches	3
Runs scored	77
Batting average	15.40
100s/50s	0/1
Top score	54
Balls bowled	108
Wickets	1
Bowling average	27.00
5 wickets in innings	0
10 wickets in match	0
Best bowling	1/4
Catches/stumpings	1/–
- Source: CricInfo, 12 February 2011

Edgar Lubbock (22 February 1847 – 9 September 1907) was an English amateur footballer who twice won the FA Cup and played first-class cricket. He later became a partner in the Whitbread Brewery, a director and Deputy Governor of the Bank of England and the Master of the Blankney Foxhounds.

== Early life and education ==
Lubbock was born in London, the tenth of eleven children of Sir John Lubbock (1803–1865), the former head of the Lubbock & Co Bank, and Harriet Hotham,

He was educated at Eton College where he became a member of the football XI between 1864 and 1866, and captain in his final year. He was also part of the mixed Wall team between 1863 and 1865. In 1868, he went up to the University of London where he studied law, graduating with a second-class honours Bachelor of Laws (LLB) degree in 1874 and obtaining the Clifford's Inn prize for Law.

== Cricket career ==
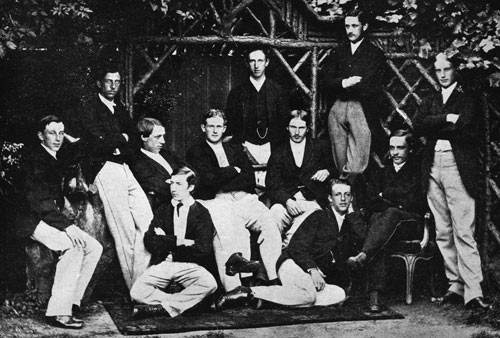
Eton College cricket XI of 1866. Lubbock is seated in the centre of the middle row

Lubbock was a member of the Eton College cricket XI from 1864 to 1866; after leaving college, he played for various teams including Marylebone Cricket Club, I Zingari and the Gentlemen of Kent. He was described as "a right-handed batsman with an awkward style, (who) bowled left underhand fast".

In August 1871, he played one match for Kent County Cricket Club against the Gentlemen of Marylebone Cricket Club. In this match his wicket was taken twice by W.G. Grace. Despite this, Lubbock was his side's top scorer with 54 in the second innings, although the "Gentlemen" won by an innings and 45 runs; His obituary in Wisden commented that it was "surprising that he never assisted the county again".

In 1872, he was a member of R.A. Fitzgerald's XI who visited North America playing nine matches in little over a month. Over the next few years, he turned out a few times a year, mainly for I Zingari until 1879, although he played one match for I Zingari in June 1891, in which he failed to score and claimed one wicket.

Several of his brothers also played cricket, including Alfred who was considered one of the best batsmen of the era but only made 28 first-class appearances and Nevile who made six first-class appearances. Both played matches for Kent as well as for a variety of other amateur sides.

== Football career ==
Lubbock was a member of the Eton College football XI, becoming captain in 1866. Whilst at college, he joined the Wanderers, making his debut on 22 December 1866 against Harrow Chequers. His appearances for Wanderers were infrequent over the next few years until 1869–70 when he played more regularly, normally in a half-back role.

In March 1870, Lubbock was invited by the Wanderers' captain, C.W. Alcock to take part in a match between "England" and "Scotland". This was the first of five "pseudo-internationals" which took place before the first officially recognised international in November 1872. The match report in "The Sporting Gazette" of Saturday 12 March 1870 said "For England. . . Messrs E. Freeth and E. Lubbock were also very effective as backs", while the "Glasgow Herald" said "among the English, A. Baker, E. Lubbock and E. Freeth were the most prominent". Lubbock was one of four players to appear in all five matches.

On 16 December 1871, he played for Wanderers in their opening match in the first season of the FA Cup. The match against Clapham Rovers was played on Clapham Common with Wanderers victorious by a 3–1 margin, in which Thomas Pelham, the son of the Earl of Chichester scored the opening goal. Despite only drawing against Crystal Palace and Queen's Park in the next two rounds, Wanderers reached the final of the tournament, where they met a team from the Royal Engineers. The final was played at the Kennington Oval on 16 March 1872 for which Lubbock was selected as one of only two defenders, with Wanderers playing with eight forwards. Despite being an "all-out attacking affair" the match was decided by a single goal, scored by Morton Betts (who played under the pseudonym, "A. H. Chequer"). The Wanderers thereby claimed the inaugural FA Cup and went on to win it five times in the first seven years. Their victory in 1872 was attributed to "the superior play of their backs".

Lubbock also played regularly for Old Etonians and in one match between Wanderers and the Old Boys, Lubbock came up against C.W. Alcock. Alcock "tried out a special charge of his own against "Quintus" Lubbock, one of the great half-backs of the day. 'By heaven! Alcock', cried out the towering Lubbock. 'If you do that again, I'll hack your legs off".

In 1874, the Old Etonians entered the FA Cup for the first time. They started their campaign against the Swifts, which proved a very tough match. After two drawn games, the Etonians managed to pull off a 3–0 victory. In the second round they received a bye which led them into the Quarter Finals. Following a win against Maidenhead, they played Shropshire Wanderers; in an extremely close match, the Old Boys came through by a single goal to nil. Thus, the Old Boys reached the FA Cup Final at their first attempt, where they came up against a strong team from the Royal Engineers who were in the final for the third time in the first four years of the competition. The final was played in a strong wind, which favoured the Old Etonians who had the wind at their backs for all but ten minutes of the 90, and all 30 minutes of extra time (teams in this period only changed ends after a goal was scored). The teams finished level after 90 minutes, with a goal from Capt Henry Renny-Tailyour being cancelled out by one from Alexander Bonsor.

The match was replayed three days later, with the Old Etonians being forced to make four changes; one of the replacements was Lubbock's elder brother, Alfred; they were the first brothers to appear for the same side in an FA Cup Final (William and Herbert Rawson had played for opposing teams in the previous year's final). As a result of playing a weakened team, the Old Etonians were easily dominated by the Engineers who emerged victorious by a 2–0 margin. According to the football historian Philip Gibbons, Edgar Lubbock and Arthur Kinnaird were the pick of the Old Boys, although the Engineers' victory was well deserved.

The following year, the Old Etonians again reached the final, where they met Lubbock's former team, the Wanderers. Lubbock was not available for the first match, which again ended in a 1–1 draw, but was available for the replay when he replaced James Welldon, who was later to become Bishop of Calcutta. Once again, the Old Boys failed in the replay, going down by a 3-goal margin.

After two years in which the Old Etonians failed to put up a team, they re-entered the FA Cup for the 1878–79 tournament. In the First Round, they were drawn against the cup holders, Wanderers, who had won the cup in five out of the seven years since the tournament was inaugurated. The Old Etonians won the match 7–2 in what, at the time, was considered a shock result. They went on to defeat Darwen, after two replays, and Nottingham Forest in the later stages, before reaching the final for the third time, against Clapham Rovers. After a goalless first-half, the only goal of the game came after 59 minutes, when Charles Clerke scored from close range following a run from Harry Goodhart. The old Etonians thus claimed the cup for the first time in what was considered to be "the poorest FA Cup Final to date".

In his 1875 "Football Annual", C.W. Alcock described Lubbock as "still unrivalled as a back, and no English Eleven can be complete without him; very accurate in his kicking". Despite this, Lubbock never played for England in an official international although he was selected for the match against Scotland on 6 March 1875 but withdrew because of injury.

Lubbock also played football for West Kent, Crusaders and Gitanos as well as representing Kent, London and Middlesex.

== Tennis career ==
Lubbock was also a successful lawn tennis player he won two titles including the Grand National Lawn Tennis Tournament at Hendon in 1879, and the South of England Championships at Eastbourne in 1881. He was also a finalist at the Prince's Club Championships at West Kensington in 1880, and a semi-finalist at the London Athletic Club Tournament (today's Queen Club Championships) in 1883. At the 1881 Wimbledon Championships the furthest he progressed was to the third round.

== Professional career ==
After graduating from the University of London, Lubbock embarked on a career in the law achieving high office, including being appointed Lieutenant of the City of London. He gained the reputation as an "extremely able business organiser" and became a director of the Whitbread Brewery in 1875 and of the Bank of England from 1891.

== Family ==
On 26 June 1886, Lubbock married Amy Myddelton Peacock of Greatford Hall, Stamford, Lincolnshire. They had three daughters:

- Nancy Induna Lubbock (17 September 1897 – 13 December 1972). She married James Knyvett Howard, son of Henry Howard, 18th Earl of Suffolk.
- Bridget Myfanwy Lubbock (11 November 1900 – 7 February 1966). She married Capt. George Barker and secondly, Louis Philippe de Carol de Moute, Baron de Moute.
- Marigold Rosemary Lubbock (15 May 1903 – 15 May 1976). She married Hugo William Cecil Denison, 4th Earl of Londesborough of Blankney Hall and secondly, Capt. Zygmunt de Lubicz-Bakanowski.

== Lincolnshire ==
Following his marriage, Lubbock moved to Lincolnshire, firstly living in Grantham. In 1903, the family moved to Caythorpe Court which Lubbock had had designed by Sir Reginald Blomfield. The house was built as a hunting lodge in the grounds of an old farm to the east of the village of Caythorpe.

He was a keen huntsman, and rode with both the Belvoir and Blankney Hunts, becoming Master of the Blankney in 1904. In 1906 he was appointed High Sheriff of Lincolnshire.

He died suddenly on 9 September 1907, aged 60. His funeral was held at St Vincent Church, Caythorpe.

== Football honours ==
Wanderers

- FA Cup winners: 1872

Old Etonians

- FA Cup winners: 1879
- FA Cup finalists: 1875, 1876
