= Percy Lubbock =

English essayist and biographer (1879–1965)

Percy Lubbock

Percy Lubbock, CBE (4 June 1879 – 1 August 1965) was an English man of letters, known as an essayist, critic and biographer. His controversial book The Craft of Fiction gained influence in the 1920s.

== Life ==
Percy Lubbock was the son of the merchant banker Frederic Lubbock (1844–1927) and his wife Catherine (1848–1934), daughter of John Gurney (1809–1856) of Earlham Hall, Norfolk, who was a member of an influential Norwich banking family. Earlham, Percy Lubbock's memoir of childhood summer holidays spent at his maternal grandfather's house, was to win him the James Tait Black Memorial Prize in 1922. His father, Frederic Lubbock, was also a banker, a son of Sir John Lubbock, 3rd Baronet, and a younger brother of John Lubbock, 1st Baron Avebury, brought up at Emmetts near Ide Hill in Kent. He was educated at Eton College and King's College, Cambridge. He later became a Fellow of Magdalene College, Cambridge, where he was Pepys Librarian.

Lubbock set up home at Gli Scafari, a villa on the Gulf of Spezia designed by Cecil Pinsent. Towards the end of his life he went blind and was read to by Quentin Crewe. Well-placed socially, his intellectual connections included his Cambridge contemporary E. M. Forster, Edith Wharton (he was a member of her Inner Circle from about 1906), Howard Sturgis and Bernard Berenson. Other Cambridge friends included the singer Clive Carey.

== Writing ==
Lubbock reviewed anonymously in the columns of The Times Literary Supplement some significant modern novels, including Forster's Howards End. His 1921 book The Craft of Fiction ("the official textbook of the Modernist aesthetics of indirection") became a straw man for writers including Forster, Virginia Woolf and Graham Greene, who disagreed with his rather formalist view of the novel. Wayne Booth in The Rhetoric of Fiction considers that Lubbock's take on the craft of Henry James was in fact schematizing and formal, if systematic, with a flattening effect. Nevertheless, Lubbock's The Craft of Fiction had a profound influence on novelists in the 1920s and after.

As Michaela Bronstein has noted, "Lubbock's book didn't just influence critics; it was also a spur to contemporary novelists. Virginia Woolf vacillated between echoing and condemning his ideas. Woolf's lengthiest engagement with Lubbock was her 1922 essay 'On Re-reading Novels,' which primarily praises and extends Lubbock's argument. However, in her Diary in October 15, 1923, she found herself disagreeing with him from an artistic perspective: his ideal aesthetic form, she says, cannot be accomplished consciously."

== Marriage ==
Lubbock was homosexual, but seeking a financially secure life, he made a marriage of convenience in 1926 to Sybil Scott, née Lady Sybil Marjorie Cuffe. This made him a stepfather to the writer Iris Origo. Sybil was a daughter of the Irish peer Hamilton John Agmondesham Cuffe, 5th Earl of Desart. She had been widowed in 1910 by the premature death of her first husband, William Bayard Cutting Jr., from tuberculosis. She then remarried – her second husband was Geoffrey Scott, another of the Berenson circle, but the couple divorced in 1926 and in the same year she took Lubbock as her third husband.

The marriage caused a division between Lubbock and Edith Wharton, who disapproved of Sybil.

== Henry James ==
Lubbock was a good friend of Henry James in James's later life and became a follower in literary terms, and his editor after his death. Later scholars have questioned the editorial decisions he made in publishing the James letters in 1920, at a time when many of those concerned were still alive. Mark Schorer, in his introduction to a reprint of Lubbock's The Craft of Fiction, described him as "more Jamesian than James".

== Works ==
- Elizabeth Barrett Browning in Her Letters (1906)
- Samuel Pepys (1909)
- A Book of English Prose, Part II (1913)
- The Letters of Henry James (1920) editor, two volumes
- George Calderon - a Sketch from Memory (1921)
- Earlham (1921) memoirs of Earlham Hall
- The Craft of Fiction (1921). ISBN 978-1599866086
- Roman Pictures (1923)
- The Region Cloud (1925)
- The Diary of Arthur Christopher Benson (1927)
- Mary Cholmondeley: A Sketch from Memory (1928)
- Shades of Eton (1929) memoirs
- Portrait of Edith Wharton (1947)
- Percy Lubbock Reader (1957) editor Marjory Gane Harkness
