= Nevile Lubbock =

English cricketer and President of the West India Committee

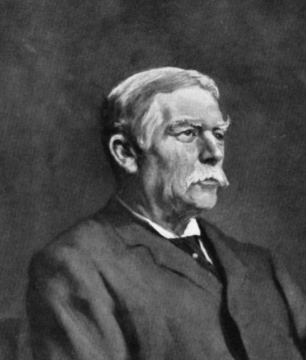
- Nevile Lubbock, 1903, painted by Hubert von Herkomer

Personal information
- Born: 31 March 1839; Pimlico, London
- Died: 12 September 1914 (aged 75); Oakley House, Bromley Common, Kent
- Batting: Right-handed
- Relatives: John Lubbock (father); John Lubbock (brother); Alfred Lubbock (brother); Edgar Lubbock (brother); Basil Lubbock (nephew)

Domestic team information
- Years: Team
- 1858–1860: Gentlemen of Kent
- 1860: Kent
- FC debut: 29 July 1858 Gentlemen of Kent v Gentlemen of England
- Last FC: 15 August 1860 Gentlemen of Kent v Gentlemen of the Marylebone Cricket Club (MCC)

Career statistics
Competition	First-class
Matches	6
Runs scored	135
Batting average	15.00
100s/50s	0/0
Top score	42
Catches/stumpings	2/–
- Source: CricInfo, 29 February 2024

Sir Nevile Lubbock KCMG (31 March 1839 – 12 September 1914) was President of the West India Committee and an English amateur cricketer.

Lubbock was born on 31 March 1839 in Pimlico, the third son of Sir John Lubbock and his wife Lady Harriet. He was educated at Eton College from the age of nine, leaving Eton when he was 15 to join his father's business in the City of London. In 1862 he joined the firm of Cavan Brothers and Company who were West India merchants, it started a lifetime of connection to the West Indies. He was a pioneer in the introduction of sugar cane-farming in Trinidad and in 1887 he was invited by the British Government to attend the first Colonial Conference. He was knighted in 1889 and became President of the West India Committee, a role he fulfilled from 1909 until 1914. He was a governor of the Royal Exchange Assurance Company and a company director.

Despite leaving Eton too young to have played in the cricket team, Lubbock played six first-class cricket matches between 1858 and 1860. He made his first-class debut in July 1858, playing for Gentlemen of Kent against Gentlemen of England at Lord's. As well as four appearances for Gentlemen of Kent, Lubbock played twice for Kent County Cricket Club in 1860. He played in minor games for Eton Ramblers and Gentlemen of West Kent and was described in his Wisden obituary as "a good steady batsman". Most of his brothers also played cricket, often for Gentlemen of West Kent, with two, Edgar and Alfred, also playing for Kent. His oldest brother, John, became the first Baron Avebury in 1900.

Lubbock was married twice, first to Charlotte Wood with whom he had seven sons and three daughters. After her death in 1878 he married Constance Herschel in 1880, having another son and six daughters. He died suddenly, aged 75, on 12 September 1914 at his home Oakley Park at Bromley Common in Kent.

== Bibliography ==
- Carlaw, Derek (2020). Kent County Cricketers, A to Z: Part One (1806–1914) (PDF). Cardiff: ACS.
