= Lubbock (disambiguation) =

Lubbock is a city in Texas.

Lubbock may also refer to:

- Lubbock (surname), includes a list of persons with the name
- Lubbock County, Texas
- Lubbock High School
- Lubbock metropolitan area
- Lubbock Cotton Kings, a minor-league ice hockey team
- Lubbock Renegades, an arena football team
- Lubbock (crater), a small lunar crater
- Lubbock (On Everything), a 1979 country music album by Terry Allen
- Lubbock, a character from Akame ga Kill!

== See also ==
- Lubbock Preston Smith International Airport
- Lubbock Christian University
- Lubbock Municipal Coliseum
- Lubbock Lake Landmark
- Lubbock tornado, a Fujita scale F5 tornado that occurred in the city on May 11, 1970
- Lubbock Lights
- Lubok, a Russian popular print
