= Alfred Lubbock =

English cricketer

Personal information
- Born: 31 October 1845; London, England
- Died: 17 July 1916 (aged 70); Par, Cornwall, England
- Batting: Right-handed
- Relatives: John Lubbock (father); John Lubbock (brother); Nevile Lubbock (brother); Edgar Lubbock (brother); Basil Lubbock (son)

Domestic team information
- Years: Team
- 1863–1875: Kent
- 1866–1869: Marylebone Cricket Club (MCC)
- FC debut: 10 August 1863 Kent v England
- Last FC: 19 July 1875 Kent v Derbyshire

Career statistics
Competition	First-class
Matches	28
Runs scored	1,043
Batting average	23.70
100s/50s	2/3
Top score	129
Balls bowled	252
Wickets	4
Bowling average	23.00
5 wickets in innings	0
10 wickets in match	0
Best bowling	2/62
Catches/stumpings	14/–
- Source: ESPNcricinfo, 27 December 2014

Alfred Lubbock (31 October 1845 – 17 July 1916) was an English insurance underwriter and banker. He is best known as an amateur cricketer who played in first-class matches for several teams, including Kent and Marylebone Cricket Club (MCC) between 1863 and 1875. He was considered to be one of the best batsmen of his time. He also played football for Old Etonians, and took part in the 1875 FA Cup Final.

== Early life ==
Lubbock was born in London in 1845, the seventh son of Sir John Lubbock. One of 15 children of Sir John and his wife Lady Harriet Lubbock, he was educated at Eton College. Lubbock was a fine sportsman, playing lawn tennis and excelling at the Eton wall game as well as playing cricket, captaining the school team in 1863. In his Wisden obituary Sydney Pardon argued that, given the relatively low scoring nature of cricket in the 1860s, Lubbock had a claim to have had one of the best season's batting for the school, including making a score of 174 not out against Winchester College in 1863.

== Cricket career ==
Lubbock made his first-class cricket debut for Kent during Canterbury Cricket Week in 1863, playing against England. He played a total of 28 first-class matches for a number of teams, including Gentlemen of Kent and MCC, until "practically giving up" first-class cricket before the age of 28 in 1871. He played eight times in Gentlemen v Players matches and scored two centuries, one for the Gentlemen and one, his highest score of 129, for an England XI in 1867. Pardon was of the opinion that if Test cricket had existed at the time Lubbock played that "he would have had every right to play for England" in his best seasons.

Lubbock appeared in only one county cricket match, his final first-class game at Catford in 1875 and ost of his cricket at this level was played during Canterbury Week or for the Gentlemen in more social environments. In club cricket, Lubbock played for Eton Ramblers, of which he was a founder with seven others in 1862, the Gentlemen of West Kent, Band of Brothers, and I Zingari. He scored "hundreds of runs", including a score of 200 against Royal Engineers in 1866 but chose to play relatively little first-class cricket. Pardon believed him to have been "one of the greatest batsmen" of his era who had "threatened to be W. G. Grace's most formidable rival".

== Football ==
Lubbock also played football and appeared for Old Etonians in the replay of the 1875 FA Cup Final against the Royal Engineers, one of the dominant teams of the day. The first match had finished 1–1, but several Old Etonians were unable to play in the replay at The Oval and Lubbock was called in as a replacement. He finished on the losing team, Royal Engineers winning 2–0.

== Athletics ==
Lubbock was a keen athlete and participated in various events, including the early days of the pole vault (known as the pole jump at the time). He finished third in the pole vault event at the 1868 AAC Championships.

== Family and later life ==
Two of Lubbock's brothers, Nevile and Edgar also played some first-class cricket for Kent and most of his brothers played cricket for the Gentlemen of West Kent at some point. Edgar played in the 1875 FA Cup Final replay alongside Alfred for Old Etonians, the first time that two brothers had appeared for the same team in an FA Cup Final. His oldest brother, John, became the first Baron Avebury in 1900.

Lubbock worked as an underwriter for Lloyd's of London and was a director of Robarts, Lubbock & Co, a private bank established in 1772 and owned by his family. He married Louisa Wallwroth in 1875. The couple had five children, including the author Basil Lubbock. He died at Killmarth Manor at Par, Cornwall in 1916 aged 70.

== Reminiscences ==
Lubbock's snobbish and anti-intellectual book Memories of Eton and Etonians: Including My Life at Eton, 1854-1863, and Some Reminiscences of Subsequent Cricket, 1864-1874, was notable for the uncommonly scathing reviews it received upon publication. The Spectator termed it 'squalid', writing: "these long-winded and uninteresting reminiscences...[are] out of date: it represents the most commonplace view of a somewhat barbarous period of Eton life." The Saturday Review termed it 'depressing' and 'illiterate', saying: "The book in fact reads like the table talk of an egoistic man of limited intellect, whose mental development was arrested at an early age."

== Bibliography ==
- Carlaw, Derek (2020). Kent County Cricketers, A to Z: Part One (1806–1914) (PDF). Cardiff: ACS.
