= Blankney Hunt =

English foxhound pack

- Founded: 1871
- Type of hunt: Foxhound
- Master: Mastership Committee
- Huntsman: (2004) P. Stubbings
- Whippers-in: (2010) B. Higgins
- Based in: Blankney, Lincolnshire
- Country: 20 x 11 miles
- Main Centres: Newark-on-Trent, Sleaford, Lincoln, Leadenham
- Website: http://www.blankneyhunt.co.uk
- Predecessing hunts: Burton Hunt

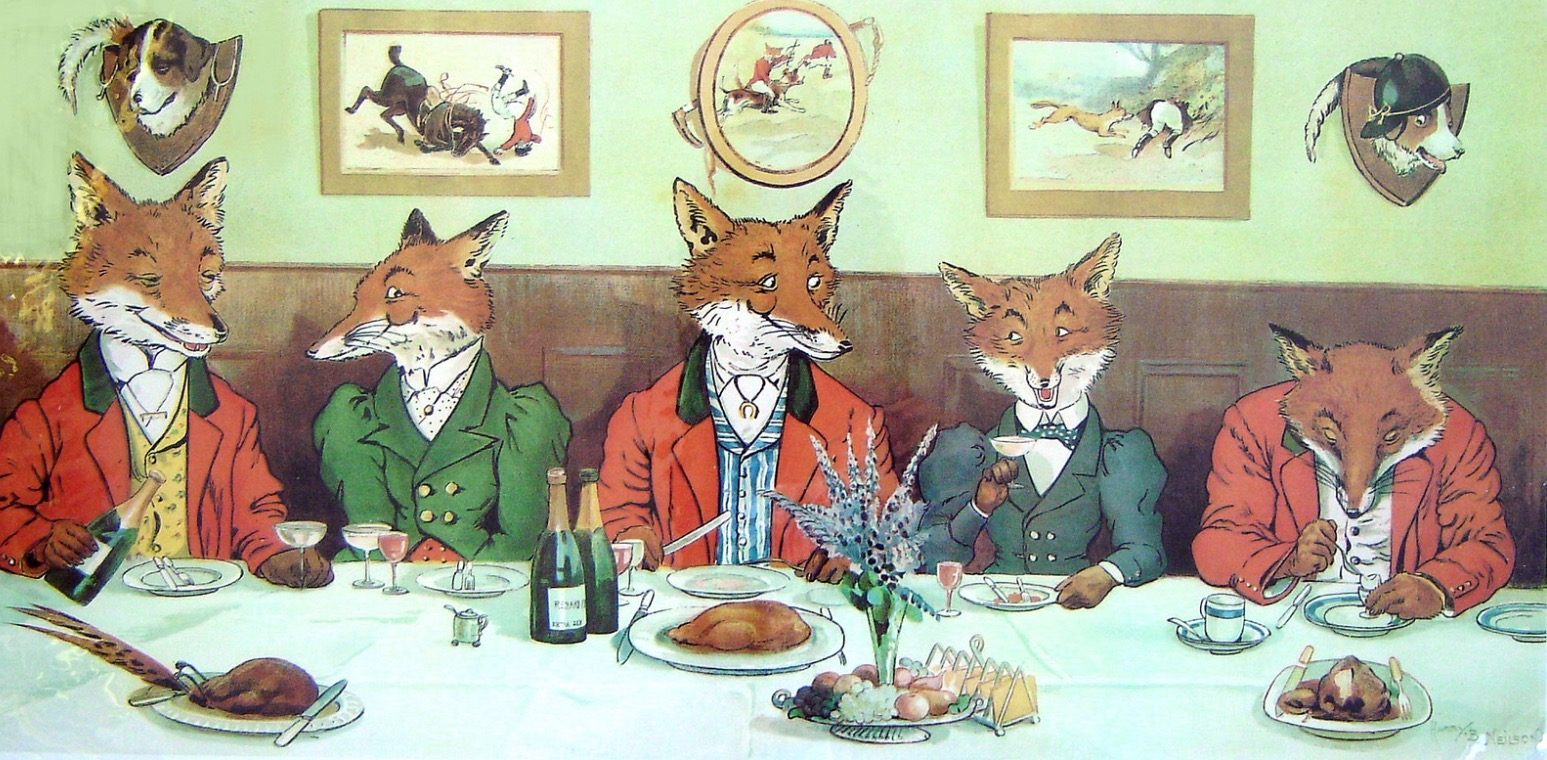
Mr Fox's Hunt Breakfast on Xmas Day (1900) by Harry B. Neilson, is said to represent members of the Blankney

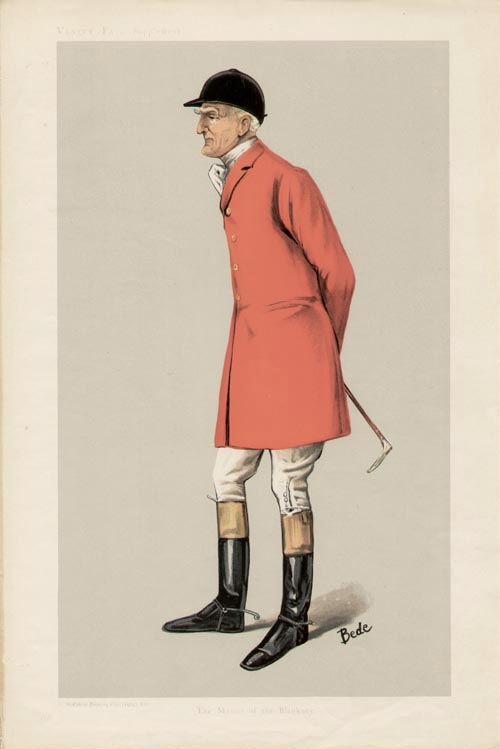
Caricature of Mr Edgar Lubbock (1847–1907). "The Master of the Blankney". Published in Vanity Fair in 1906.

The Blankney Hunt is an English foxhound pack, based in the village of Blankney, Lincolnshire, with hunting country of around 20 miles (32 km) by 11 miles (18 km) within Lincolnshire and Nottinghamshire.

== History and masters ==
The hunt dates from 1871, when the old Burton Hunt was divided; the "country" as now constituted has existed since the end of the nineteenth century.

The hounds were owned by a Mr. Cockburn from 1896, before being sold to Edgar Lubbock in 1904. Lubbock (1847–1907) was a lawyer who moved to nearby Caythorpe following his marriage in 1886 and after riding with both the Belvoir and Blankney Hunts, became Master of the Blankney in 1904. Following Lubbock's death, the hounds were sold to Lord Charles Bentinck who sold them on to Sir Robert Filmer in 1909. Vernon Willey, 2nd Baron Barnby (1884–1982), soldier and politician, was Master of the hunt in 1919 and 1933.

== Description of country ==
The country covers the Lincoln Heath and is mainly arable country with stone walls and hedges. The country borders on the Belvoir Hunt to the east and the Burton Hunt to the north.

== Related activities ==
The Blankney Hunt branch of the Pony Club was established in 1938.

There is an annual Point-to-point meeting associated with the hunt.

The hunt has given its name to a Hunt class destroyer, Blankney and to a LNER Class D49 locomotive, No.247 The Blankney.
