= Sir John Lubbock, 3rd Baronet =

English banker, barrister, mathematician and astronomer

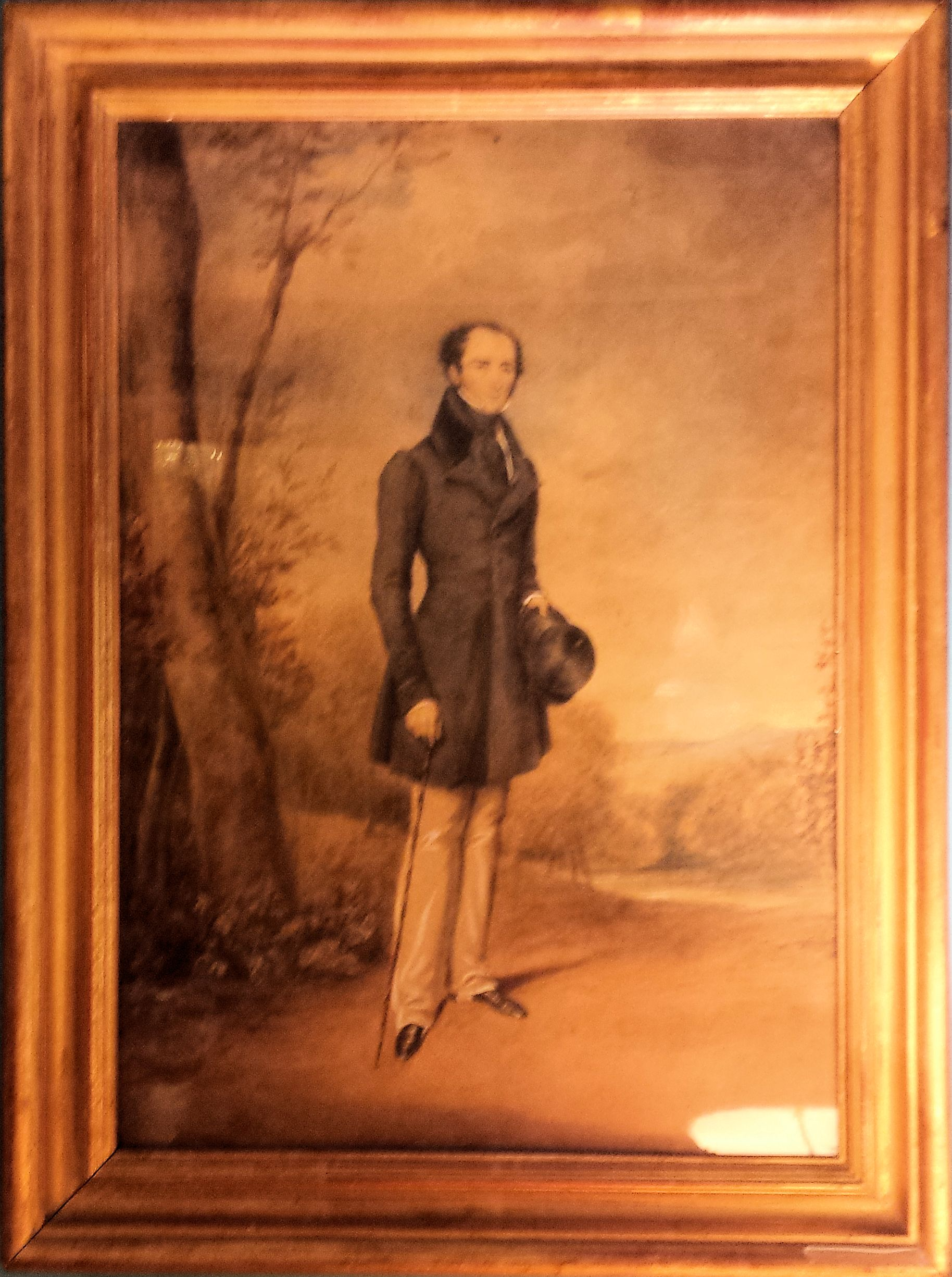
John William Lubbock, 3rd Baronet ca 1843

Sir John William Lubbock, 3rd Baronet, FRS (26 March 1803 – 21 June 1865), was an English banker, barrister, mathematician and astronomer.

== Life ==
He was born in Westminster, the son of Sir John William Lubbock, of the Lubbock & Co bank. He was educated at Eton and Trinity College, Cambridge, graduating in 1825. In the same year he became a partner in his father's bank.

In 1828, he became a fellow of the Royal Astronomical Society; in 1829, a fellow of the Royal Society, and has been described as "foremost among English mathematicians in adopting Laplace's doctrine of probability." He joined the Society for the Diffusion of Useful Knowledge in 1829, and was twice Treasurer (1830–1835, 1838–1845) and three times Vice-President (1830–1835, 1836–1837, 1838–1846) of the Royal Society.

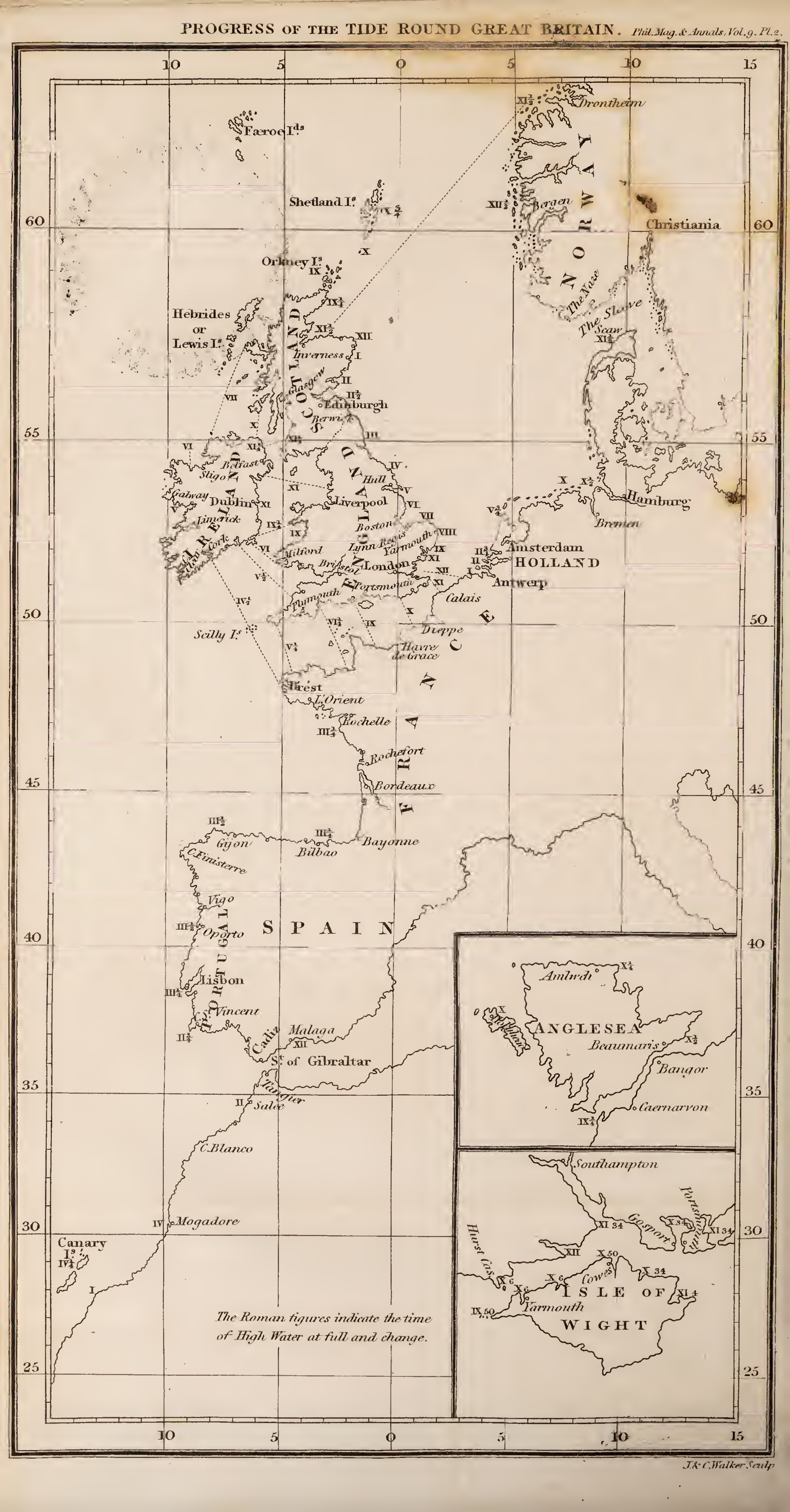
1831 map of the tides around Great Britain showing cotidal lines

Lubbock carried out important studies of the tides in the 1830s. He was one of the first to present maps showing lines joining points where high tide occurred at the same time, and coined the term cotidal lines for them. For these studies he was awarded the Royal Medal in 1834.

Lubbock was the first Vice-Chancellor of the University of London (1837–1842), a position later held by his eldest son, Sir John Lubbock, 4th Bt, who was later created Baron Avebury in 1900. He was appointed Sheriff of Kent for 1852.

Lubbock became head of Lubbock & Co, retired mostly in 1840, but oversaw the merger that created Robarts, Lubbock & Co in 1860.

== High Elms ==
He largely rebuilt the family home of High Elms, near Downe village in Kent. His property was on the other side of the village to the land belonging to Down House, and when Charles Darwin and Emma Darwin were house-hunting in 1842, Darwin told his sister all about Down House, noting that Lubbock was the owner of 3,000 acres (12 km^{2}) and was building a grand house nearby. Darwin said: "I believe he is very reserved & shy & proud or fine—so I suspect he will be no catch, & will never honour us". When word reached Sir John William Lubbock, he went home and hinted at a great piece of news without immediately disclosing what it was. His son, John, wondered whether the news might be the announcement of a pony of his own, and was disappointed at first to learn that it was merely the news that Charles Darwin would soon be living at Down House. The families were on friendly terms, and young John Lubbock frequently visited Down House, becoming a close friend of Darwin's. In 1846, Lubbock rented land near Down House to Darwin, who had it planted as woodland and laid out with the Sandwalk which became Darwin's daily walk.

== Family ==
He married Harriet Hotham in 1833, and they had eleven children.

Their eldest son John was a scientist and banker, later ennobled as Baron Avebury.

Their youngest child, Edgar, won the FA Cup with Wanderers in 1872 and with Old Etonians in 1879. He was also a cricketer with Kent County Cricket Club.

Another son, Alfred, played for Old Etonians in the 1875 FA Cup Final and was a Kent county cricketer, as was a third son, Nevile. A grandson was the author Basil Lubbock.

His grand-daughter Violet Catherine, only daughter of his son Frederick Lubbock, of Emmetts, Kent, married Charles Pym, who after her death in 1927 was Chairman of Kent County Council.

Baronetage of the United Kingdom
Preceded by John Lubbock	Baronet of Lamas; 1840–1865	Succeeded by John Lubbock
Academic offices
New post	Vice-Chancellor of the University of London; 1836–1842	Succeeded by Sir John Shaw Lefevre
