= John Lubbock, 1st Baron Avebury =

English banker and politician (1834–1913)

The Right Honourable The Lord Avebury Bt PC DL FRS FRAI
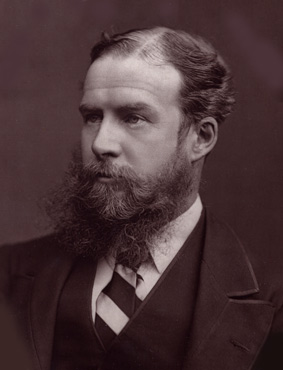
- Woodburytype print of Lord Avebury in middle age

Member of the House of Lords
- Lord Temporal
- In office 22 January 1900 – 28 May 1913
- Preceded by: Peerage created
- Succeeded by: John Lubbock

Chairman of the London County Council
- In office 1890–1892
- Preceded by: The Earl of Rosebery
- Succeeded by: The Earl of Rosebery

Member of Parliament for London University
- In office 1880–1900
- Preceded by: Robert Lowe
- Succeeded by: Michael Foster

Member of Parliament for Maidstone
- In office 1870–1880
- Preceded by: William Lee
- Succeeded by: Alexander Henry Ross

Personal details
- Born: 30 April 1834 London, England
- Died: 28 May 1913 (aged 79) Broadstairs, Kent, England
- Party: Liberal (until 1886); Liberal Unionist (since 1886)
- Other political affiliations: Progressive Party (County of London, 1889–1890)
- Known for: Bank holidays and the Ancient Monuments Protection Act 1882

John Lubbock, 1st Baron Avebury (30 April 1834 – 28 May 1913), known as Sir John Lubbock, 4th Baronet, from 1865 until 1900, was an English banker, Liberal politician, philanthropist, scientist and polymath. Lubbock worked in his family company as a banker but made significant contributions in archaeology, ethnography, and several branches of biology. He coined the terms "Palaeolithic" and "Neolithic" to denote the Old and New Stone Ages, respectively. He helped establish archaeology as a scientific discipline, and was influential in debates concerning evolutionary theory. He introduced the first law for the protection of the UK's archaeological and architectural heritage. He promoted the establishment of public libraries and was also a founding member of the X Club. Bank holidays were also introduced to the UK from 1871 thanks to an Act of Parliament that he promoted.

== Early life ==
John Lubbock was born in 1834, the son of Sir John Lubbock, 3rd Baronet, a London banker, and his wife Harriet. In 1840, his grandfather died and his father inherited the family wealth, title, 3000 acres including a 668 acre estate between Farnborough and Down. He was brought up in the family home of High Elms Estate, near Downe in Kent. The family had two homes, one at 29 Eaton Place, Belgrave Square where John was born, and another in Mitcham Grove. Lubbock senior had studied mathematics at Cambridge University and had written on probability, and on astronomy. A Fellow of the Royal Society, he was keenly involved in the scientific debates of the time, as well as serving as the Vice Chancellor of London University. During 1842, his father brought home a "great piece of news": the young Lubbock said later that he initially thought that the news might be of a new pony, and was disappointed to learn it was only that Charles Darwin was moving to Down House in the village. The youth was soon a frequent visitor to Down House, and became the closest of Darwin's younger friends. Their relationship stimulated young Lubbock's passion for science and evolutionary theory. John's mother, Harriet née Hotham, was deeply religious.

In 1843 he went to a preparatory school and, in 1845, Lubbock began studies at Eton College. He left Eton due to poor health in 1848 and Darwin suggested to Lubbock senior that he gift his son a microscope for his 14th birthday. In 1849 he joined the Royal Institution and attended lectures during the winter sessions from 1849 to 1851. He also attended Friday lectures and set himself a personal reading plan. After finishing school, he was employed by his father's bank, Lubbock & Co. (which later amalgamated with Coutts & Co.), of which he became a partner at the age of 22. Around 1852, he assisted Darwin's research by examining and illustrating barnacles. In 1865, he succeeded to the baronetcy.

== Business and politics ==
In the early 1870s, Lubbock became increasingly interested in politics. In 1870, and again in 1874, he was elected as a Liberal Party Member of Parliament (MP) for Maidstone. He lost the seat at the election of 1880, but was at once elected member for London University, of which he had been vice-chancellor since 1872. As an MP, Lubbock had a distinguished political career, with four main political agendas: promotion of the study of science in primary and secondary schools; the national debt, free trade, and related economic issues; protection of ancient monuments; securing of additional holidays and shorter working hours for the working classes. He was successful with numerous enactments in Parliament, including the Bank Holidays Act 1871 and the Ancient Monuments Act 1882, along with another 28 acts of Parliament. When the Liberals split in 1886 on the issue of Irish Home Rule, Lubbock joined the breakaway Liberal Unionist Party in opposition to Irish home rule. A prominent supporter of the Statistical Society, he took an active part in criticising the encroachment of municipal trading and the increase of the municipal debt.

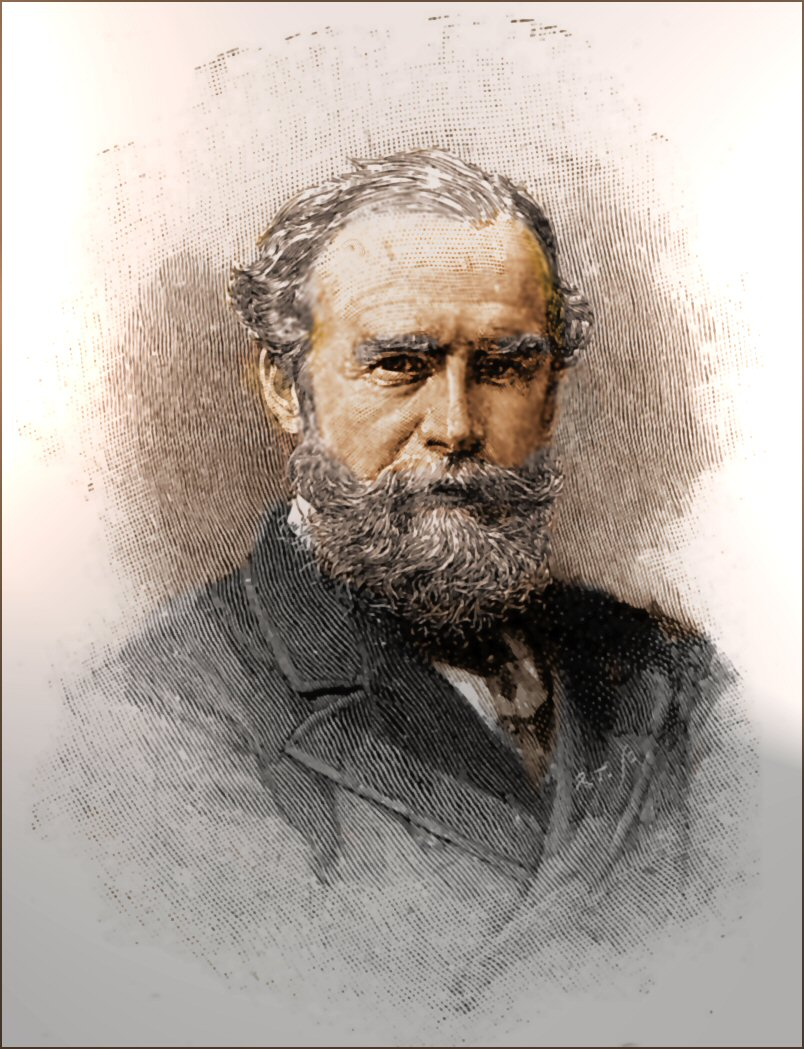
Lubbock portrayed in Strand Magazine, 1891

Lubbock's thoughts about the nature and value of politics were deeply influenced by his scientific research, particularly his writings on early human society. He believed that the cognitive foundations of morality could be shaped through political economy, particularly through a national education system that implemented subjects mandated by the state. He held that the minds of children could be shaped in the direction of democracy, liberalism and morality through learning how to read and write. To this goal he was a strong supporter of the Elementary Education Act 1870 and he defended the introduction of the national curriculum during the 1870s and 1880s.

In 1879, Lubbock was elected the first president of the Institute of Bankers. In 1881, he was president of the British Association, and from 1881 to 1886, president of the Linnean Society of London. In March 1883, he founded the Bank Clerks Orphanage, which in 1986 became the Bankers' Benevolent Fund – a charity for bank employees, past and present, and their dependants.

In January 1884, he helped found the Proportional Representation League, later to become the Electoral Reform Society. He authored the pamphlet Proportional Representation shortly after the founding of this organisation. He is credited with the now-common use of multi-member districts instead of country-wide districting proposed by Thomas Hare in his 1859 single transferable voting (STV) proposal.

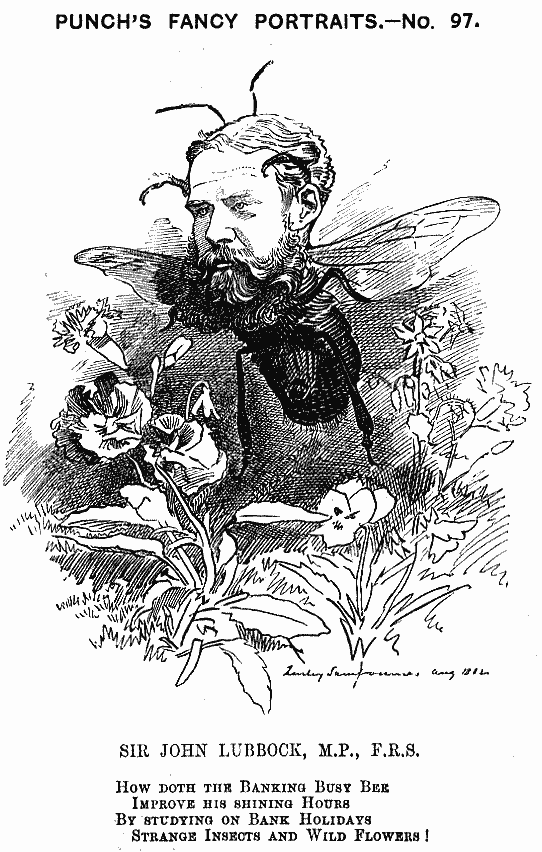
Caricature from Punch, 1882

In recognition of his contributions to the sciences, Lubbock received honorary degrees from the universities of Oxford, Cambridge (where he was Rede lecturer in 1886), Edinburgh, Dublin and Würzburg; and was appointed a trustee of the British Museum in 1878. He received the German Order Pour le Mérite for Science and Arts in August 1902.

From 1888 to 1892, he was president of the London Chamber of Commerce, and he was later President of the Association of Chambers of Commerce of the United Kingdom. In local politics, he was from 1889 to 1890 vice-chairman and from 1890 to 1892 chairman of the London County Council. In February 1890 he was appointed a privy councillor; and was chairman of the committee of design for the new coinage in 1891. On 22 January 1900, he was raised to the peerage as Baron Avebury, of Avebury, in the county of Wiltshire, his title commemorating the largest Stone Age site in Britain, which he had helped to preserve. He was President of the Royal Statistical Society from 1900 to 1902.

In November 1905, together with Lord Courtney of Penwith, he founded the Anglo-German Friendship Committee which sought to counteract the influence of the British war party, whose anti-German propaganda was then at its zenith, and smooth the way towards more amicable relations between England and Germany.

Lubbock was a proponent of easy access for all to books and was deeply involved in the passing of the Public Libraries Act, 1892. The quotation, "We may sit in our library and yet be in all quarters of the earth", is often attributed to Lubbock. This variation appears in his book The Pleasures of Life.

== Entomology, archaeology, anthropology, and evolutionary biology ==
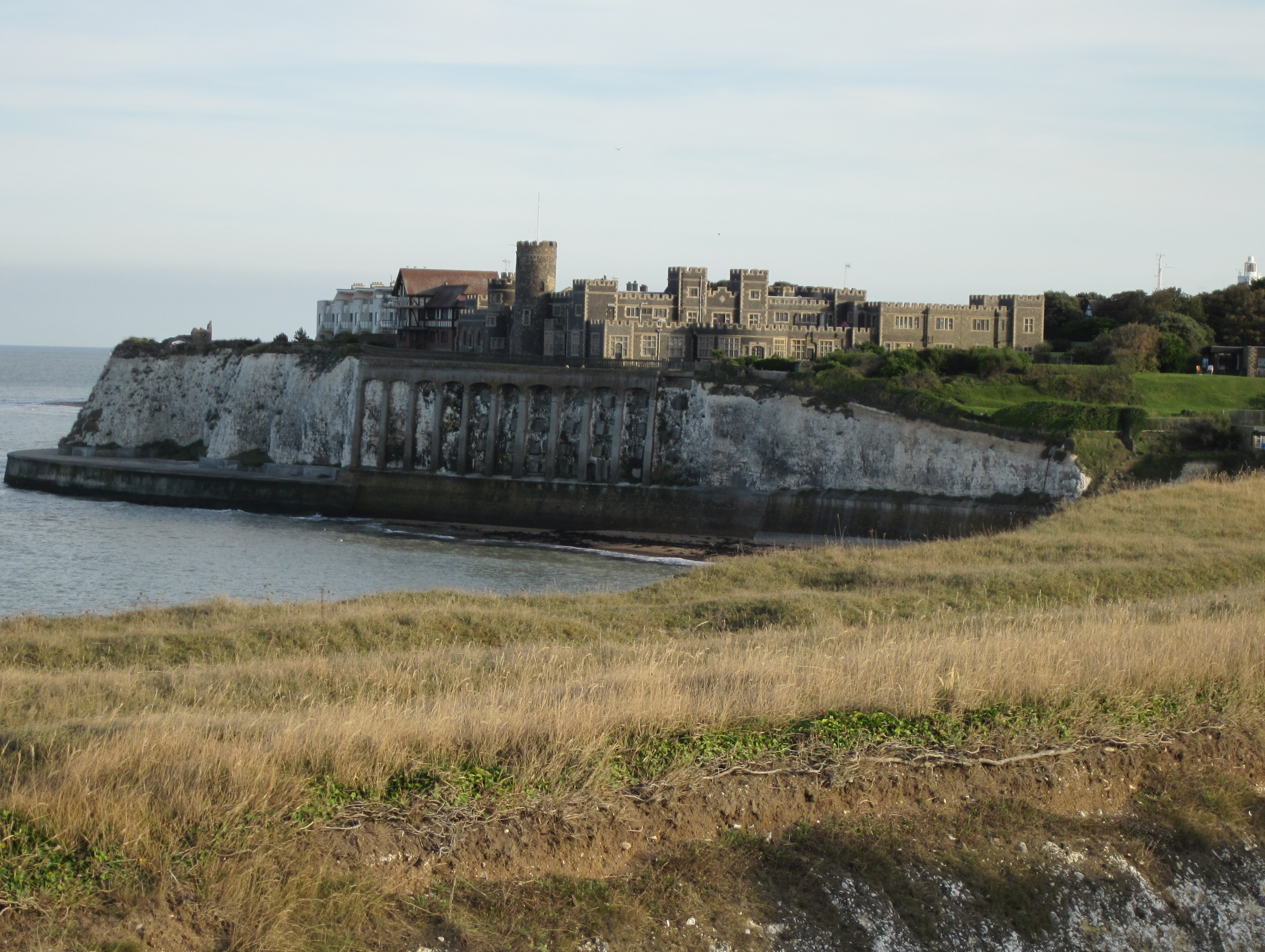
Kingsgate Castle in Kent was rebuilt by Lord Avebury. He sought legal protection for heritage buildings.

In addition to his work at his father's bank, Lubbock took a keen interest in biology, archaeology and evolutionary theory. Darwin had put him in touch with the American entomologist James Dwight Dana who led Lubbock to join the entomological society in 1851 and also guided him on the dissection of specimens. Lubbock also taught himself illustration and lithography. His first scientific paper, the description of a new copepod which he named as Labidocera darwinii, was published in 1853. In 1855, he and Charles Kingsley discovered the skull of a musk ox in a gravel pit, a discovery that was commended by Darwin. A collection of Iron Age antiquities Lubbock and Sir John Evans excavated at the site of Hallstatt in Austria is now in the British Museum's collection. He spoke in support of the evolutionist Thomas Henry Huxley at the famous 1860 Oxford evolution debate. During the 1860s, he published many articles in which he used archaeological evidence to support Darwin's theory. In 1864, he became one of the founding members (along with Thomas Henry Huxley and others) of the elite X Club, a dining club composed of nine gentlemen to promote the theories of natural selection and academic liberalism. He held a number of influential academic positions, including President of the Ethnological Society from 1864 to 1865, vice-president of Linnean Society in 1865, and President of the International Congress of Prehistoric Archaeology in 1868. In 1865 he published Pre-Historic Times, which became a standard archaeology textbook for the remainder of the century, with the seventh and final edition published in 1913.

His second book, On the Origin of Civilization, was published in 1870. He held the position of President of the Anthropological Institute of Great Britain and Ireland from 1871 to 1872, as well as the position of Vice President of the Royal Society in 1871. During this period he worked with John Evans, the other key figure in the establishment of the discipline of archaeology. He invented the terms "Palaeolithic" and "Neolithic" to denote the Old and New Stone Ages, respectively. He also introduced a Darwinian-type theory of human nature and development. "What was new was Lubbock's ... insistence that, as a result of natural selection, human groups had become different from each other, not only culturally, but also in their biological capacities to utilize culture."

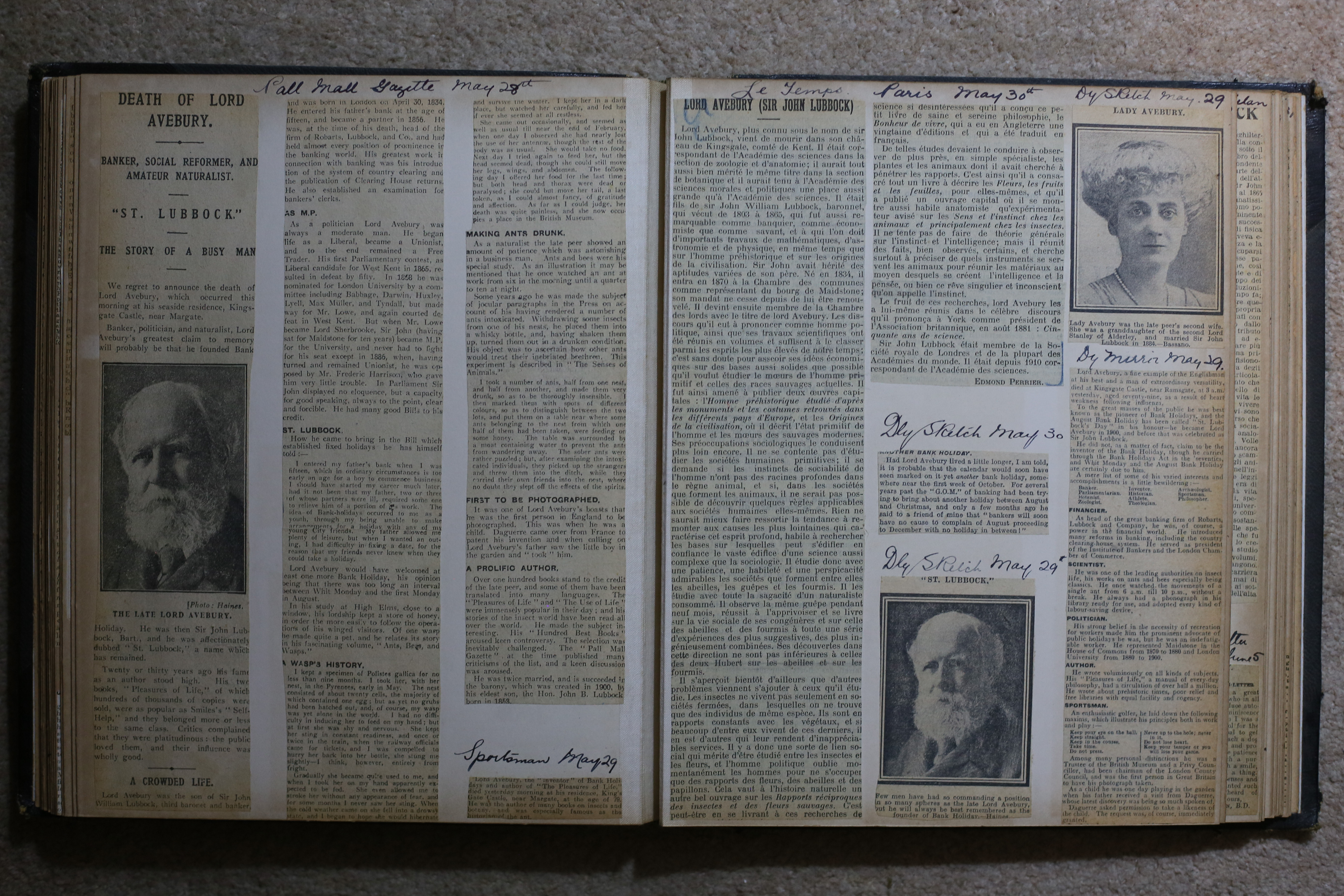
Pages from a book of obituary cuttings following the death of Sir John Lubbock in 1913

Lubbock complained in the preface to Pre-Historic Times about Charles Lyell:

Note.—In his celebrated work on the Antiquity of Man, he coined the term Neolithic in 1865. Sir Charles Lyell has made much use of my earlier articles in the Natural History Review, frequently, indeed, extracting whole sentences verbatim, or nearly so. But as he has in these cases omitted to mention the source from which his quotations were derived, my readers might naturally think that I had taken very unjustifiable liberties with the work of the eminent geologist. A reference to the respective dates will, however, protect me from any such inference. The statement made by Sir Charles Lyell, in a note to page 11 of his work, that my article on the Danish Shell-mounds was published after his sheets were written, is an inadvertence, regretted, I have reason to believe, as much by its author as it is by me."

In the 1870s, he bought land at Avebury to prevent part of the ancient stone circle from being built on. This, and other threats to the nation's heritage, persuaded him that some legal protection was needed. In 1874, he introduced a parliamentary bill that would identify a list of ancient sites that deserved legal protection. After several later attempts and against some opposition, it was not until 1882 that a much watered down version, The Ancient Monuments Act, came into being. Though restricted to 68 largely prehistoric monuments, it was the forerunner of all later laws governing the UK's archaeological and architectural heritage.

Lubbock was also an amateur biologist of some distinction, writing books on hymenoptera (Ants, Bees and Wasps: a record of observations on the habits of the social hymenoptera. Kegan Paul, London; New York: Appleton, 1884), on insect sense organs and development, on the intelligence of animals, the first monograph on UK Springtails (Collembola) (Monograph on the Collembola and Thysanura, Ray Society, London), and on other natural history topics. In 1871 he suggested a scheme of the evolution of insects. He established the arthropod order Collembola for the springtails. He discovered that ants were sensitive to light in the near ultraviolet range of the electromagnetic spectrum. He also noted that ants used the angle of the sun for orientation. In 1874 he became the first President of the British Beekeepers Association. A verse in Punch in 1882 described his activities:

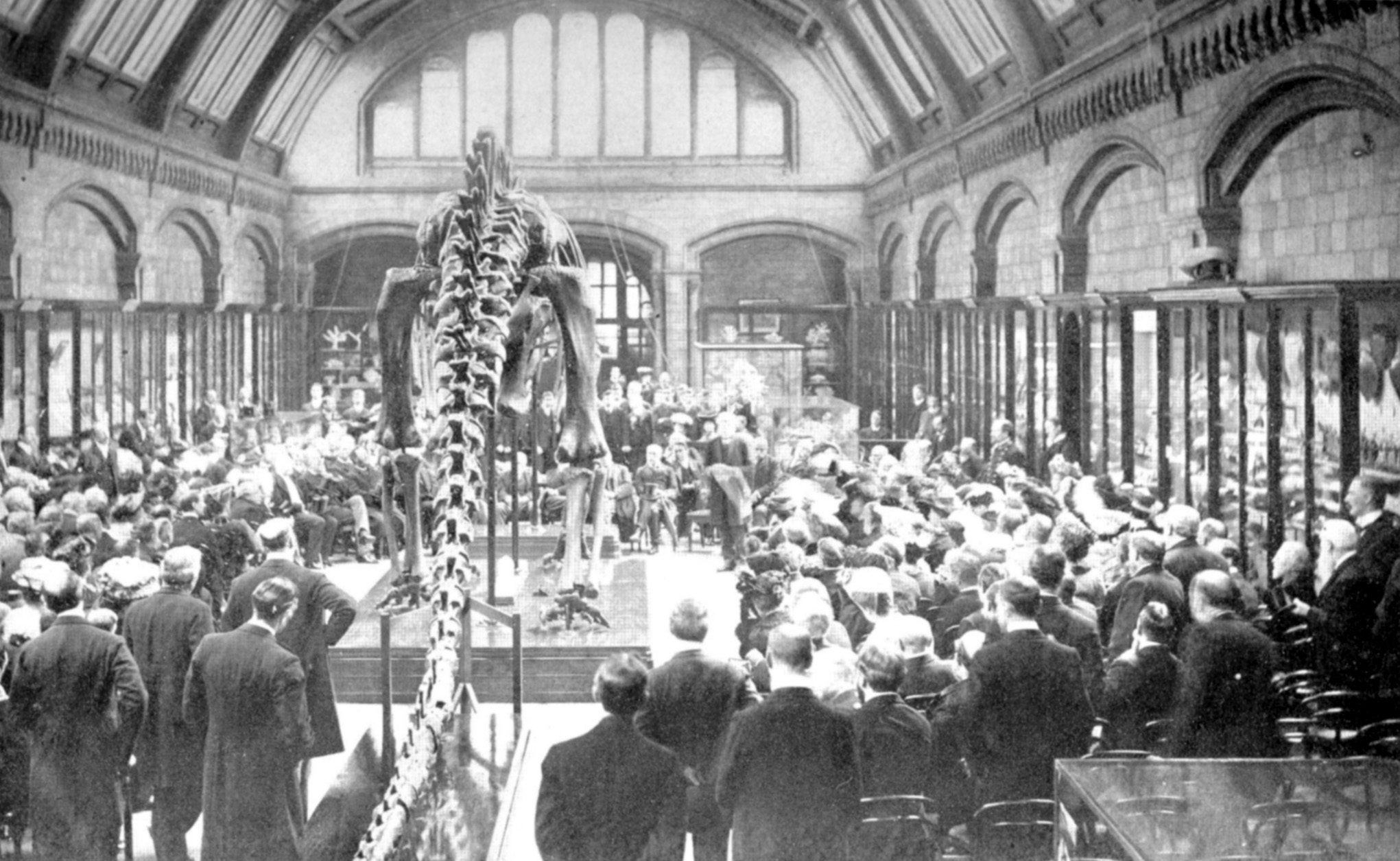
Lord Avebury speaking during the presentation of the first replica of Diplodocus carnegii to the trustees of the British Museum of Natural History, 12 May 1905

How doth the Banking Busy Bee,
Improve his shining Hours?
By studying on Bank Holidays,
Strange insects and Wild Flowers

He corresponded extensively with Charles Darwin, who lived nearby at Down House. Lubbock stayed in Downe except for a brief period from 1861 to 1865, when he lived in Chislehurst. Both men were active advocates of English spelling reform, and members of the Spelling Reform Association, precursor to the Simplified Spelling Society. Darwin rented land, originally from Lubbock's father, in Sandwalk wood where he performed his daily exercise, and in 1874 agreed with Lubbock to exchange the land for a piece of pasture in Darwin's property. When Darwin died in 1882, Lubbock suggested the honour of burial in Westminster Abbey, organising a letter to the dean to arrange this, and was one of the pallbearers.

In May 1884, an article appeared in Scientific American describing experiments by Lubbock in the field of human-animal communication.

In 1884, he was elected as a member to the American Philosophical Society, in 1889, as an honorary member of the Manchester Literary and Philosophical Society, and in 1893, a member of the American Antiquarian Society.

He received the 1903 Prestwich Medal from the Geological Society of London.

== Family ==
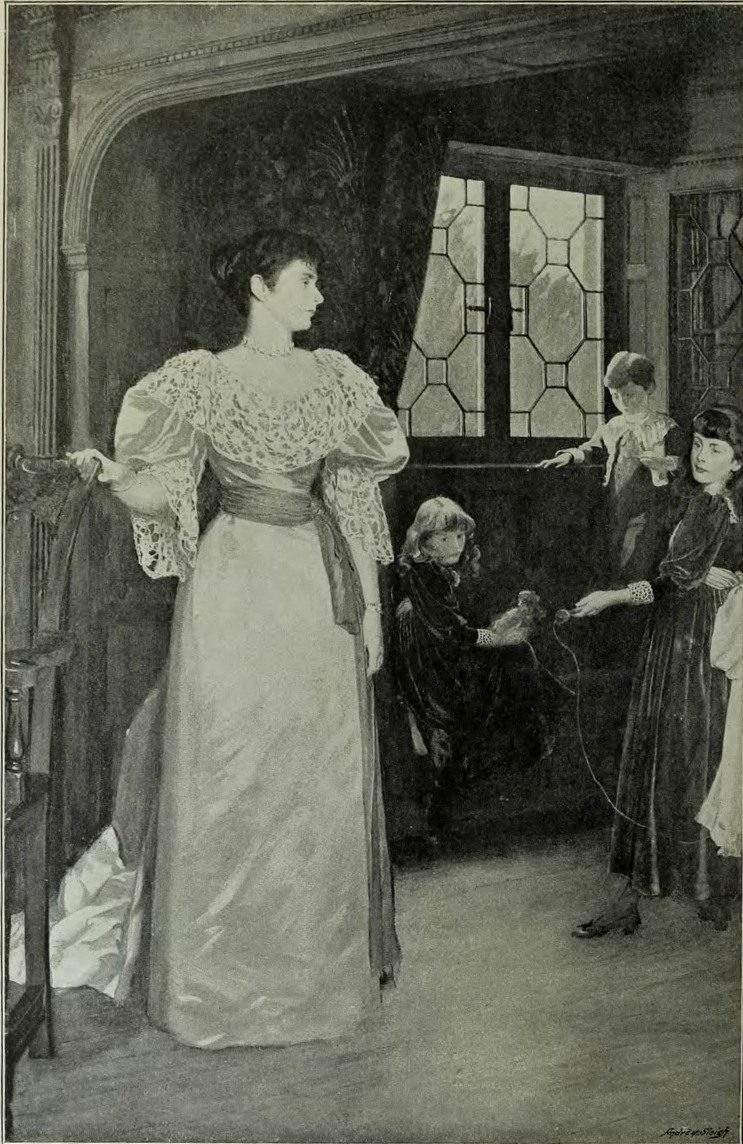
Alice, Lady Lubbock, and her three eldest children, portrait by Frederick Samuel Beaumont

Lubbock was one of eight brothers and three sisters; three brothers, Alfred, Nevile and Edgar, played first-class cricket for Kent. Edgar and Alfred also played football and played together for Old Etonians in the 1875 FA Cup Final. His nephew, Percy Lubbock, was a prominent man of letters and another nephew was the writer and historian Basil Lubbock.

Lubbock married Ellen Frances Horden in April 1856. Five years after her death, on 17 May 1884 he married Alice Lane Fox, the daughter of Augustus Pitt Rivers. He rebuilt Kingsgate Castle, near Broadstairs in Kent, as his family home, where he died in 1913. He was succeeded by his eldest son, John.

He was buried in St Giles the Abbott Church, in Farnborough, Kent. Three years later, his remains were disinterred and placed in a family burial ground a few hundred yards from the church, along with the original stone Celtic cross marking his grave. In 1986, Bromley Council, unknown to the Lubbock family, moved the cross back to the main church graveyard.

== Books ==
The following is a list of publications by Sir John Lubbock, arranged in chronological order by the dates of the first editions of each work.

- Lubbock J. (1865) Pre-Historic Times, As Illustrated by Ancient Remains, and the Manners and Customs of Modern Savages, Williams & Norgate, London
- Lubbock J. (1870) The Origin of Civilisation and the Primitive Condition of Man, Longmans, Green & Co., London
- Lubbock J. (1871) Monograph on the Collembola and Thysanura, Ray Society, London
- Lubbock J. (1872) the Origin and the Metamorphoses of Insects On the Origin and the Metamorphoses of Insects, Macmillan & Co., London
- Lubbock J. (1873) On British Wild Flowers Considered in relation to Insects, Macmillan & Co., London
- Lubbock J. (1874) Scientific Lectures, Macmillan & Co., London
- Lubbock J. (1877) "Ant Intelligence", Scientific American article, 31 March 1877, p. 198-199
- Lubbock J. (1879) Addresses, Political and Educational, Macmillan & Co., London
- Lubbock J. (1881) Fifty Years of Science, Being the Address Delivered at York to the British Association, August 1881, Macmillan & Co., London
- Lubbock J. (1882) Ants, Bees and Wasps: A Record of Observations on the Habits of the Social Hymenoptera, Keegan Paul, Trench, Trübner, & Co. Ltd., London: 442 pp.
- Lubbock J. (1882) Chapters in Popular Natural History, National Society, London
- Lubbock J. (1882) Flowers, Fruits and Leaves, Macmillan & Co., London
- Lubbock J. (1883) On the Senses, Instincts and Intelligence of Animals, With Special Reference to Insects, Keegan Paul, Trench, Trübner, & Co. Ltd., London: 512 pp.
- Lubbock J. (1885) Representation, Swan Sonnenschein & Co., Berne
- Lubbock J. (1887–89) The pleasures of life, (2 volumes) Macmillan & Co., London
- Lubbock J. (1889) La Vie des Plantes, Hachette Livre
- Lubbock J. (1890) Flowers and Insects, Macmillan & Co., London (Included in later compilations)
- Lubbock J. (1892) The Beauties of Nature, Macmillan & Co., London
- Lubbock J. (1894) The Use of Life, Macmillan & Co., London
- Lubbock J. (1896) The Duty of Happiness, H. Altemus,
- Lubbock J. (1896) The Scenery of Switzerland, Macmillan & Co., London
- Lubbock J. (1898) On Buds and Stipules, Keegan Paul, Trench, Trübner, & Co. Ltd., London: 239 pp.
- Lubbock J. (1902) The Scenery of England, Macmillan & Co., London
- Lubbock J. (1902) A Short History of Coins and Currency, John Murray
- Lubbock J. (1904) Free Trade, Macmillan & Co., London
- Lubbock J. (1905) Notes on The Life History of British Flowering Plants, Macmillan & Co., London
- Lubbock J. (1905) Happiness and Thrift, Macmillan & Co., London
- Lubbock J. (1906) On Municipal and National Trading, Macmillan & Co., London
- Lubbock J. (1909) On Peace and Happiness, Macmillan & Co., London
- Lubbock J. (1911) Marriage, Totemism and Religion, Longmans, Green & Co., London

Parliament of the United Kingdom
Preceded by Charles Buxton; James Whatman	Member of Parliament for Maidstone; 1870–1880; With: James Whatman 1865–1874; Sir Sydney Waterlow 1874–1880	Succeeded by Alexander Henry Ross; John Evans Freke-Aylmer
Preceded by Robert Lowe	Member of Parliament for London University; 1880–1900	Succeeded by Sir Michael Foster
Political offices
Preceded by The Earl of Rosebery	Chairman of the London County Council; 1890–1892	Succeeded by The Earl of Rosebery
Academic offices
Preceded by George Grote	Vice-Chancellor of University of London; 1872–1880	Succeeded by Sir George Jessel
Preceded by Andrew Carnegie	Rector of the University of St Andrews; 1907–1910	Succeeded by The Earl of Rosebery
Peerage of the United Kingdom
New creation	Baron Avebury; 1900–1913	Succeeded by John Lubbock
Baronetage of the United Kingdom
Preceded by John Lubbock	Baronet of Lammas; 1865–1913	Succeeded by John Lubbock
