= Basil Lubbock =

British sailor and maritime historian

Basil Lubbock MC
- Born: 9 September 1876; Arkley, Hertfordshire, England
- Died: 3 September 1944 (aged 67); East Blatchington, Sussex, England
- Occupations: sailor, historian, maritime writer
- Spouse: Dorothy Mary Warner
- Father: Alfred Lubbock

Alfred Basil Lubbock MC (9 September 1876 – 3 September 1944) was a British historian, sailor and soldier. He was a prolific writer on the last generation of commercial sailing vessels in the Age of Sail. He was an early (1911) member of the Society for Nautical Research, served on its council (1921–1924) and contributed to its journal, The Mariner's Mirror.

== Biography ==
He was born 9 September 1876 at Rowley Bank, Arkley, Hertfordshire, the second of five children. His father, who was also named Alfred Lubbock, had married his mother, Louisa Wallroth, in 1875. Alfred senior worked as an underwriter for Lloyd's of London and was a director in Robarts, Lubbock & Co, a private bank founded in 1772. He was descended from Sir John Lubbock, 2nd Baronet.

Basil Lubbock spent most of his early life in the care of an uncle. He was educated at Eton College, where he was a member of the cricket team, 1894–95. (His father had also attended Eton, where he was a noted sportsman. Lubbock senior continued to play cricket as an adult and was considered one of the best batsmen in England). While at Eton, Lubbock junior acquired some skill in drawing and watercolour painting. Some of his paintings appeared in his first book. Others are held in the collection of the National Maritime Museum, London. He was expected to follow family tradition and attend King's College, Cambridge. Instead he decided to travel and left Britain by steamship for Canada.

In 1898 he set out for the Klondike Gold Rush. He sailed to Alaska in the steamer City of Seattle and hiked over the Chilkoot Trail to the Yukon gold fields. After several unsuccessful months, and a harsh winter, he gave up gold prospecting.

He spent the summer of 1899 on Vancouver Island, intending to prospect for copper. He abandoned the idea and instead went to San Francisco where he briefly joined the California Cricket Club.

On 12 July 1899, he signed on to serve as a crewman of the British-registered four-masted barque Ross-shire which had just arrived from Japan. The vessel sailed on 25 August, bound for Queentown. His account of the voyage was published as Round the horn before the mast (1902), his first book.

Lubbock travelled to South Africa to serve in the Boer War. He was commissioned as a lieutenant in the Royal Field Artillery (RFA). By 6 March 1901, at Durban, he had joined Menne's Scouts. He was mentioned in despatches on 8 August 1901 for helping to rescue another scout whose horse had been shot from under him. Lubbock was admitted to hospital shortly after the incident. After the war ended in 1902 he returned to England.

On 13 March 1903, he arrived New York aboard the White Star liner Germanic on route to Canada. In 1903, he signed on as a crewman on the full-rigged iron-hulled saling ship Commonwealth. While aboard he fell from the rigging and injured his thigh and broke his ankle, which left him with a slight life-long limp.

He was back in England by 1905 when he joined the recently formed Legion of Frontiersmen. He also began yachting around then. By 1908, he was living in the new family home, Kilmarth Manor, in Cornwall and playing for the Cornwall County Cricket Club. He was living in Chelsea, London, by 1911. In May 1912, he married Dorothy Mary Warner. She was from a large family and had 20 siblings, the youngest of whom was the noted cricketer, Plum Warner. The couple were living in the coastal village of Hamble-le-Rice, Hampshire, by 1913.

He was a member of the Territorial Force by November 1914 when he and his wife boarded a steamship at Tilbury for India. They arrived at Bombay in December and by April 1915 he was attending the army signal school at Poona. They returned to the United Kingdom where he joined the artillery. He was a second lieutenant by October 1915. In June 1916 he was made an acting lieutenant with the Royal Field Artillery (RFA). In October 1916, he was made acting captain attached to 52 brigade RFA. He was awarded the Military Cross while serving on the Western Front. He reverted to the rank of lieutenant when he stood down from active service in April 1919. When he finally left the Territorial Force in 1921, he was granted the rank of captain.

Lubbock had been yachting since at least 1905 and after the war he became more involved. He became the first Commodore of the Hamble River Sailing Club in 1919. He sailed extensively himself and worked with Alfred Westmacott to develop a new yacht design, the Hamble One Design Class.

Lubbock had a long and active friendship with Captain Wilfred Dowman, the man who purchased the Cutty Sark back from the Portuguese; their friendship sprang from examining the work log of the Cutty Sark. He wrote two works that deal with that famous clipper: The Log of the Cutty Sark and Sail: The Romance of the Clipper Ships.

Basil Lubbock died on 3 September 1944 at Monks Orchard, East Blatchington, Sussex, aged 67. His wife, Dorothy, died soon after, on 15 November of the same year.

== Legacy ==
Lubbock is not regarded as a completely reliable source as a historian. His books had no footnotes or bibliographies, as was common at the time. He relied on correspondence and interviews with captains and crewmembers, rather than documents and fact-checking. He sometimes confused the names of ships and captains, or gave incorrect dates. However, Lubbock's correspondence and interviews are themselves a unique source. Some of his books are still in print and their contents are often quoted by others.

His book The China Clippers was an inspiration for All the Tea in China by Kyril Bonfiglioli.

== Works ==
- Round the Horn Before the Mast, 1902
- Nineteenth Century Dramatic Stories of Atlantic Crossings, 1905
- Jack Derringer, A Tale of Deep Water, 1906
- Deep Sea Warriors, 1909
- The China Clippers, 1914
- The Colonial Clippers, 1921
- Cruisers, corsairs & slavers : an account of the suppression of the picaroon, pirate & slaver by the Royal Navy during the 19th century, 1922
- The Blackwall Frigates, 1922
- The Log of the Cutty Sark, 1924
- Adventures by Sea from Art of Old Time, 1925
- The Western Ocean Packets, 1925
- The Last of the Windjammers, two volumes, 1927, 1929
- Sail, The Romance of the Clipper Ships (illus. Jack Spurling, ed. F. A. Hook), three volumes, 1927, 1929, 1936
- The Down Easters. American Deep-water Sailing Ships 1869-1929, 1929
- Bully Hayes, South Sea Pirate, 1931
- The Nitrate Clippers, 1932
- The Opium Clippers, 1933
- The Coolie Ships and Oil Sailers, 1935
- The Arctic Whalers, 1937
