= List of fauna of Michigan =

This is a list of fauna found in the U.S. state of Michigan, including those of wider distribution. See also List of threatened fauna of Michigan.

The following codes are used to designate the status of certain species:

- (I) Introduced - population established in Michigan as result of direct or indirect human action
- (M) Marginal - presence of the animal is inconsistent/sparse
- (X) Extirpated - this species was once in the state but is not presently
- (R) Reintroduced - this species was formerly extirpated from the state but has since been re-established.

== Invertebrates ==
=== Cnidaria ===
- Craspedacusta sowerbyi

=== Arthropods ===
==== Arachnids ====
- Araneus diadematus
- Dermacentor variabilis
- Dolomedes tenebrosus
- Leiobunum vittatum
- Leucauge venusta
- Misumenops celer
- Neoscona crucifera
- Phidippus audax
- Pisaurina mira
- Platycryptus undatus
- Salticus scenicus

==== Crustaceans ====
- Armadillidium vulgare (common pillbug) (I)
- Cambarus robustus (big water crayfish)
- Creaserinus fodiens (digger crayfish)
- Faxonius immunis (calico crayfish)
- Faxonius propinquus (northern clearwater crayfish)
- Faxonius rusticus (rusty crayfish)
- Faxonius virilis (northern crayfish)
- Lacunicambarus nebrascensis
- Lacunicambarus polychromatus
- Procambarus acutus (white river crawfish)
- Procambarus clarkii

==== Insects ====
===== Coleoptera =====
- Brychius hungerfordi
- Chauliognathus pensylvanicus
- Cicindela sexguttata
- Coccinella septempunctata (I)
- Exomala orientalis (I)
- Leptinotarsa decemlineata
- Desmocerus palliatus
- Harmonia axyridis (I)
- Megacyllene robiniae
- Monochamus scutellatus
- Neandra brunnea
- Photinus pyralis
- Polydrusus formosus (I)
- Popillia japonica (I)
- Rhyssomatus lineaticollis
- Tetraopes tetrophthalmus

===== Diptera =====
- Chironomus plumosus
- Efferia aestuans
- Eurosta solidaginis
- Toxomerus geminatus
- Toxomerus marginatus
- Xenox tigrinus

===== Mantodea =====
- Mantis religiosa (I)
- Tenodera sinensis (I)

===== Hemiptera =====
- Acanthocephala terminalis
- Adelphocoris lineolatus (I)
- Boisea trivittata
- Chinavia hilaris
- Graphocephala coccinea
- Halyomorpha halys (I)
- Leptoglossus occidentalis
- Lygaeus kalmii
- Neotibicen canicularis
- Oncopeltus fasciatus
- Zelus luridus

===== Hymenoptera =====
- Apis mellifera (I)
- Bombus bimaculatus
- Bombus griseocollis
- Bombus impatiens
- Bombus ternarius
- Camponotus pennsylvanicus
- Dolichovespula maculata
- Polistes dominulus (I)
- Polistes fuscatus
- Polistes metricus
- Vespa crabro (I)
- Vespula maculifrons
- Xylocopa virginica

===== Odonata =====
- Anax junius
- Argia fumipennis
- Calopteryx maculata
- Erythemis simplicicollis
- Ischnura posita
- Ischnura verticalis
- Lestes vigilax
- Libellula luctuosa
- Pachydiplax longipennis
- Plathemis lydia
- Sympetrum vicinum

===== Orthoptera =====
- Appalachia arcana
- Dissosteira carolina
- Gryllus pennsylvanicus
- Melanoplus bivittatus
- Melanoplus differentialis
- Melanoplus femurrubrum
- Neoconocephalus retusus
- Oecanthus laricis
- Oecanthus pini
- Phyllopalpus pulchellus
- Trimerotropis huroniana

==== Entognatha ====
- Bourletiella hortensis
- Homidia socia
- Lepidocyrtus paradoxus (I)
- Orchesella cincta (I)
- Tomocerus minor
- Willowsia nigromaculata

=== Molluscs ===
- Arion subfuscus (I)
- Cepaea nemoralis (I)
- Cipangopaludina chinensis (I)
- Dreissena bugensis (I)
- Dreissena polymorpha (I)
- Limax maximus (I)
- Pyganodon grandis

== Vertebrates ==
=== Birds ===
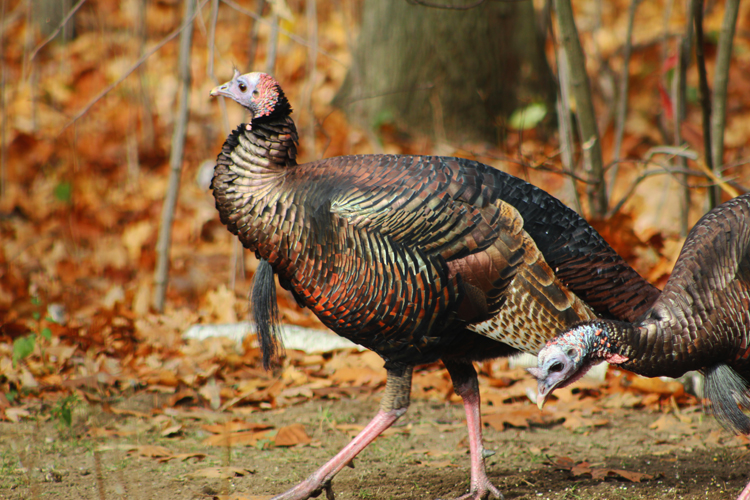
Wild turkeys in Clyde

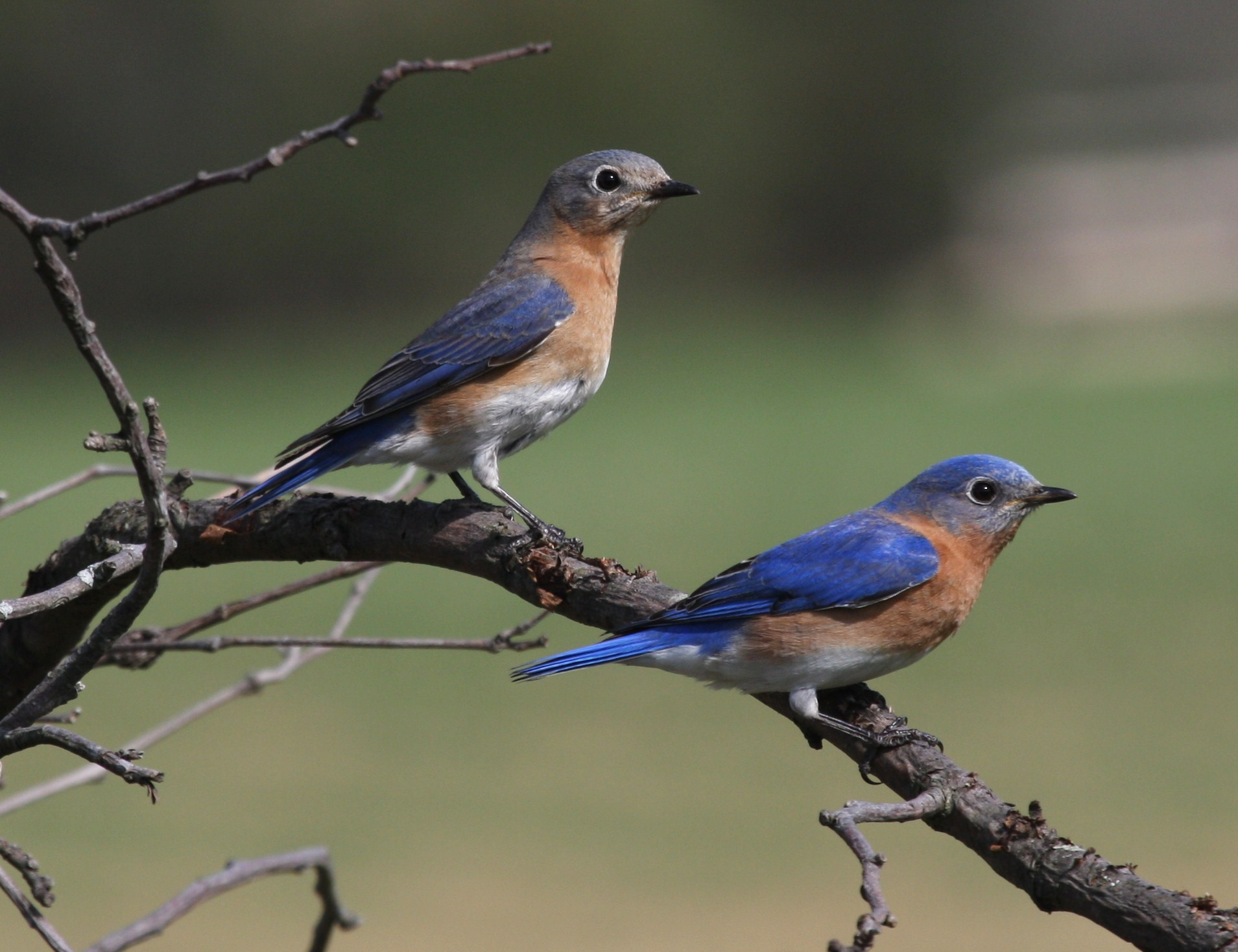
Eastern bluebirds in Michigan

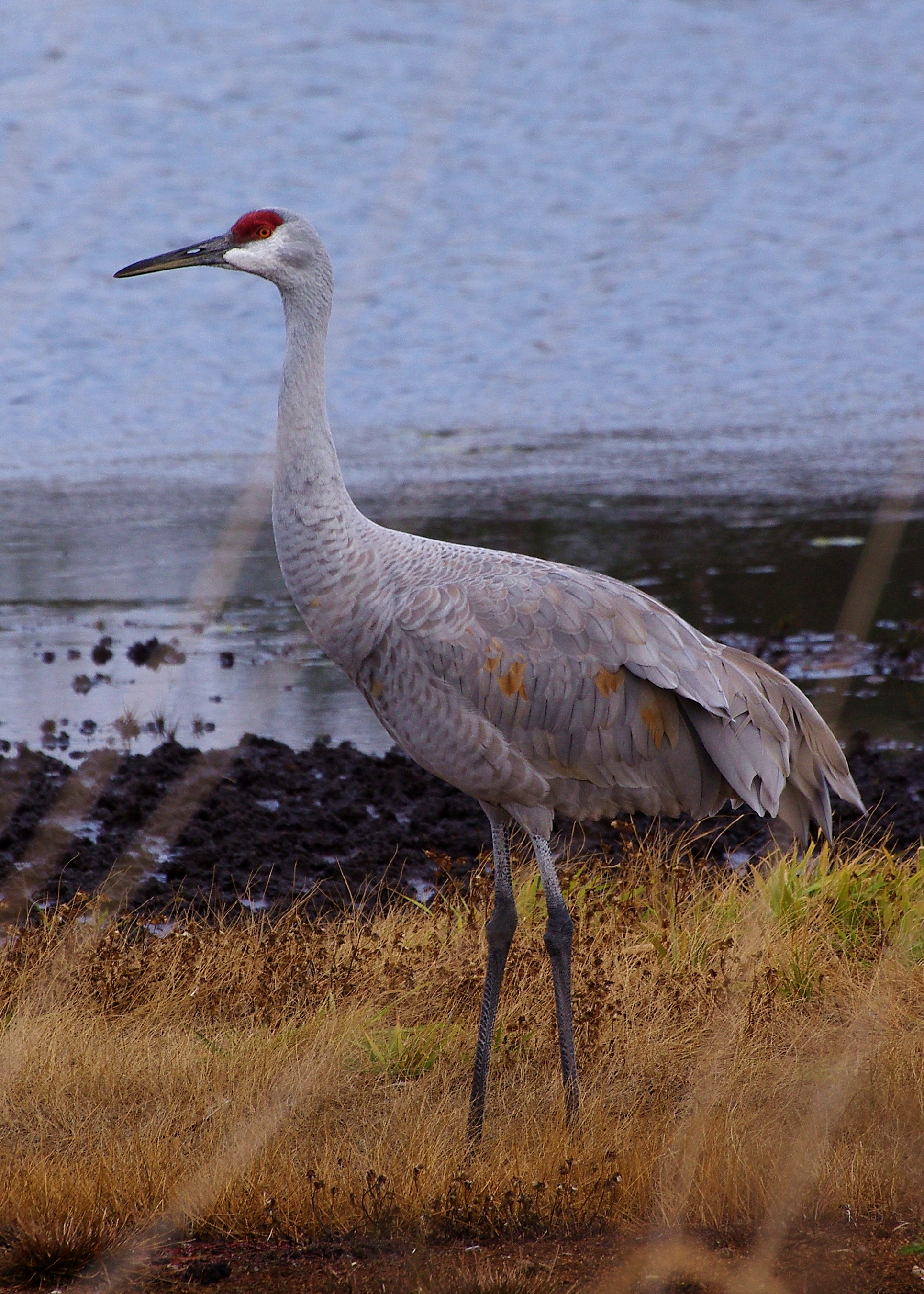
Sandhill crane in Michigan

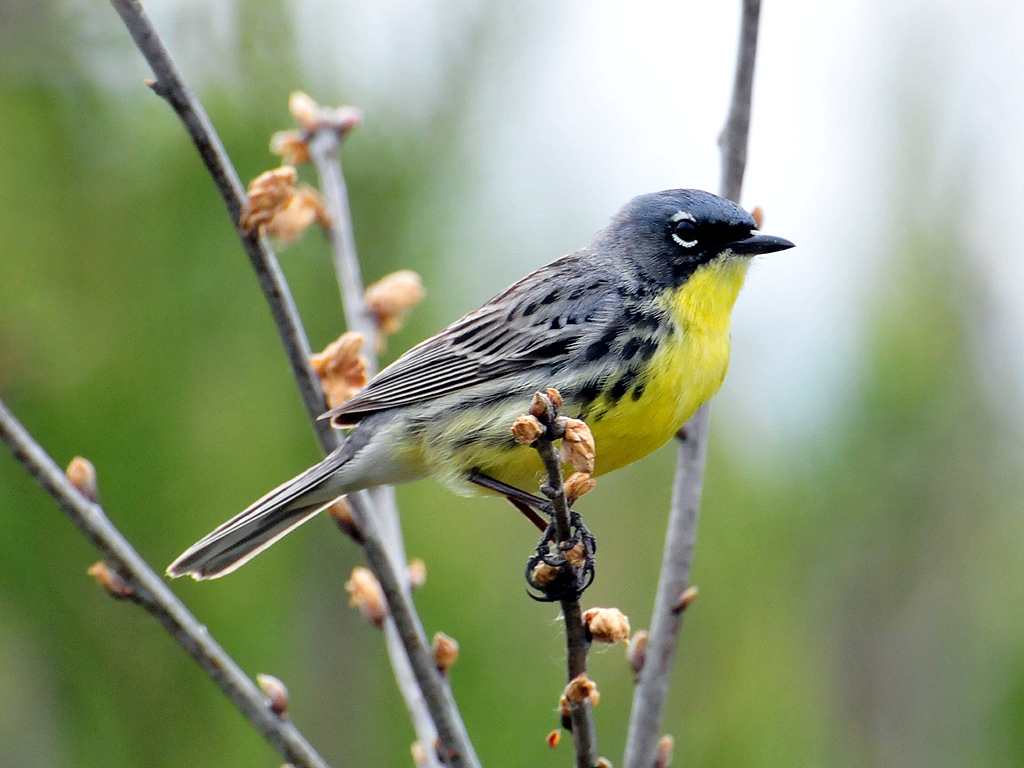
Kirtland warbler in Michigan

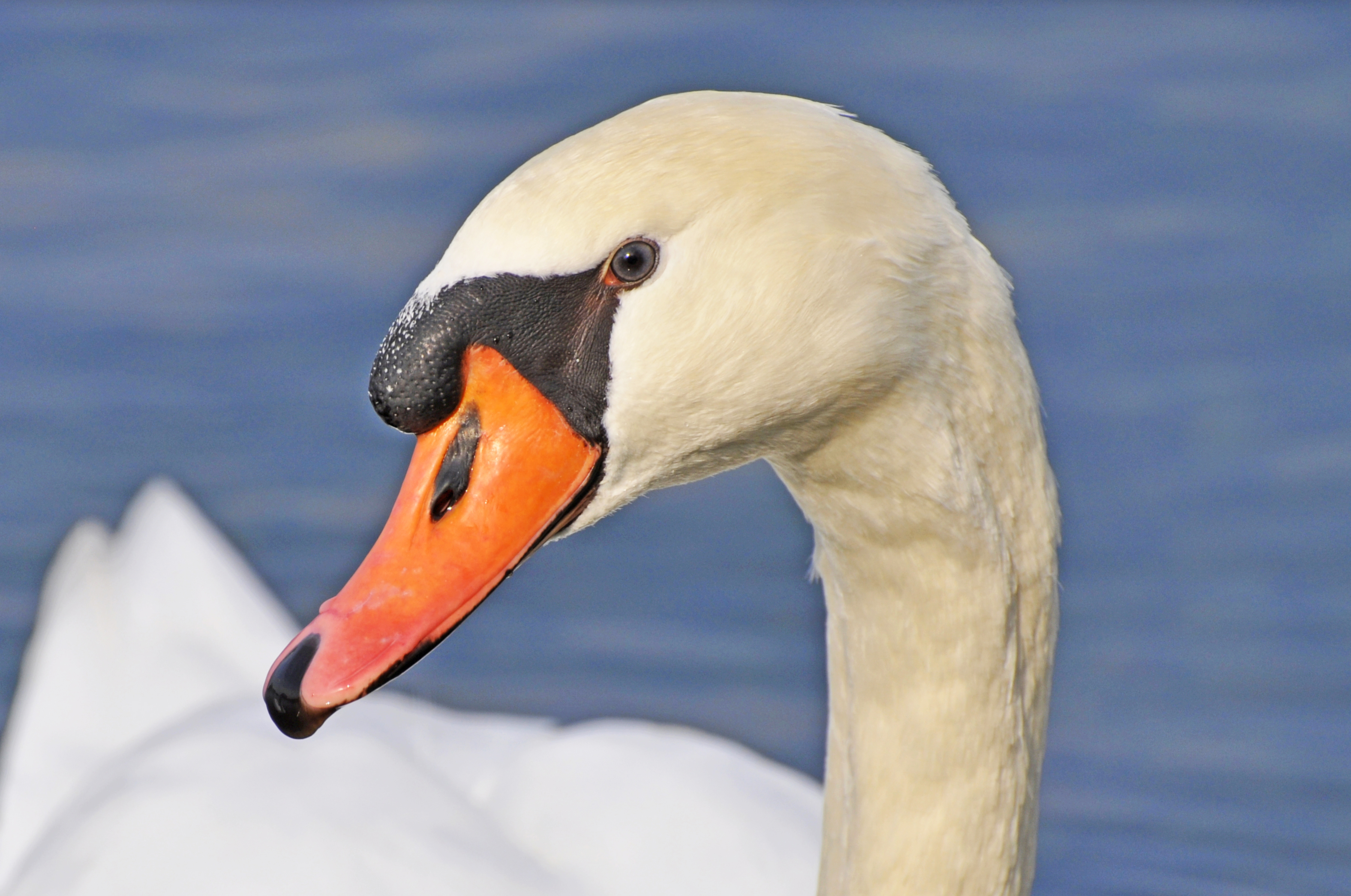
Mute swan in Michigan

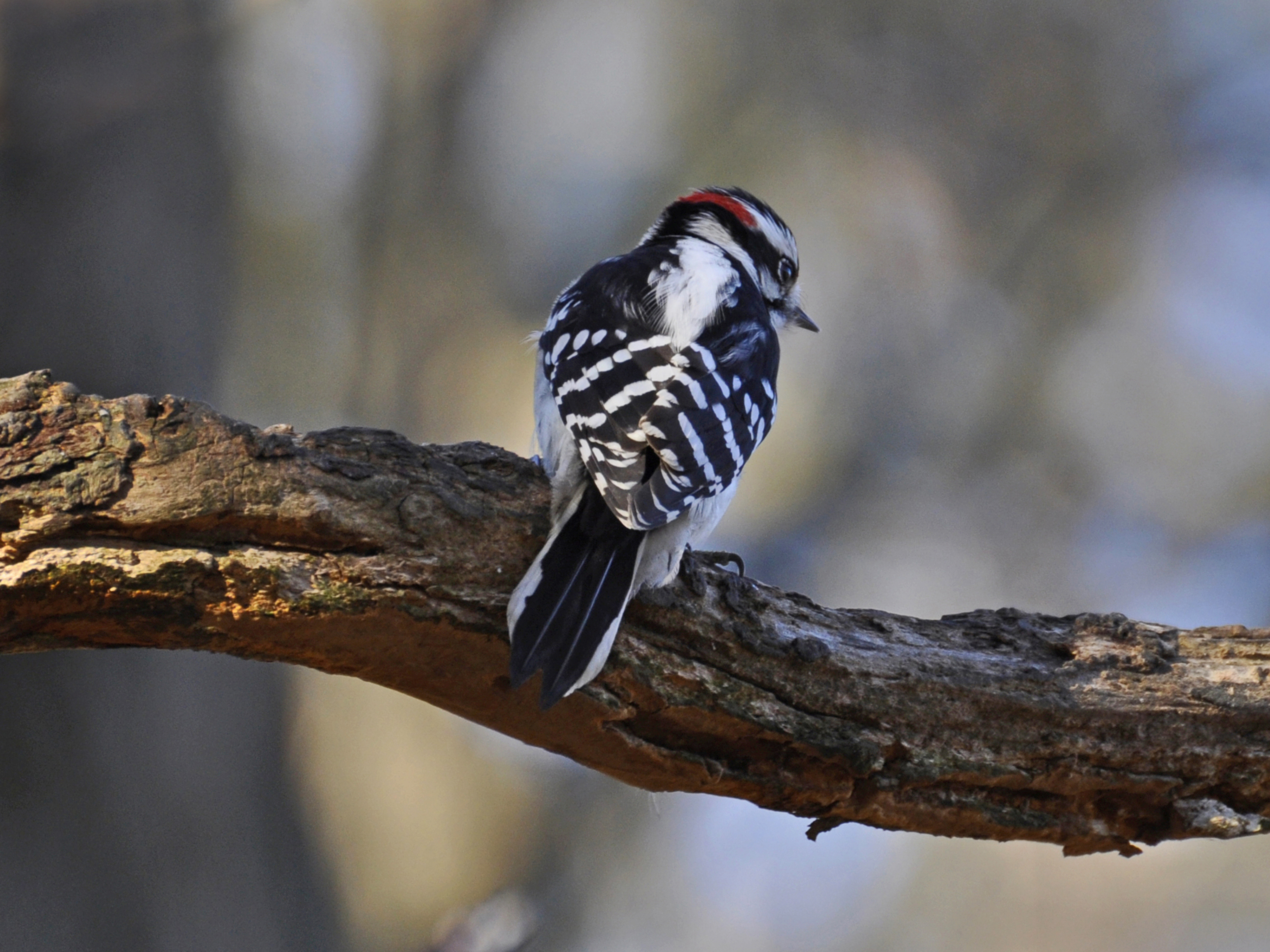
Downy woodpecker in Michigan

=== Fish ===
- Alosa pseudoharengus (I)
- Ambloplites rupestris
- Ameiurus melas
- Ameiurus natalis
- Ameiurus nebulosus
- Aplodinotus grunniens
- Carassius auratus (I)
- Carpiodes cyprinus
- Catostomus catostomus
- Catostomus commersonii
- Coregonus artedi
- Coregonus clupeaformis
- Culaea inconstans
- Cyprinus carpio (I)
- Dorosoma cepedianum
- Esox americanus
- Esox lucius
- Esox masquinongy
- Etheostoma caeruleum
- Gambusia affinis (I)
- Gasterosteus aculeatus (I)
- Gymnocephalus cernuus (I)
- Hiodon tergisus
- Huso fulvescens
- Hypentelium nigricans
- Ictalurus punctatus
- Ictiobus bubalus
- Ictiobus cyprinellus
- Ictiobus niger (I)
- Labidesthes sicculus
- Lepisosteus oculatus
- Lepisosteus osseus
- Lepomis cyanellus
- Lepomis gibbosus
- Lepomis gulosus
- Lepomis humilis
- Lepomis macrochirus
- Lepomis microlophus (I)
- Lota lota
- Micropterus dolomieu
- Micropterus nigricans
- Morone americana (I)
- Morone chrysops
- Moxostoma carinatum
- Neogobius melanostomus (I)
- Noturus flavus
- Oncorhynchus gorbuscha (I)
- Oncorhynchus kisutch (I)
- Oncorhynchus mykiss (I)
- Oncorhynchus tshawytscha (I)
- Osmerus mordax (I)
- Perca flavescens
- Percopsis omiscomaycus
- Petromyzon marinus (I)
- Pomoxis annularis
- Pomoxis nigromaculatus
- Prosopium cylindraceum
- Pungitius pungitius
- Pylodictis olivaris (I)
- Salmo salar (I)
- Salmo trutta (I)
- Salvelinus fontinalis
- Salvelinus namaycush
- Splake (Salvelinus namaycush × Salvelinus fontinalis)
- Sander vitreus
- Semotilus atromaculatus

==== Extinct fish ====
- Coregonus nigripinnis
- Coregonus johannae

=== Mammals ===
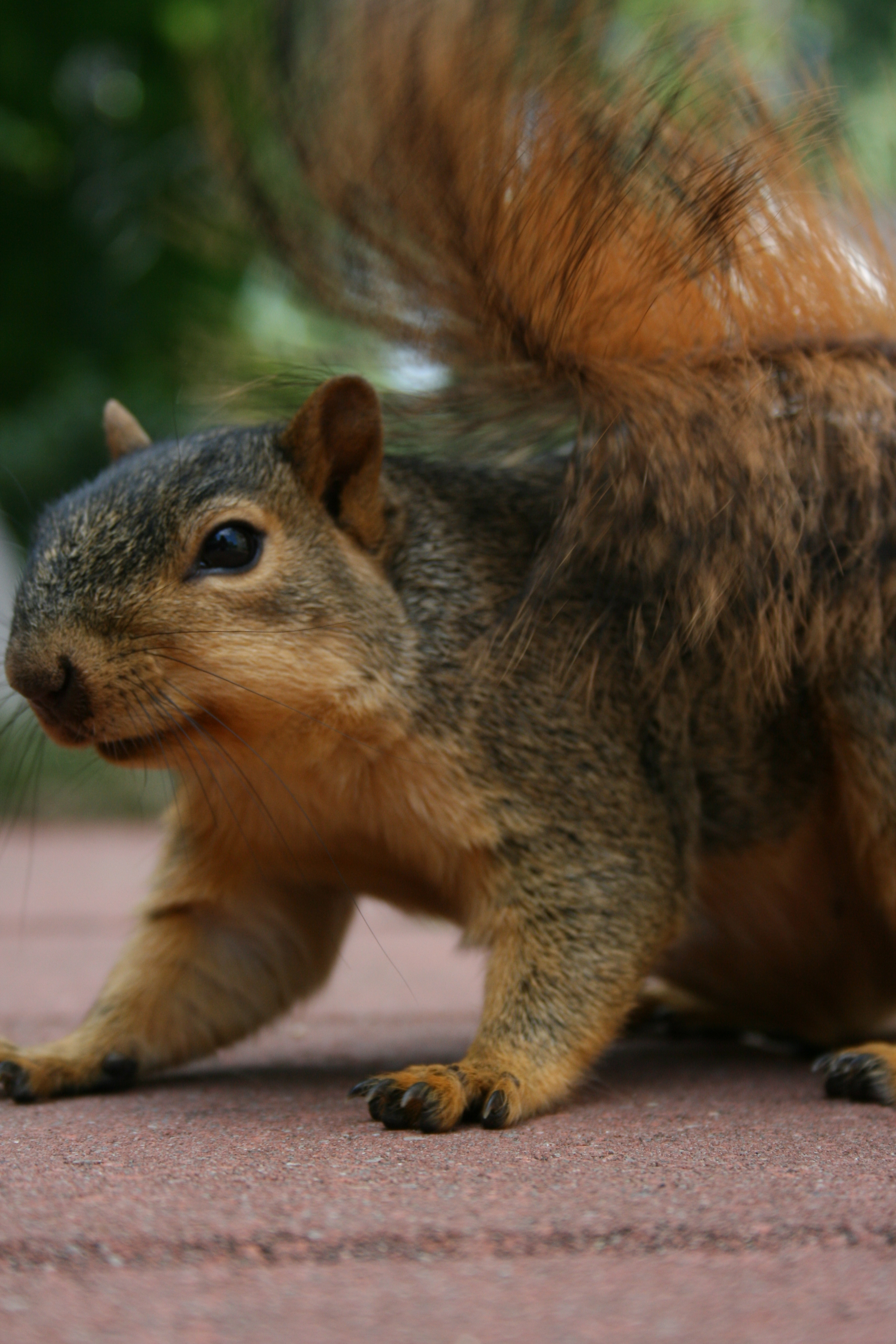
Fox squirrel in Portage, Michigan

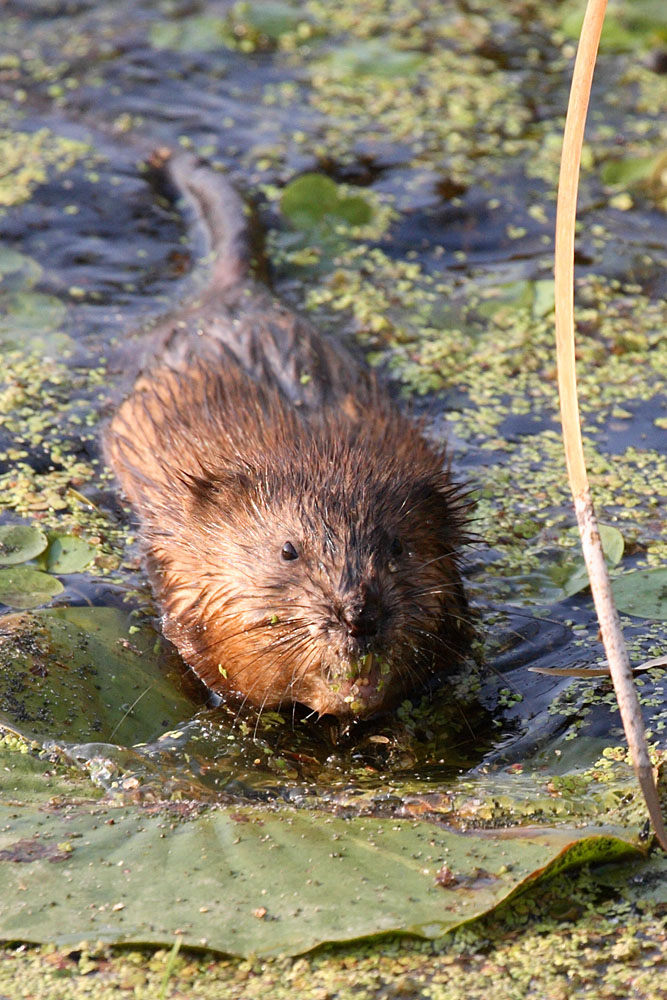
Muskrat in Brownstown, Michigan

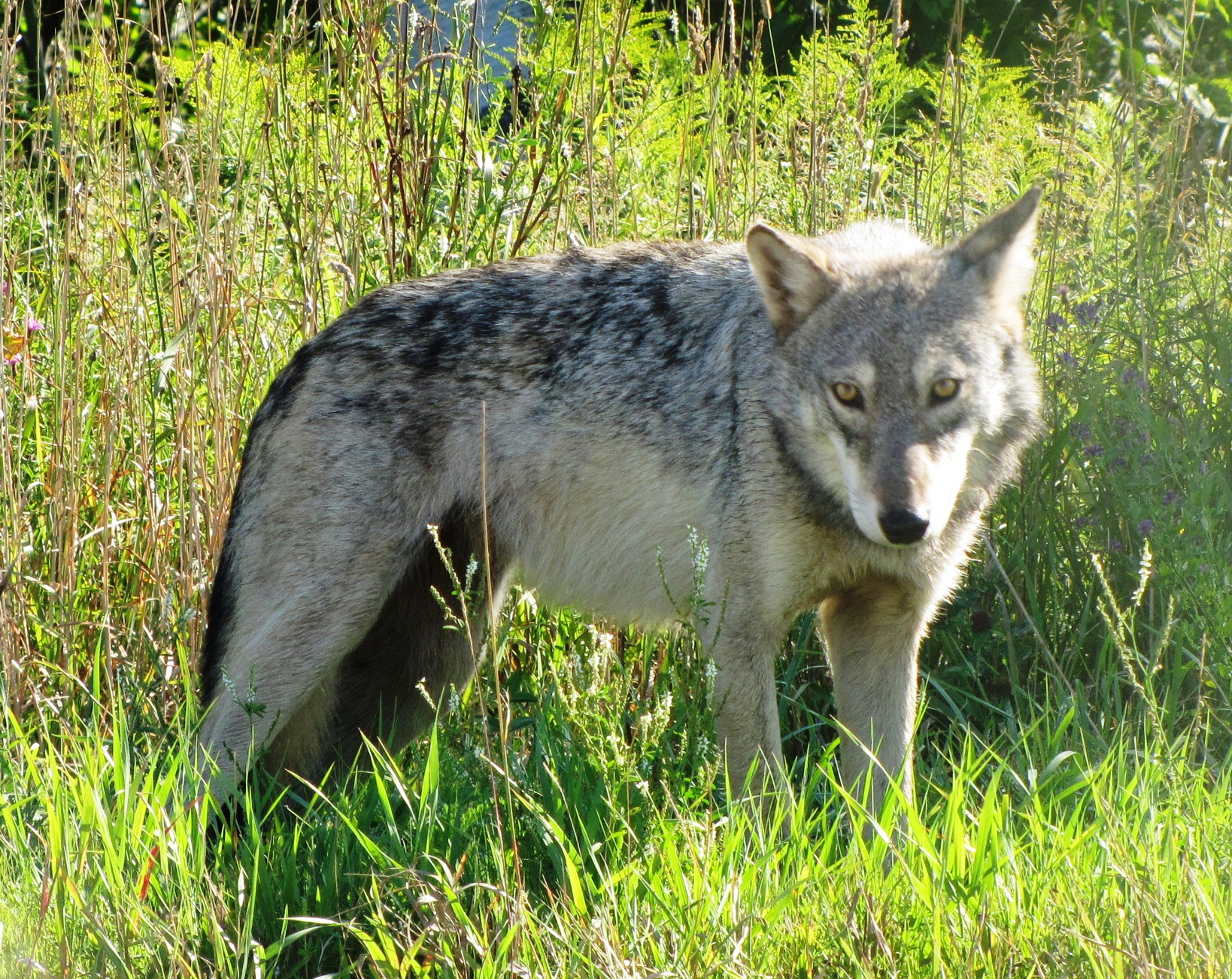
Wolf at Seney National Wildlife Refuge, Michigan

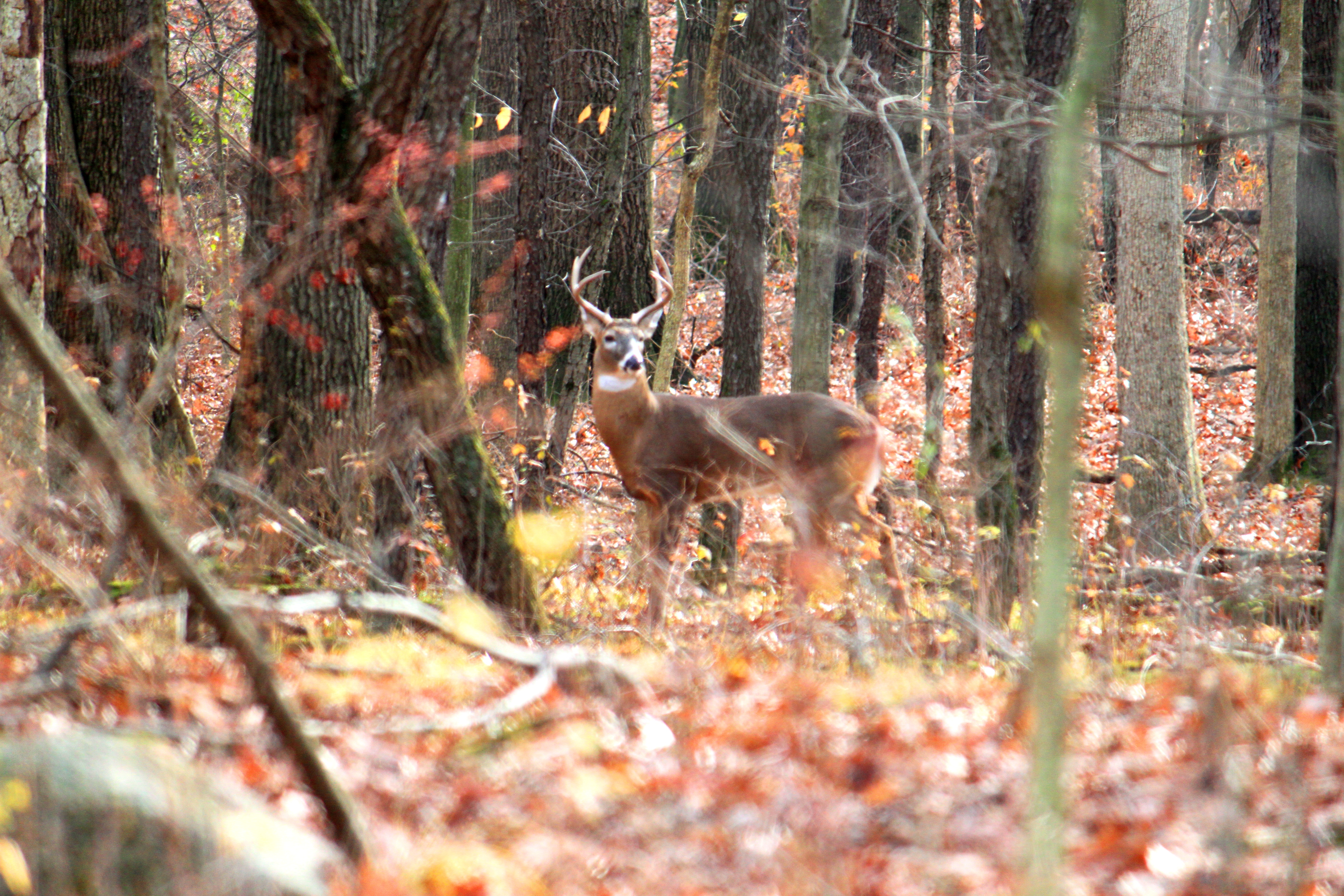
White-tailed deer at Milan, Michigan

==== Marsupialia (marsupials) ====
- Virginia opossum

==== Eulipotyphla (insectivores) ====
- American pygmy shrew
- American water shrew
- Arctic shrew
- Eastern mole
- Least shrew
- Masked shrew
- Northern short-tailed shrew
- Smoky shrew (M)
- Star-nosed mole

==== Chiroptera (bats) ====
- Big brown bat
- Eastern red bat
- Evening bat
- Hoary bat
- Indiana bat
- Little brown bat
- Northern long-eared bat
- Silver-haired bat
- Tricolored bat

==== Lagomorpha (lagomorphs) ====
- Eastern cottontail rabbit
- European hare (I & M)
- Snowshoe hare

==== Rodentia (rodents) ====
- American red squirrel
- Beaver
- Brown rat (I)
- Deer mouse
- Eastern gray squirrel
- Eastern chipmunk
- Fox squirrel
- Groundhog
- House mouse (I)
- Least chipmunk
- Meadow vole
- Meadow jumping mouse
- Muskrat
- North American porcupine
- Prairie vole
- Southern bog lemming
- Southern flying squirrel
- Thirteen-lined ground squirrel
- White-footed mouse
- Woodland jumping mouse
- Woodland vole

==== Carnivora (carnivores) ====
- American badger
- American black bear
- American ermine
- American marten
- Bobcat
- Canada lynx
- Cougar (M)
- Coyote
- Eastern wolf (R)
- Fisher
- Gray fox
- Gray wolf
- Least weasel
- Long-tailed weasel
- Mink
- North American river otter
- Raccoon
- Red fox
- Striped skunk
- Wolverine (X)

==== Artiodactyla (even-toed ungulates) ====
- American bison (X)
- Elk (R)
- Moose (R)
- Sika deer (I)
- White-tailed deer
- Woodland caribou (X)
