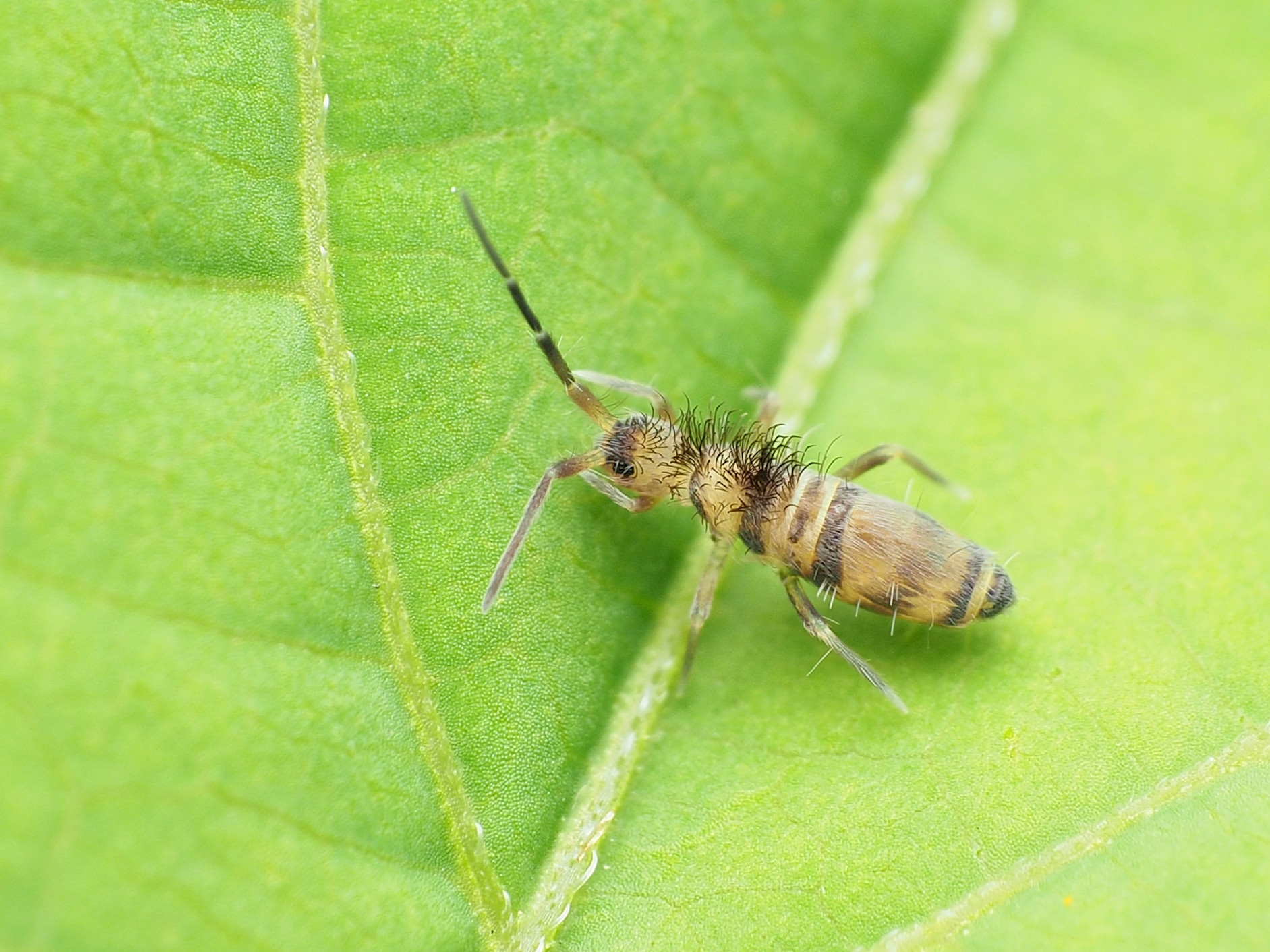

Scientific classification
- Domain: Eukaryota
- Kingdom: Animalia
- Phylum: Arthropoda
- Class: Collembola
- Order: Entomobryomorpha
- Family: Entomobryidae
- Genus: Homidia
- Species: H. sauteri

Binomial name
- Homidia sauteri (Börner, C, 1909) Denis, 1929

= Homidia sauteri =

Species of springtail

Homidia sauteri is a species of slender springtail in the family Entomobryidae.

== Subspecies ==
These two subspecies belong to the species Homidia sauteri:

- Homidia sauteri formosana Uchida, 1943
- Homidia sauteri sauteri
