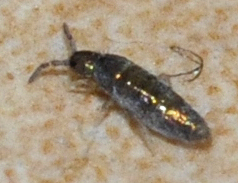

Scientific classification
- Kingdom: Animalia
- Phylum: Arthropoda
- Class: Collembola
- Order: Entomobryomorpha
- Family: Entomobryidae
- Genus: Lepidocyrtus
- Species: L. cyaneus

Binomial name
- Lepidocyrtus cyaneus Tullberg, 1871

= Lepidocyrtus cyaneus =

Species of springtail

Lepidocyrtus cyaneus is a species of slender springtail in the family Entomobryidae. It is found in Europe.

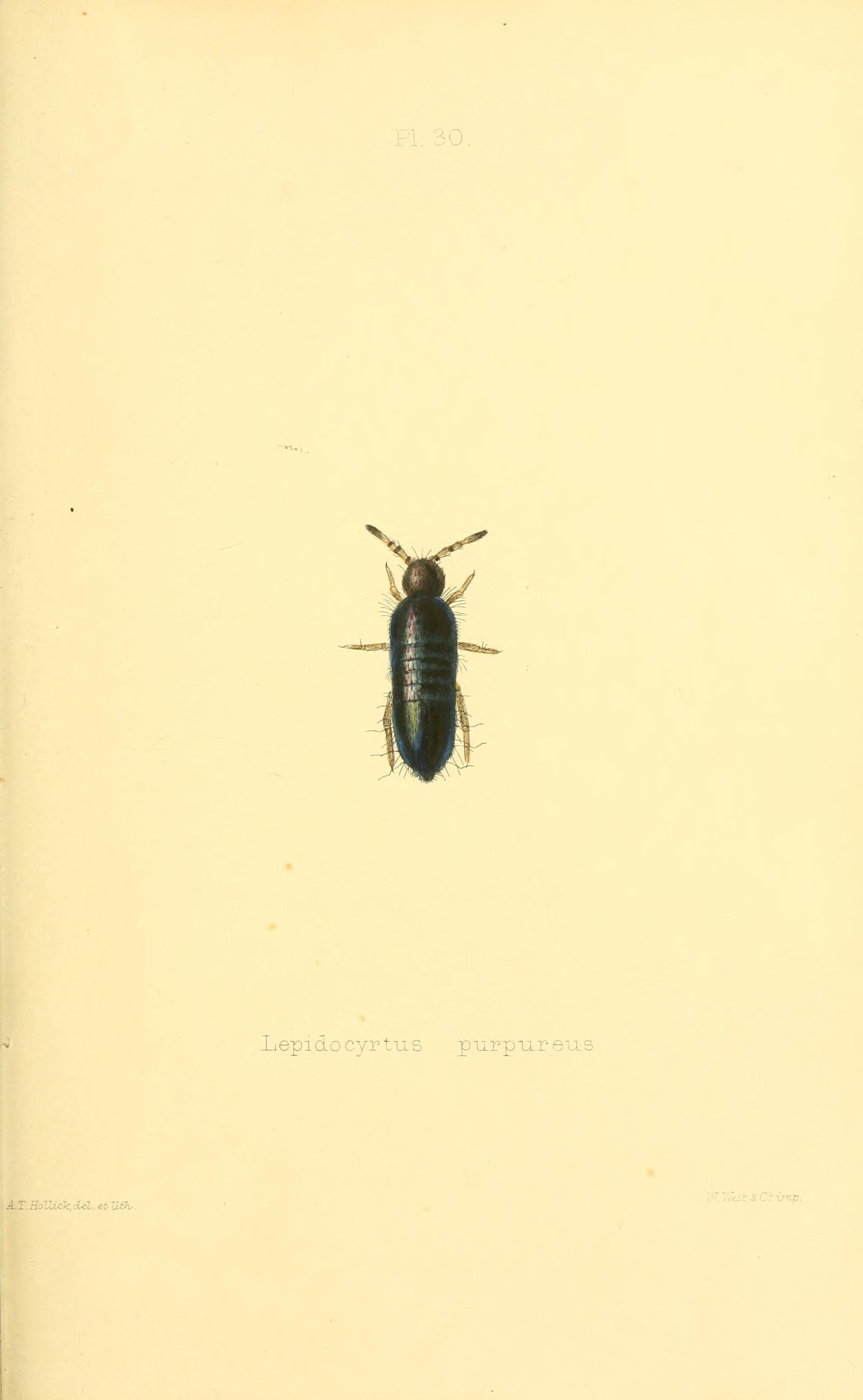
Illustration of L. purpureus.
