= Homidia pentachaeta =

Scientific classification
- Domain: Eukaryota
- Kingdom: Animalia
- Phylum: Arthropoda
- Class: Collembola
- Order: Entomobryomorpha
- Family: Entomobryidae
- Genus: Homidia
- Species: H. pentachaeta

Binomial name
- Homidia pentachaeta Li & Christiansen, 1997

Species of springtail

Homidia pentachaeta is a species of soil-dwelling springtail belonging to the family Entomobryidae. It is only known from its type location in the vicinity of Nanjing, People's Republic of China.

This is a white to pale purple springtail up to 3 mm in length with dark blue eye patches and a triangular dark patch between the antennae. There are 2 dark patches on the back of the thorax and another dark patch on the back of the abdomen. There is scattered dark pigmentation across the rest of the body. The main distinguishing feature of this species is the presence of five (rather than three or four in other Homidia species) macrochaetae laterally on the third abdominal segment. This is reflected in the specific name.
