= Homidia tiantaiensis =

Scientific classification
- Domain: Eukaryota
- Kingdom: Animalia
- Phylum: Arthropoda
- Class: Collembola
- Order: Entomobryomorpha
- Family: Entomobryidae
- Genus: Homidia
- Species: H. tiantaiensis

Binomial name
- Homidia tiantaiensis Chen & Lin, 1998

Species of springtail

Homidia tiantaiensis is a species of slender springtail in the family Entomobryidae. It can be found in China. It has been known to feed on Pleurotus ostreatus.
