= Lepidocyrtus floridensis =

Scientific classification
- Domain: Eukaryota
- Kingdom: Animalia
- Phylum: Arthropoda
- Class: Collembola
- Order: Entomobryomorpha
- Family: Entomobryidae
- Genus: Lepidocyrtus
- Species: L. floridensis

Binomial name
- Lepidocyrtus floridensis Snider, 1967

Species of springtail

Lepidocyrtus floridensis is a species of slender springtail in the family Entomobryidae.
