= Homidia nigrocephala =

Scientific classification
- Domain: Eukaryota
- Kingdom: Animalia
- Phylum: Arthropoda
- Class: Collembola
- Order: Entomobryomorpha
- Family: Entomobryidae
- Genus: Homidia
- Species: H. nigrocephala

Binomial name
- Homidia nigrocephala Uchida, 1943

Species of springtail

Homidia nigrocephala is a species of slender springtail in the family Entomobryidae.
