= Homidia similis =

Scientific classification
- Domain: Eukaryota
- Kingdom: Animalia
- Phylum: Arthropoda
- Class: Collembola
- Order: Entomobryomorpha
- Family: Entomobryidae
- Genus: Homidia
- Species: H. similis

Binomial name
- Homidia similis Szeptycki, 1973

Species of springtail

Homidia similis is a species of slender springtail in the family Entomobryidae.
