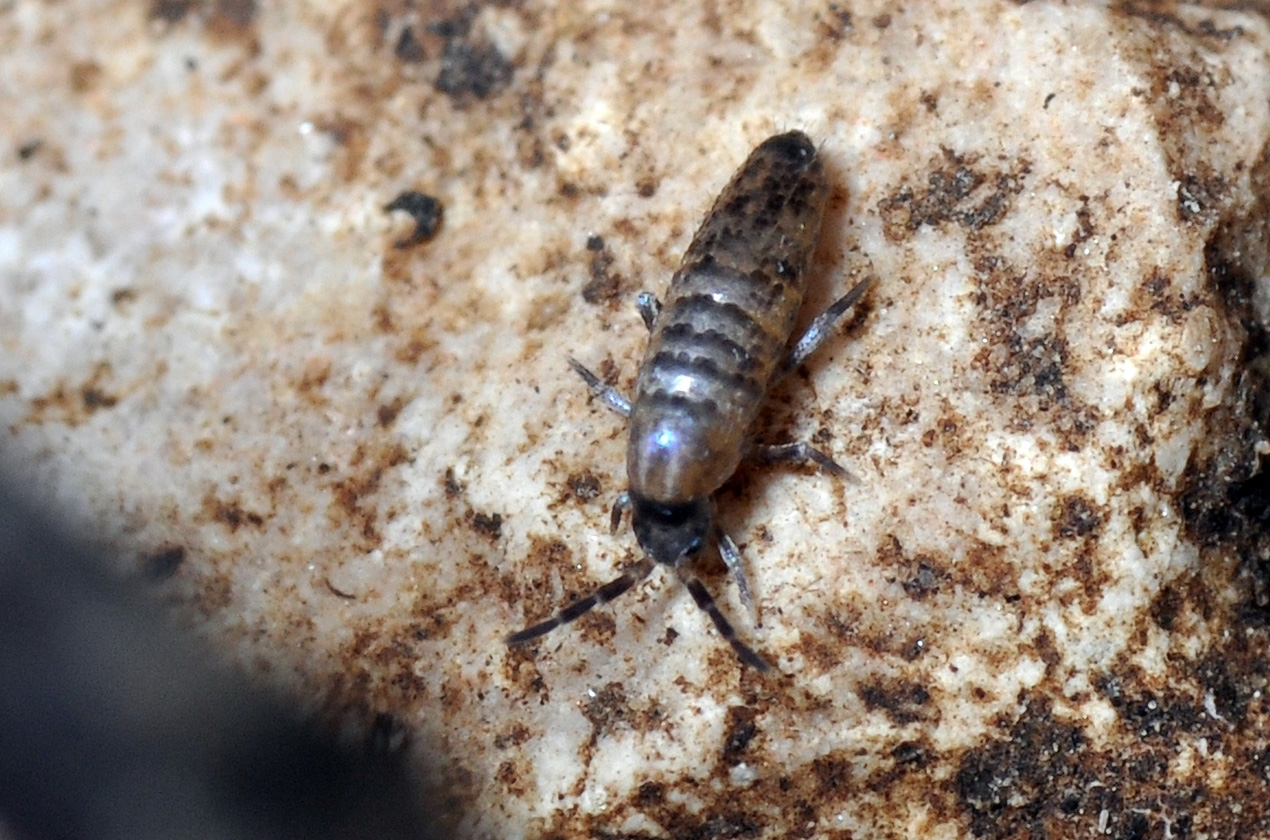

Scientific classification
- Kingdom: Animalia
- Phylum: Arthropoda
- Class: Collembola
- Order: Entomobryomorpha
- Family: Entomobryidae
- Genus: Lepidocyrtus
- Species: L. curvicollis

Binomial name
- Lepidocyrtus curvicollis Bourlet, 1839

= Lepidocyrtus curvicollis =

Species of springtail

Lepidocyrtus curvicollis is a species of slender springtail in the family Entomobryidae. It is found in Europe.

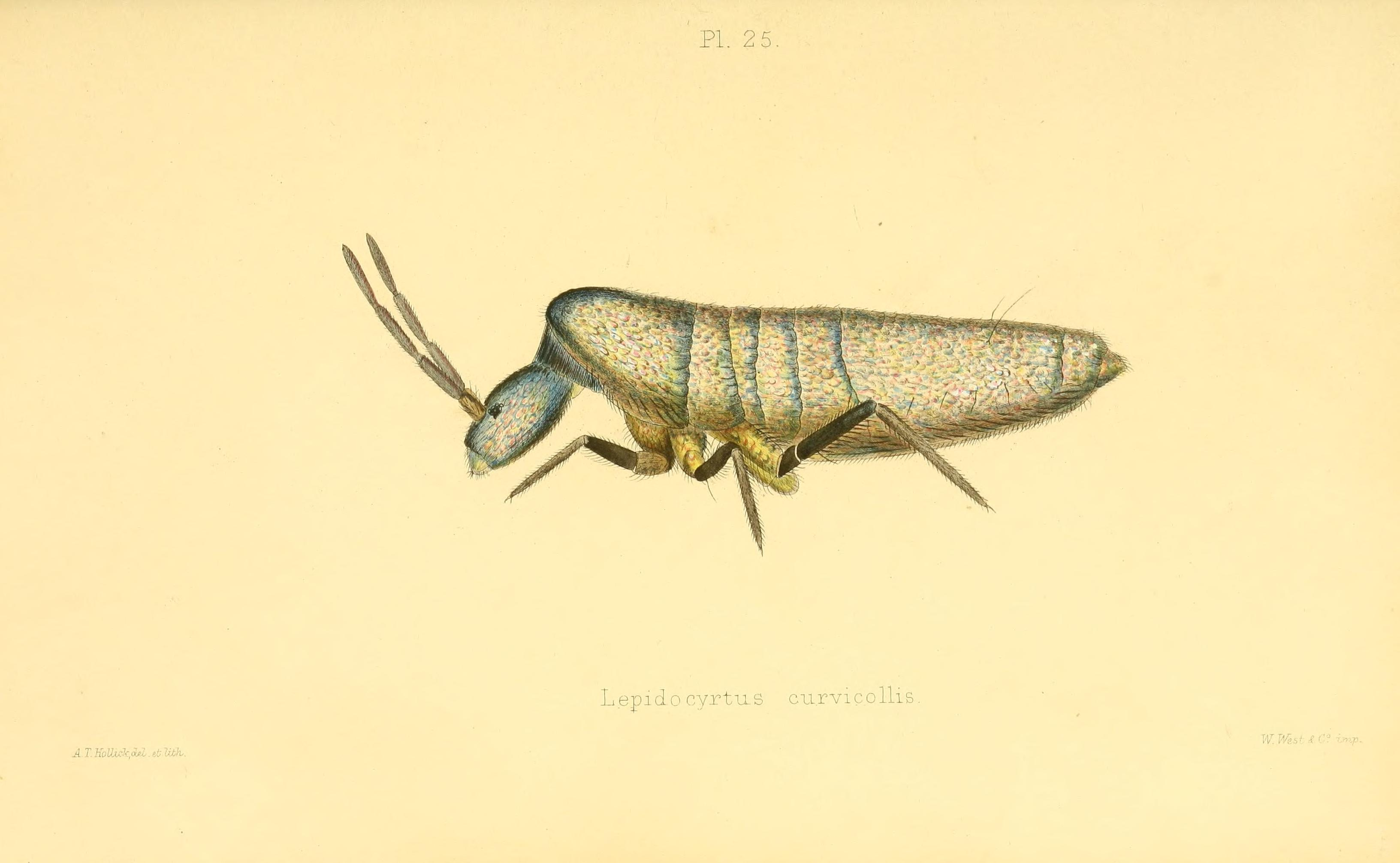
Illustration of L. curvicollis.
