= Homidia formosana =

Scientific classification
- Kingdom: Animalia
- Phylum: Arthropoda
- Class: Collembola
- Order: Entomobryomorpha
- Family: Entomobryidae
- Genus: Homidia
- Species: H. formosana

Binomial name
- Homidia formosana Uchida, 1943

Species of springtail

Homidia formosana is a species of slender springtail in the family Entomobryidae.
