= Lepidocyrtus neofasciatus =

Scientific classification
- Domain: Eukaryota
- Kingdom: Animalia
- Phylum: Arthropoda
- Class: Collembola
- Order: Entomobryomorpha
- Family: Entomobryidae
- Genus: Lepidocyrtus
- Species: L. neofasciatus

Binomial name
- Lepidocyrtus neofasciatus Wray, 1948

Synonyms
- Lepidocyrtus unifasciatus neofasciatus Wray, 1948

Species of springtail

Lepidocyrtus neofasciatus is a species of slender springtail in the family Entomobryidae.
