= Homidia subcingula =

Scientific classification
- Domain: Eukaryota
- Kingdom: Animalia
- Phylum: Arthropoda
- Class: Collembola
- Order: Entomobryomorpha
- Family: Entomobryidae
- Genus: Homidia
- Species: H. subcingula

Binomial name
- Homidia subcingula Denis, 1948

Species of springtail

Homidia subcingula is a species of slender springtail in the family Entomobryidae.
