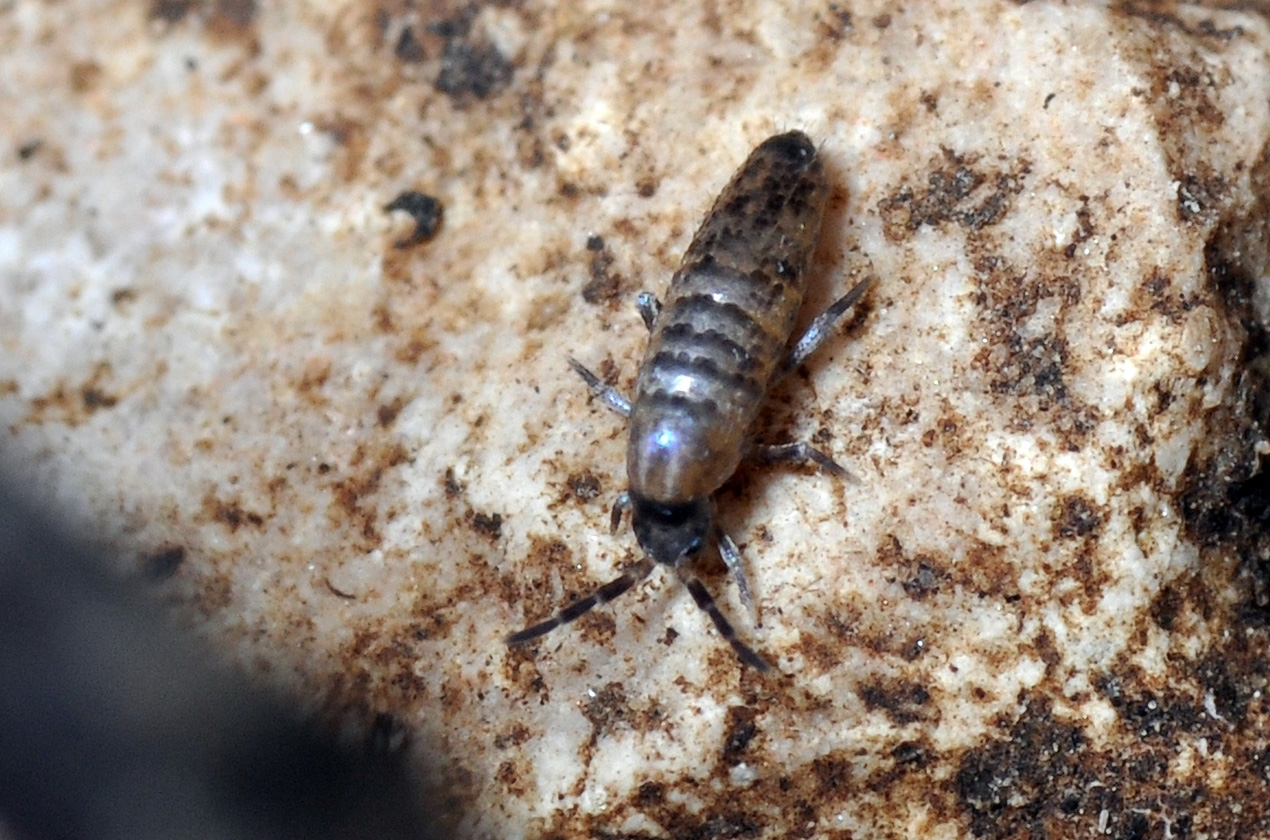
- 1. Lepidocyrtus curvicollis
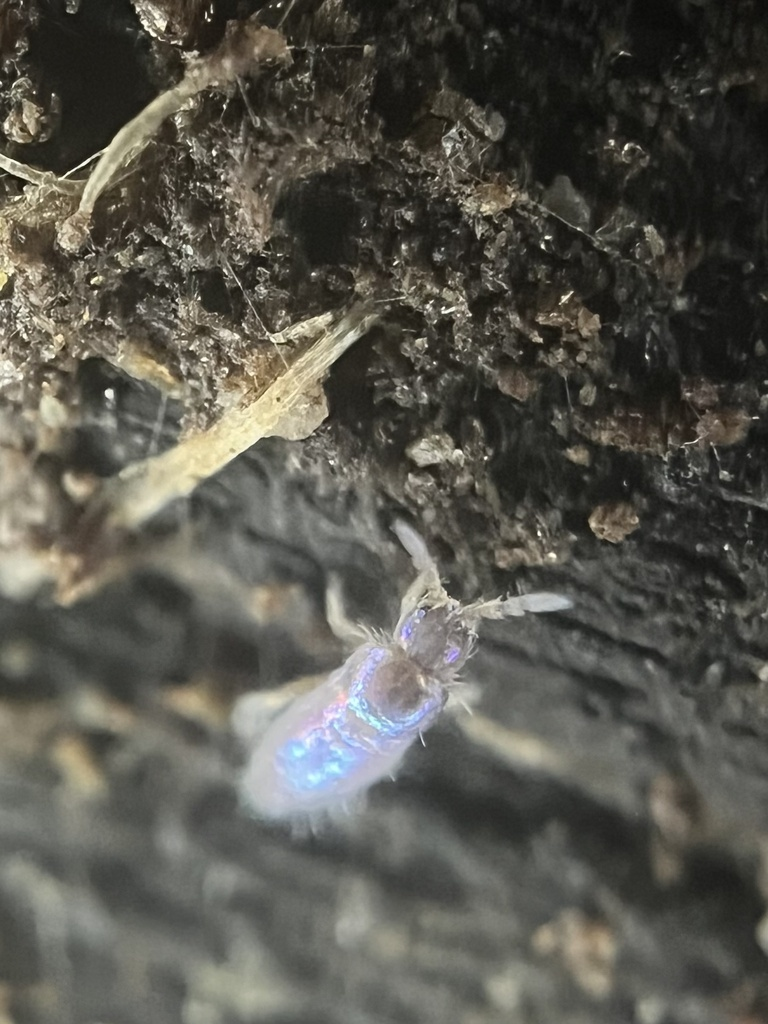
- 2. An example of a species with a less prominent hump back found in WA.

Scientific classification
- Kingdom: Animalia
- Phylum: Arthropoda
- Clade: Pancrustacea
- Class: Collembola
- Order: Entomobryomorpha
- Family: Entomobryidae
- Subfamily: Lepidocyrtinae
- Genus: Lepidocyrtus; Bourlet, 1839

= Lepidocyrtus =

Genus of arthropods

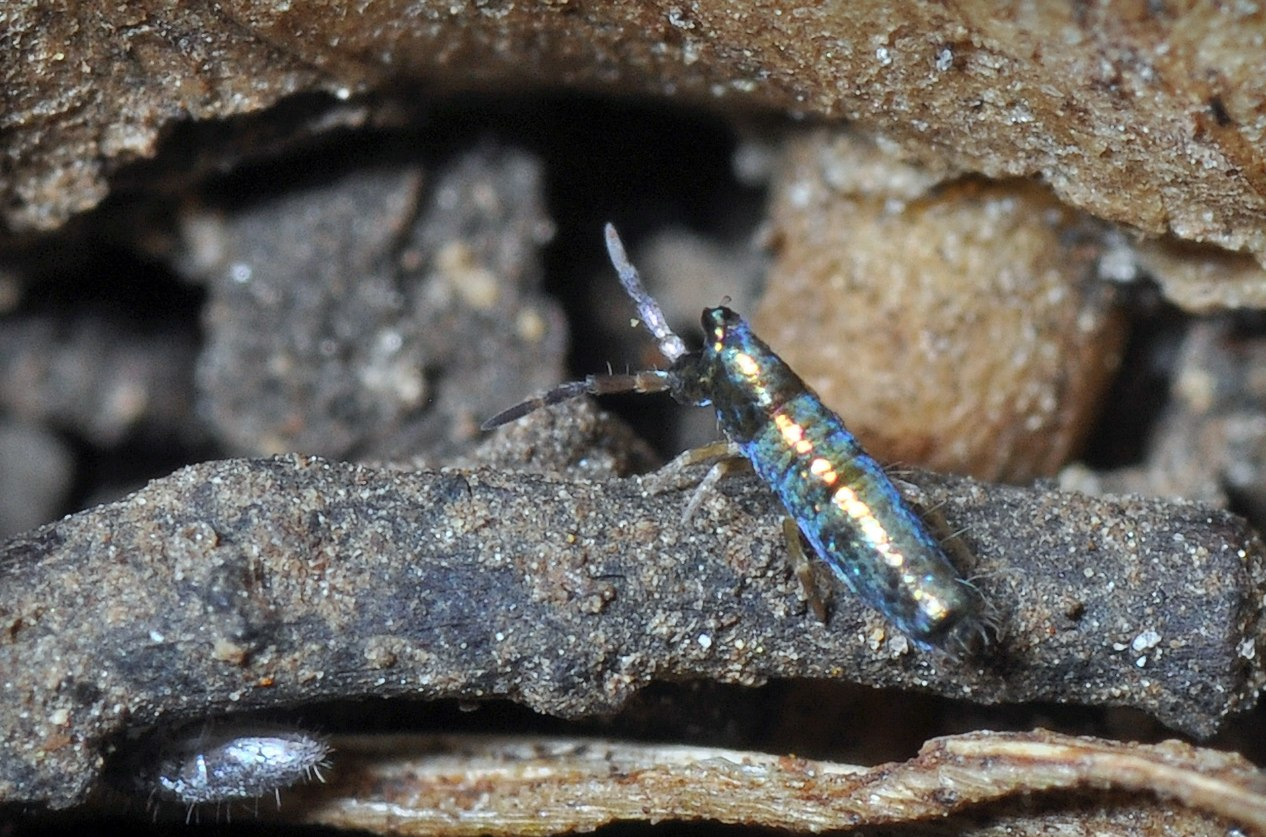
Lepidocyrtus paradoxus

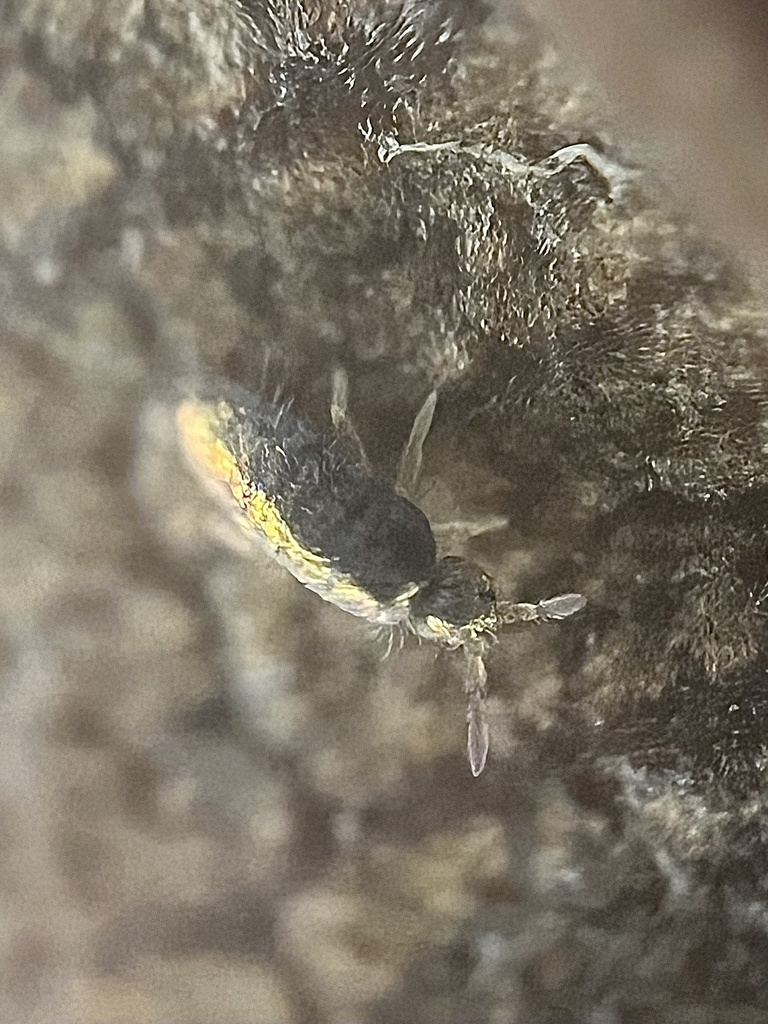
an unknown Lepidocyrtus from Washington State

Lepidocyrtus is a genus of slender springtails in the family Entomobryidae. There are at least 30 described species in Lepidocyrtus.

== Species ==
- Lepidocyrtus aho Christiansen & Bellinger, 1992
- Lepidocyrtus apo Christiansen & Bellinger, 1992
- Lepidocyrtus beaucatcheri (Wray, 1946)
- Lepidocyrtus cinereus Folsom, 1924
- Lepidocyrtus curvicollis Bourlet, 1839
- Lepidocyrtus cyaneus Tullberg, 1871
- Lepidocyrtus eeu Christiansen & Bellinger, 1992
- Lepidocyrtus fimicolus
- Lepidocyrtus finus Christiansen and Bellinger, 1980
- Lepidocyrtus floridensis Snider, 1967
- Lepidocyrtus hakea Christiansen & Bellinger, 1992
- Lepidocyrtus helenae Snider, 1967
- Lepidocyrtus heterophthalmus Carpenter, 1904
- Lepidocyrtus hirtus Christiansen and Bellinger, 1980
- Lepidocyrtus hukulii Christiansen & Bellinger, 1992
- Lepidocyrtus immaculatus Folsom, 1932
- Lepidocyrtus inornatus Folsom, 1932
- Lepidocyrtus kuakea Christiansen & Bellinger, 1992
- Lepidocyrtus lanuginosus (Gmelin, 1790)
- Lepidocyrtus lignorum (Fabricius, 1775)
- Lepidocyrtus mele Christiansen & Bellinger, 1992
- Lepidocyrtus metallicus Packard, 1873
- Lepidocyrtus neofasciatus Wray, 1948
- Lepidocyrtus olena Christiansen & Bellinger, 1992
- Lepidocyrtus pallidus Reuter, 1892
- Lepidocyrtus paradoxus Uzel, 1891
- Lepidocyrtus poko Christiansen & Bellinger, 1992
- Lepidocyrtus prope-fimicolus
- Lepidocyrtus purpureus Lubbock, 1873
- Lepidocyrtus ruber Schott, 1902
- Lepidocyrtus squamoornatus Stscherbakow, 1898
- Lepidocyrtus uku Christiansen & Bellinger, 1992
- Lepidocyrtus unifasciatus James, 1933
- Lepidocyrtus violaceus Fourcroy, 1785
