= Lepidocyrtus cinereus =

Scientific classification
- Domain: Eukaryota
- Kingdom: Animalia
- Phylum: Arthropoda
- Class: Collembola
- Order: Entomobryomorpha
- Family: Entomobryidae
- Genus: Lepidocyrtus
- Species: L. cinereus

Binomial name
- Lepidocyrtus cinereus Folsom, 1924

Synonyms
- Lepidocyrtus cyaneus cinereus Folsom, 1924

Species of springtail

Lepidocyrtus cinereus is a species of slender springtail in the family Entomobryidae.
