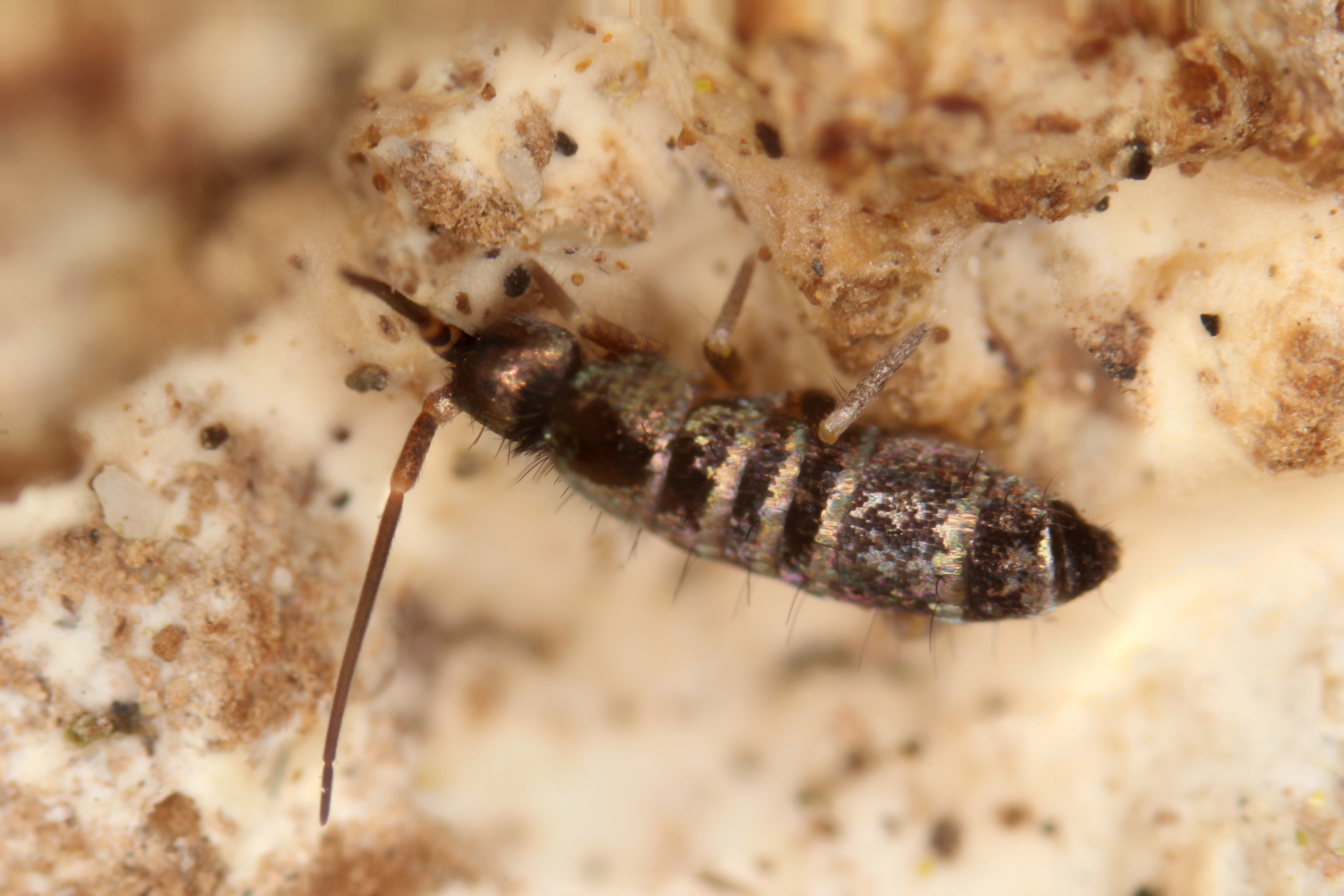

Scientific classification
- Domain: Eukaryota
- Kingdom: Animalia
- Phylum: Arthropoda
- Class: Collembola
- Order: Entomobryomorpha
- Family: Tomoceridae
- Genus: Tomocerus
- Species: T. vulgaris

Binomial name
- Tomocerus vulgaris (Tullberg, 1871)

= Tomocerus vulgaris =

Species of springtail

Tomocerus vulgaris is a species of elongate-bodied springtail in the family Tomoceridae. It is found in Europe.

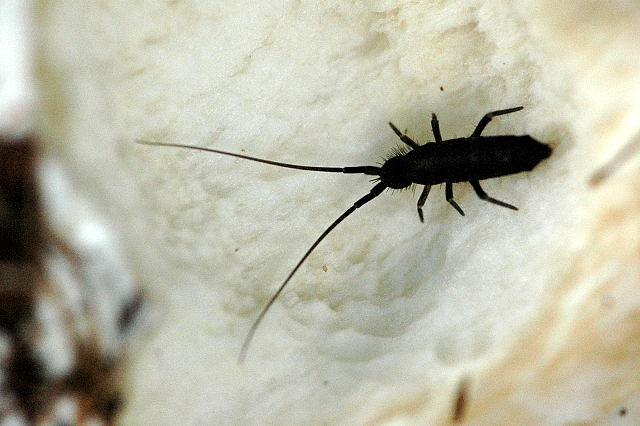
