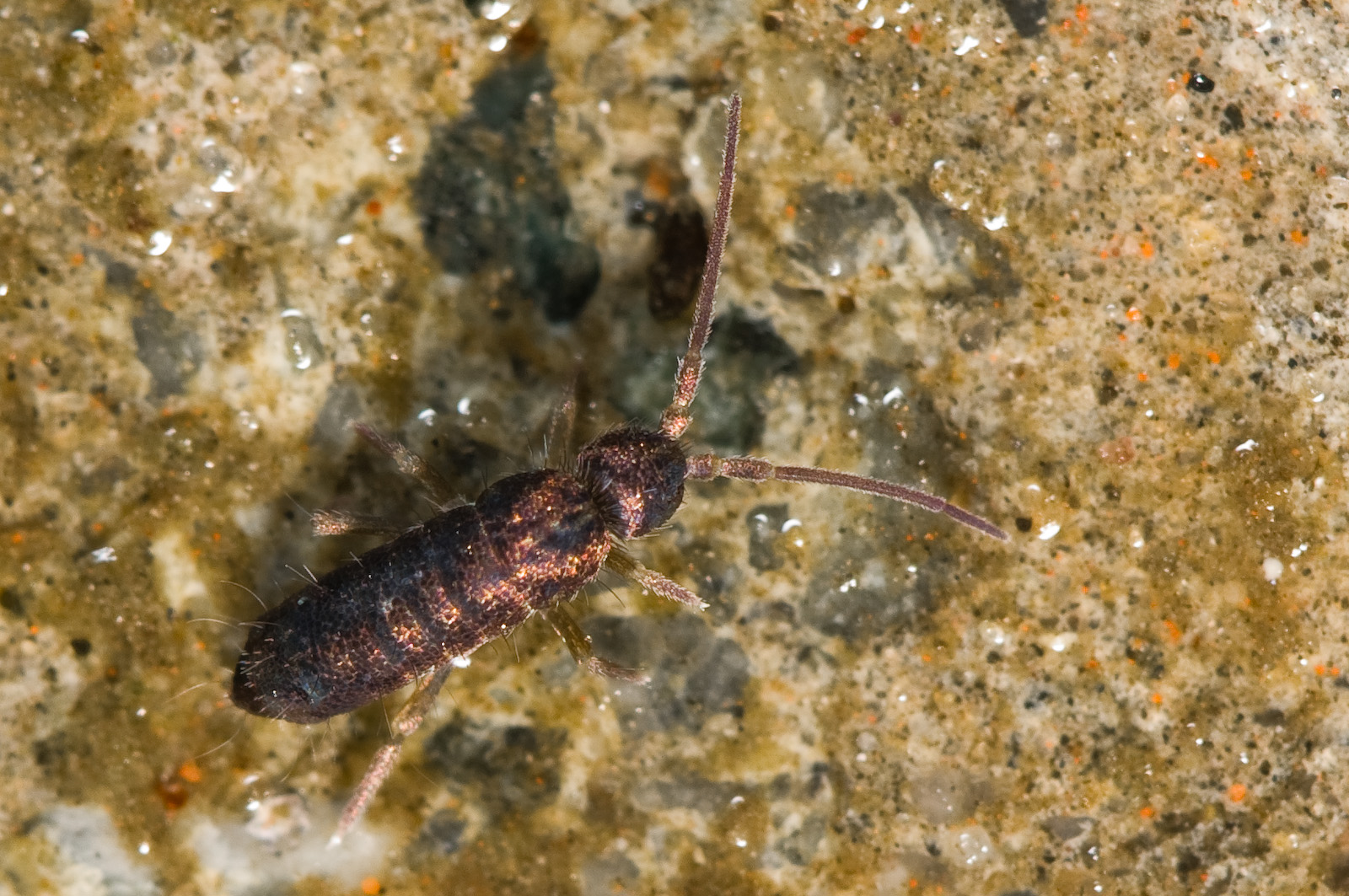
- Tomocerus minor

Scientific classification
- Domain: Eukaryota
- Kingdom: Animalia
- Phylum: Arthropoda
- Class: Collembola
- Order: Entomobryomorpha
- Family: Tomoceridae
- Genus: Tomocerus; Nicolet, 1841

= Tomocerus =

Genus of springtails

Tomocerus is a genus of springtails described by Nicolet in 1841.

== Species ==
- Tomocerus minor
- Tomocerus reductus
- Tomocerus vulgaris
