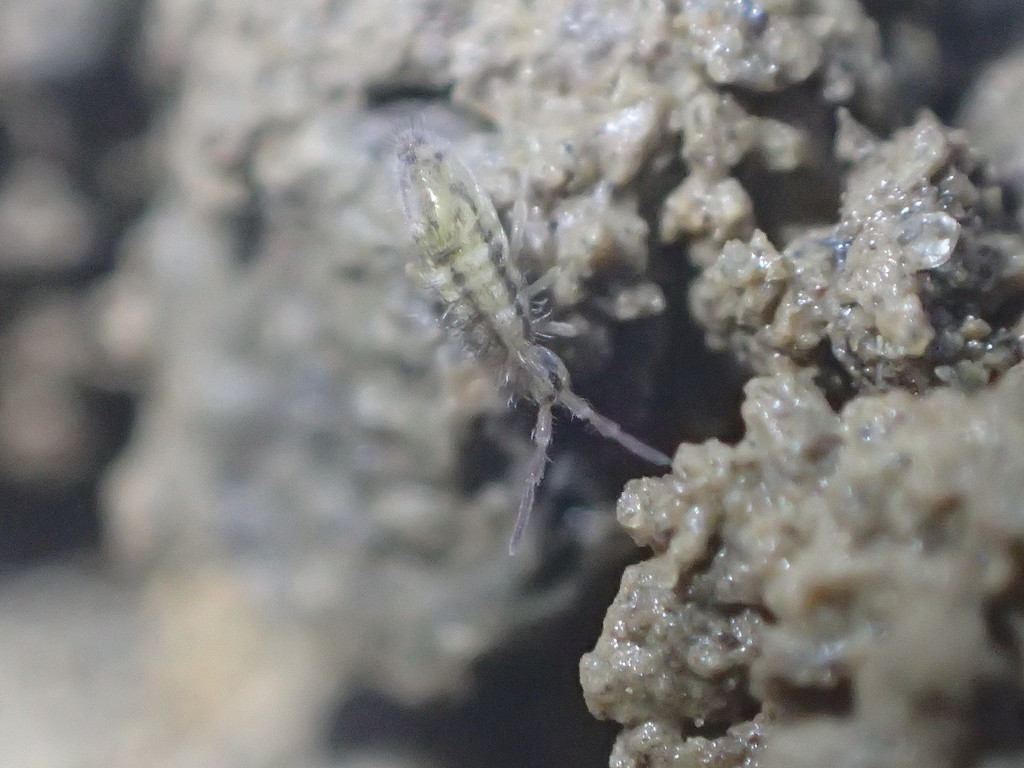
- Homidia socia

Scientific classification
- Domain: Eukaryota
- Kingdom: Animalia
- Phylum: Arthropoda
- Class: Collembola
- Order: Entomobryomorpha
- Family: Entomobryidae
- Genus: Homidia; Börner, 1906

Species
- See text

= Homidia =

Genus of springtails

Homidia is a genus of springtails belonging to the family Entomobryidae. Species include:

- Homidia allospila
- Homidia amethystina
- Homidia anhuiensis
- Homidia chosonica
- Homidia chrysothrix
- Homidia cingula
- Homidia emeiensis
- Homidia fascia
- Homidia flava
- Homidia flavonigra
- Homidia formosana
- Homidia fujiyamai
- Homidia glassa
- Homidia grisea
- Homidia haikea
- Homidia heugsanica
- Homidia hihiu
- Homidia hjesanica
- Homidia huashanensis
- Homidia insularis
- Homidia koreana
- Homidia laha
- Homidia latifolia
- Homidia leei
- Homidia mediaseta
- Homidia minuta
- Homidia munda
- Homidia nigra
- Homidia nigrocephala
- Homidia obscura
- Homidia pentachaeta
- Homidia phjongjangica
- Homidia polyseta
- Homidia qimenensis
- Homidia sauteri
- Homidia similis
- Homidia sinensis
- Homidia socia
- Homidia speciosa
- Homidia subcingula
- Homidia tiantaiensis
- Homidia tibetensis
- Homidia transitoria
- Homidia vigintiseta
- Homidia ziguiensis
