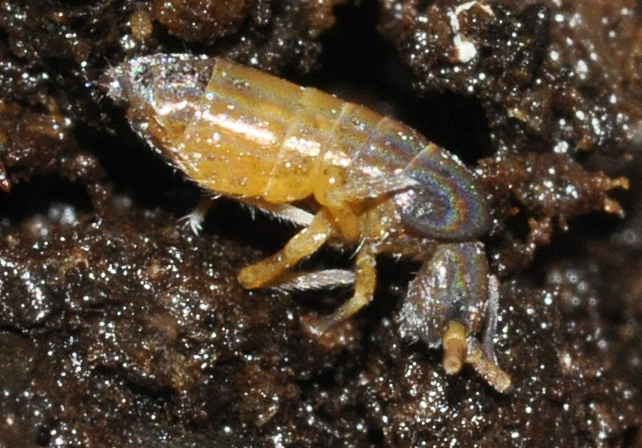

Scientific classification
- Kingdom: Animalia
- Phylum: Arthropoda
- Class: Collembola
- Order: Entomobryomorpha
- Family: Entomobryidae
- Genus: Lepidocyrtus
- Species: L. lignorum

Binomial name
- Lepidocyrtus lignorum (Fabricius, 1775)

= Lepidocyrtus lignorum =

Species of springtail

Lepidocyrtus lignorum is a species of slender springtail in the family Entomobryidae. It is found in Europe.

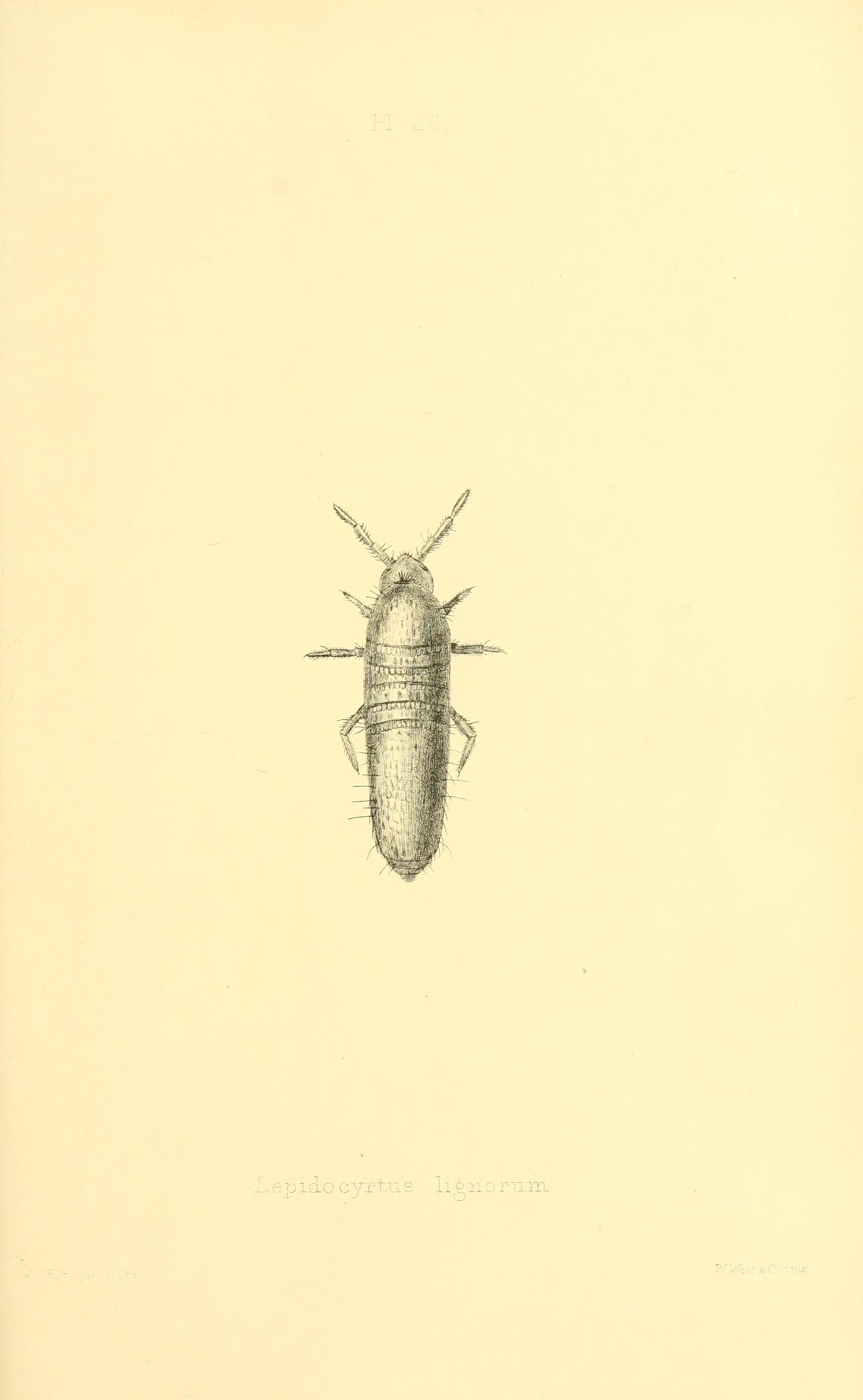
Illustrations of L. lignorum.
