= Appalachia arcana =

Conservation status
- Vulnerable (IUCN 2.3)

Scientific classification
- Kingdom: Animalia
- Phylum: Arthropoda
- Class: Insecta
- Order: Orthoptera
- Suborder: Caelifera
- Family: Acrididae
- Tribe: Podismini
- Genus: Appalachia
- Species: A. arcana

Binomial name
- Appalachia arcana Hubbell & Cantrall, 1938

Synonyms
- Appalachia arcena Hubbell & Cantrall, 1938 [orth. error]

Species of grasshopper

Appalachia arcana is a species of grasshopper in the family Acrididae. It is known by the common names Michigan bog grasshopper and secretive locust. It is the only grasshopper that is endemic to Michigan in the United States.

This short-winged grasshopper does not sing or fly. The male is brownish gray with a stripe down its back, and both sexes have femora with red undersides. This species is often found in sphagnum bogs surrounded by jack pine trees. Breeding occurs in September.
