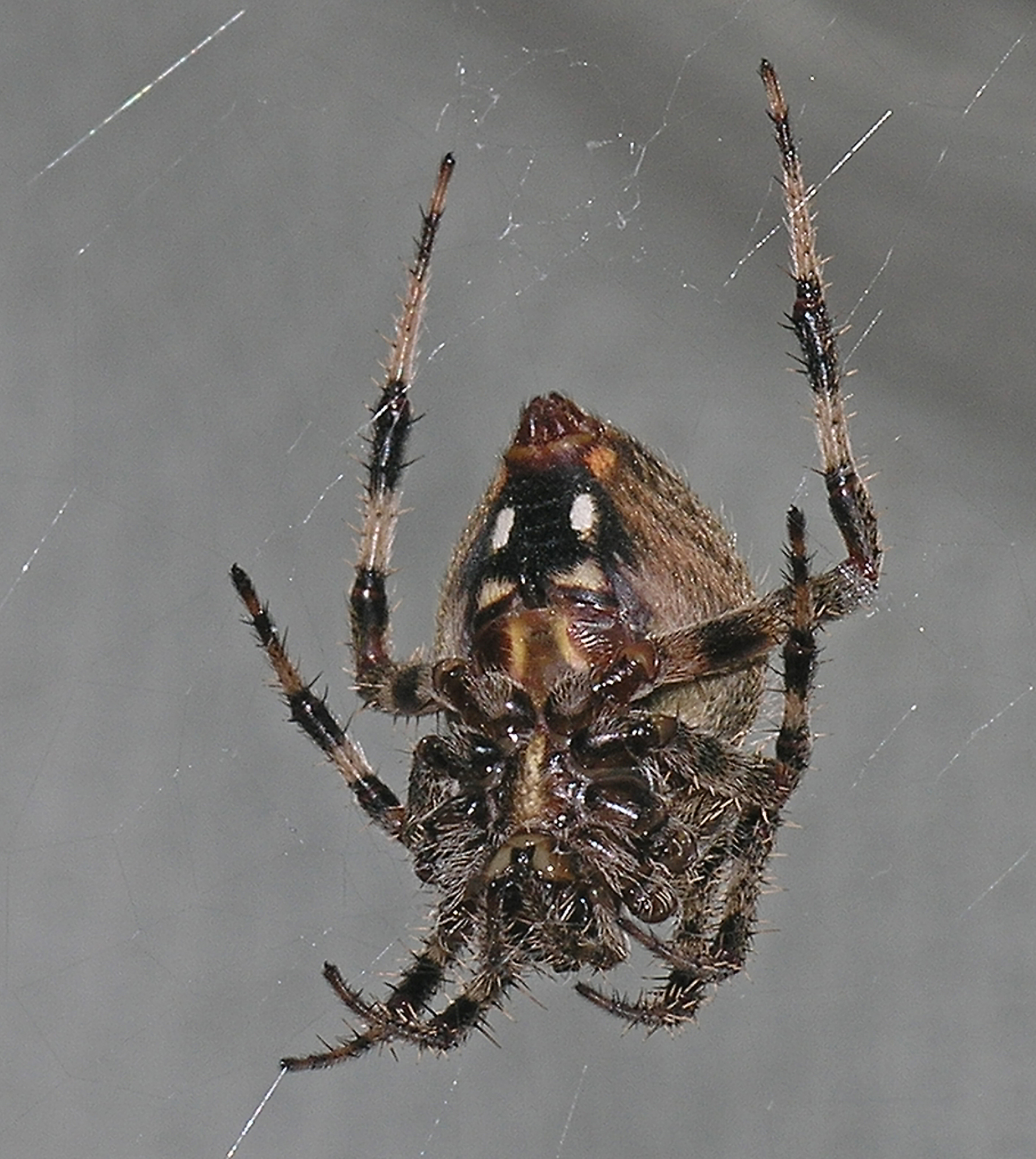
- Ventral view
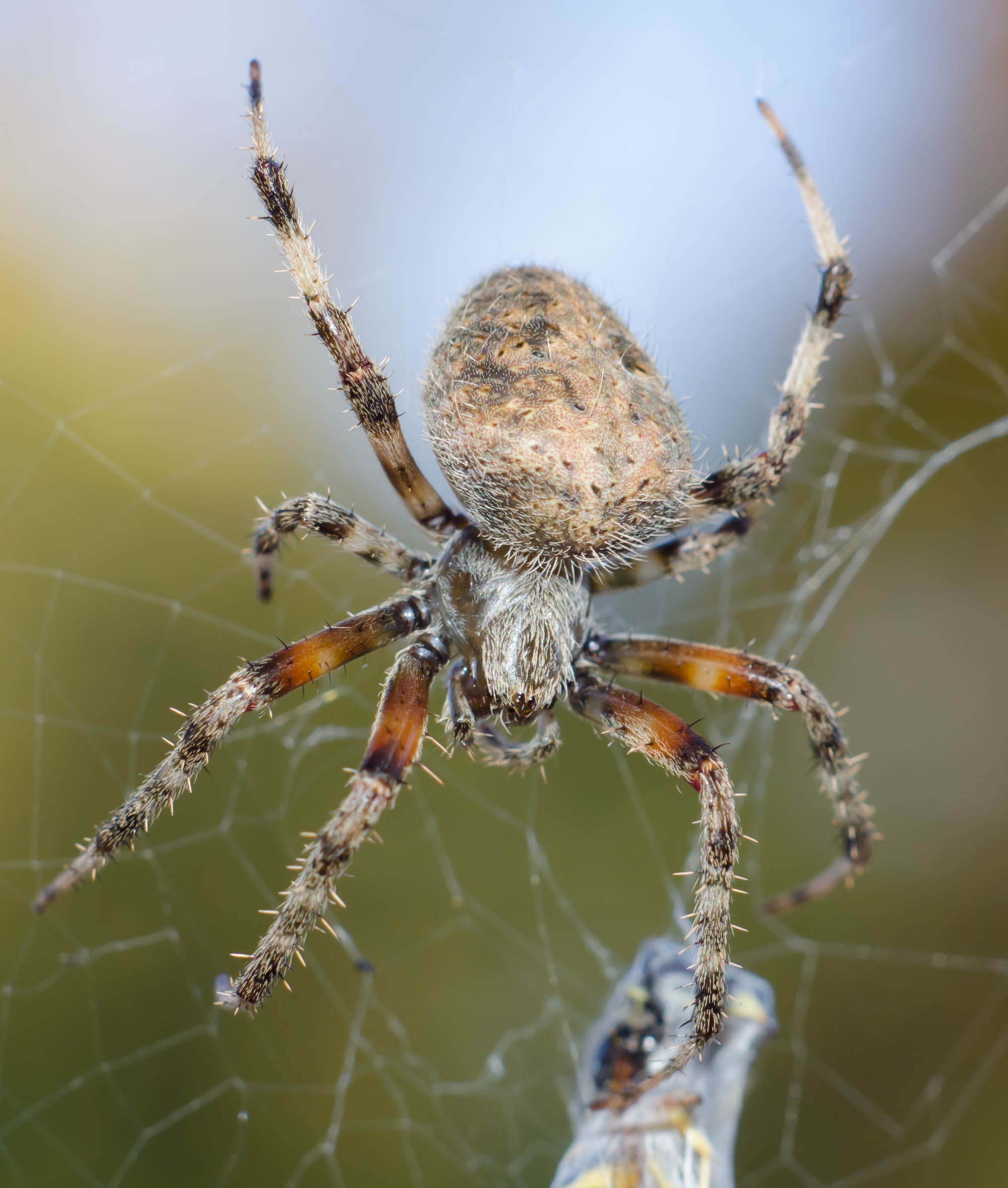
- Dorsal view

Scientific classification
- Kingdom: Animalia
- Phylum: Arthropoda
- Subphylum: Chelicerata
- Class: Arachnida
- Order: Araneae
- Infraorder: Araneomorphae
- Family: Araneidae
- Genus: Neoscona
- Species: N. crucifera

Binomial name
- Neoscona crucifera (Lucas, 1839)

= Neoscona crucifera =

Species of spider

Neoscona crucifera is an orb-weaver spider in the family Araneidae. It is found in the United States from Maine to Florida in the east, to Minnesota in the Midwest, to Arizona in the southwest, southern California coastal communities and in Mexico also found in India. Its common names include Hentz orbweaver (after Nicholas Marcellus Hentz), spotted orbweaver, and barn spider. The name "barn spider" is also commonly used for a different spider, Araneus cavaticus; its appearance is similar to a Neoscona nautica.

Generally nocturnal, females may become diurnal in the fall. Females are about 9.5–19 millimeters (0.37–0.75 in) long, while males are somewhat smaller. The upper surface of the abdomen is brown and hairy. The legs display alternating light and dark brown bands. The undersurface of the abdomen is black, with two white spots.

This species is relatively variable in color and sometimes pattern, but is most commonly seen sporting a rusty-red or golden orange color. The orb-shaped web is very large and is often constructed on buildings and other man-made structures, often several feet above ground, especially near outdoor lights. This species is most conspicuous in late summer and early fall.

== Webs ==
Webs are constructed exclusively by the females. These webs are wheel-shaped, and the orb part of the web may be nearly 2 feet (0.61 m) in diameter. These webs are vertically suspended on plants or other structures, often near lights as these attract various flying insects which make up their diet.

Female Neoscona crucifera build new webs each night and consume them each morning, recycling the nutrients for the next web. Spiders in areas with high prey density have been found to produce webs of smaller radii than those in low prey density areas. The spider uses vibrations from the web to locate trapped prey, which is then wrapped in silk and consumed.

== Diet ==
Moths and crane flies make up the primary diet of Neoscona crucifera, although they will feed on a variety of other insects such as grasshoppers, bees and beetles that may have become trapped in their webs.

== Eggs ==
The eggsac consists of fluffy yellow threads in a rolled leaf over a lenticular or spherical egg mass 5–12 mm (0.20–0.47 in) in diameter, which may contain up to 1,000 eggs. Juveniles are frequently preyed upon by mud daubers.

== Venom ==
This species will bite if provoked, but its venom is not dangerous to humans.

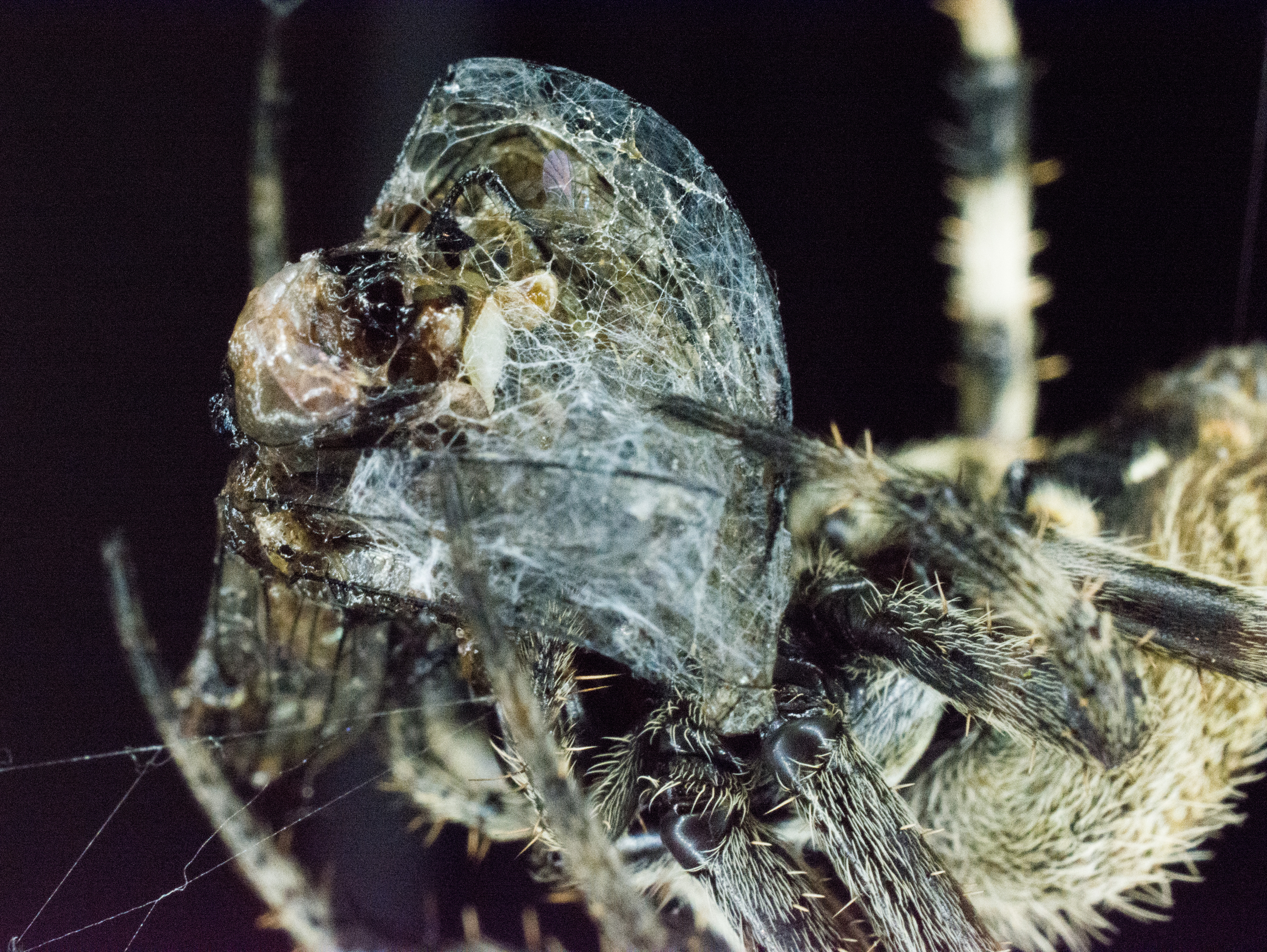
With an enrobed insect

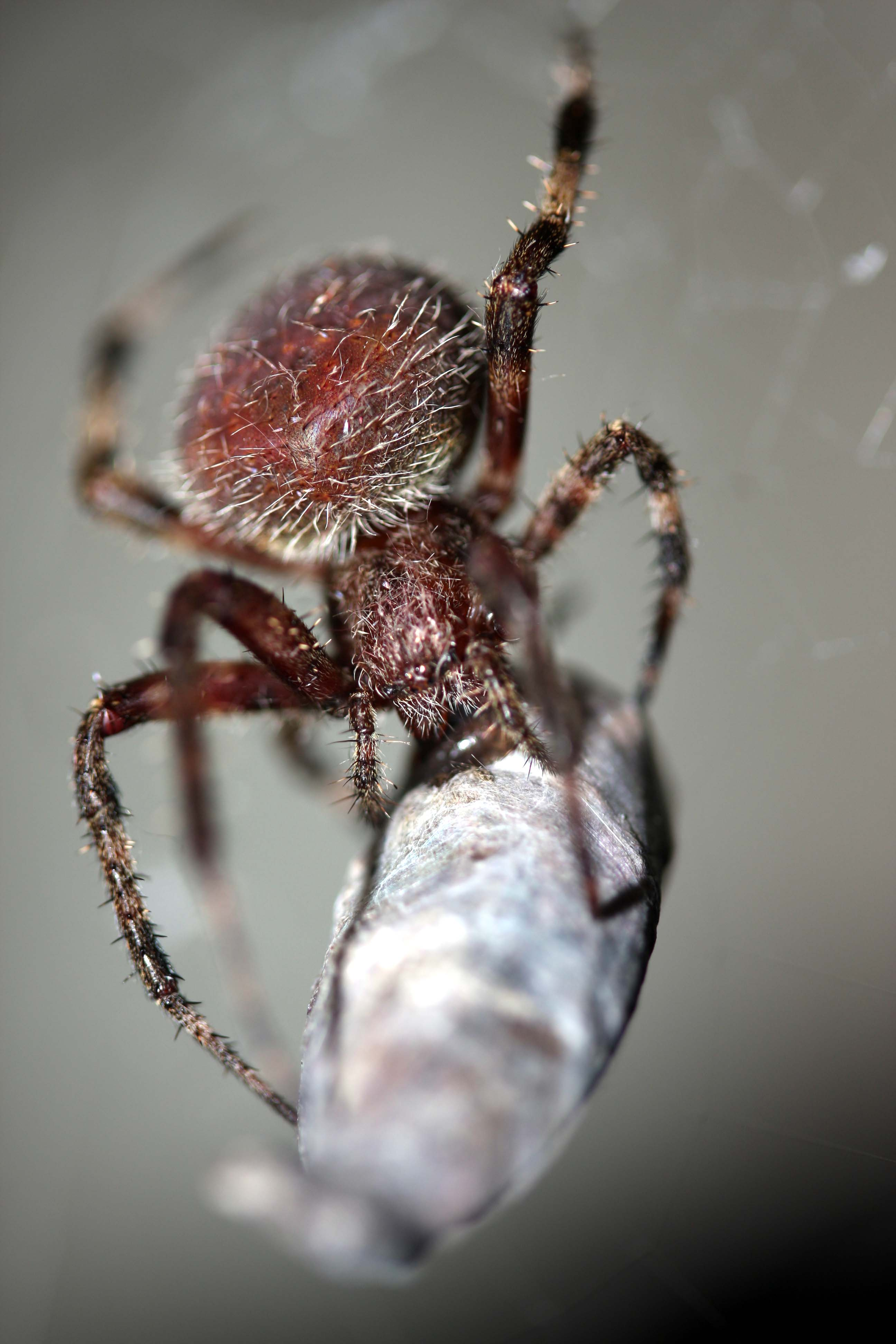
Feeding on enrobed prey

== Synonyms ==
Neoscona crucifera has also been known by a number of taxonomic synonyms.

- Aranea crucifera albimaculata Strand, 1908
- Epeira crucifera Keyserling, 1864
- Epeira domiciliorum Emerton, 1884
- Epeira hentzii Keyserling 1864
- Epeira lentiginosa Blackwall 1862
- Neoscona arkansa Chamberlin & Ivie, 1942
- Neoscona benjamina Comstock 1940
- Neoscona hentzi Kaston 1977
- Neoscona nebraskensis Chamberlin & Ivie, 1942
- Neoscona sacra Chamberlin & Ivie, 1944
