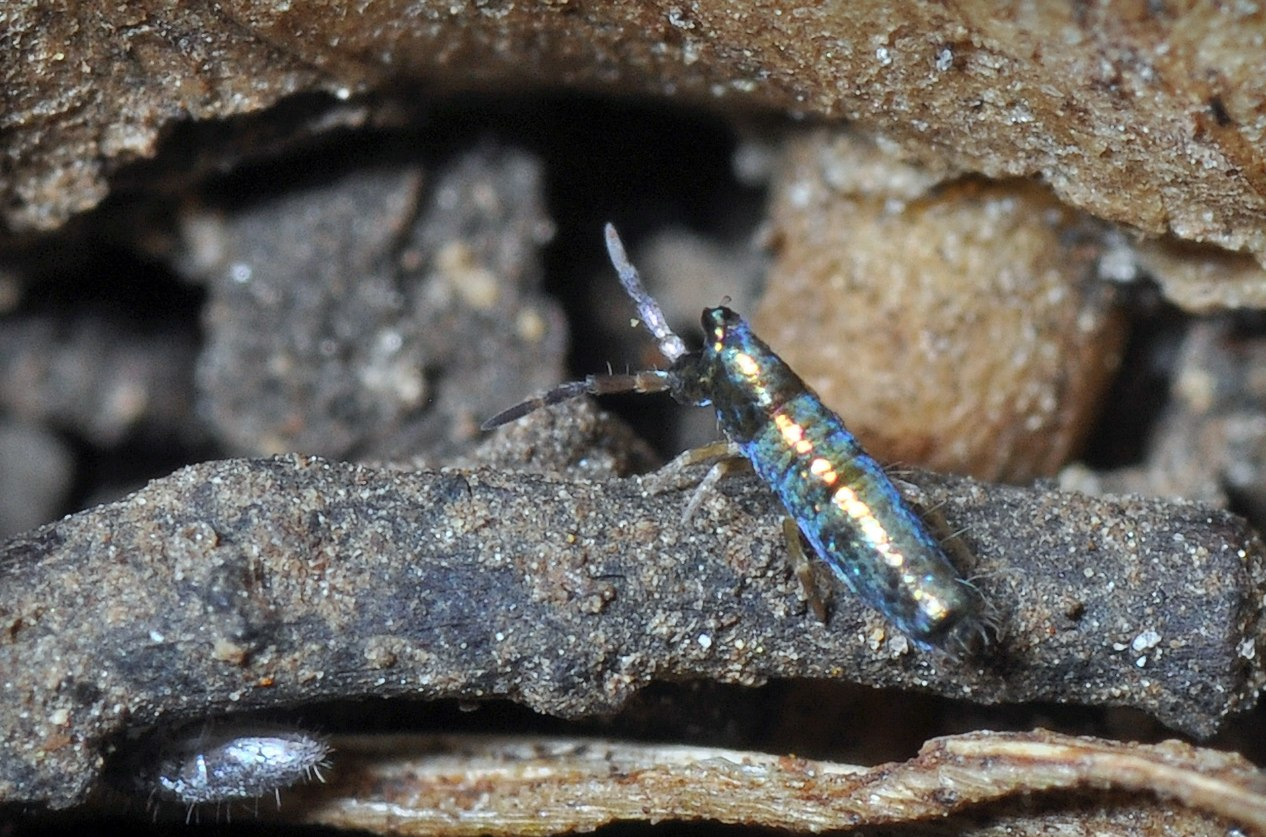

Scientific classification
- Domain: Eukaryota
- Kingdom: Animalia
- Phylum: Arthropoda
- Class: Collembola
- Order: Entomobryomorpha
- Family: Entomobryidae
- Genus: Lepidocyrtus
- Species: L. paradoxus

Binomial name
- Lepidocyrtus paradoxus Uzel, 1891

Synonyms
- Lepidocyrtus cephalopurpureus Harvey, 1894; Lepidocyrtus christianseni Goto, 1953; Paidium cucullatum Koch, 1840

= Lepidocyrtus paradoxus =

Species of springtail

Lepidocyrtus paradoxus is a species of slender springtail in the family Entomobryidae. It is found in Europe.
