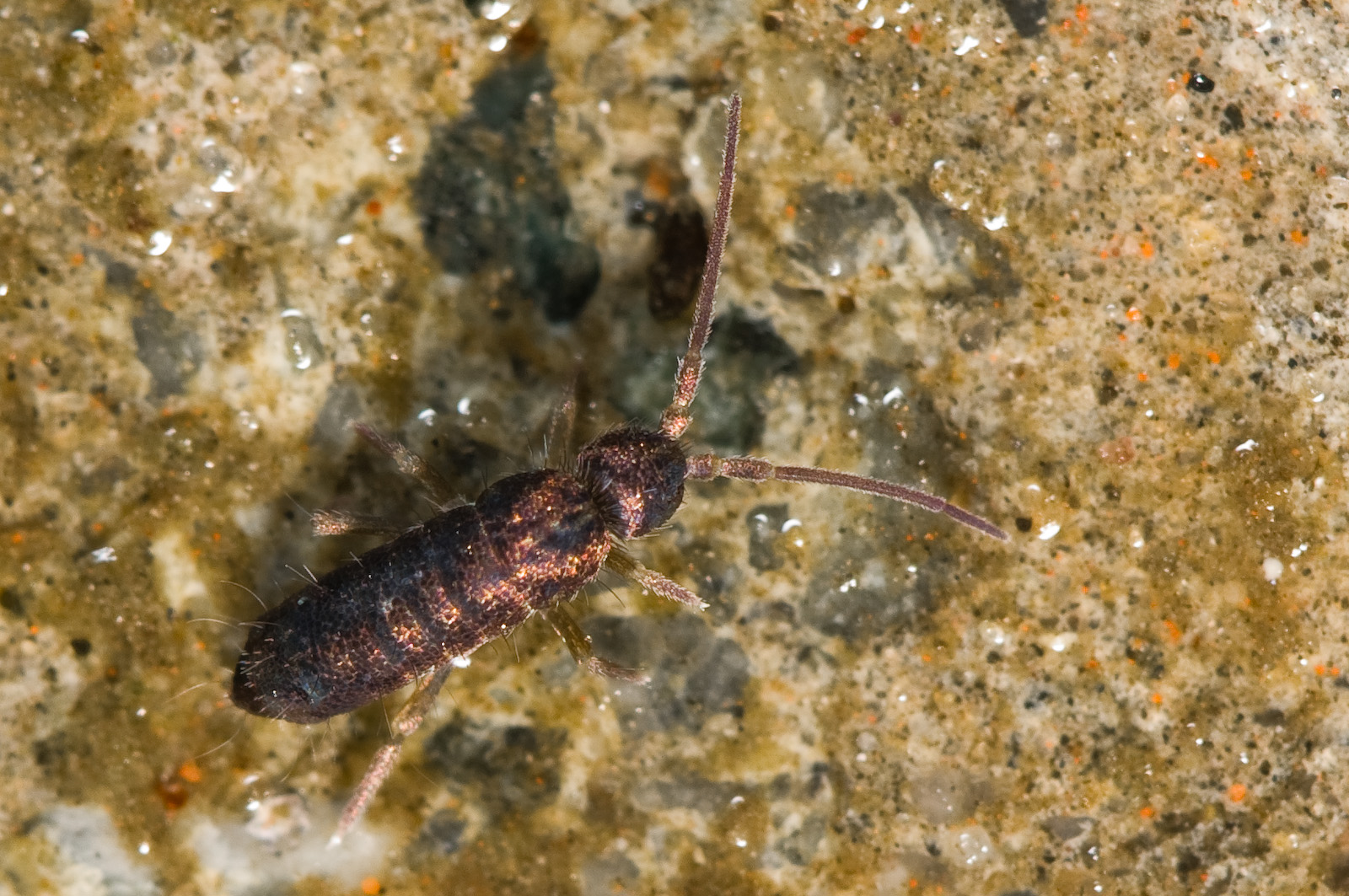

Scientific classification
- Domain: Eukaryota
- Kingdom: Animalia
- Phylum: Arthropoda
- Class: Collembola
- Order: Entomobryomorpha
- Family: Tomoceridae
- Genus: Tomocerus
- Species: T. minor

Binomial name
- Tomocerus minor (Lubbock, 1862)

= Tomocerus minor =

Species of springtail

Tomocerus minor is a species of springtail in the family Tomoceridae. It is widespread from the Arctic to Europe, Western and Central Asia down to the Sino-Japanese, Northern and Pacific North America, Hawaii, the Caribbean mainland and New Zealand.

Tomocerus minor can be up to 4.5 millimetres (0.18 in) long, with antennae that are shorter than the body and a characteristic uniform bluish iridisation.
