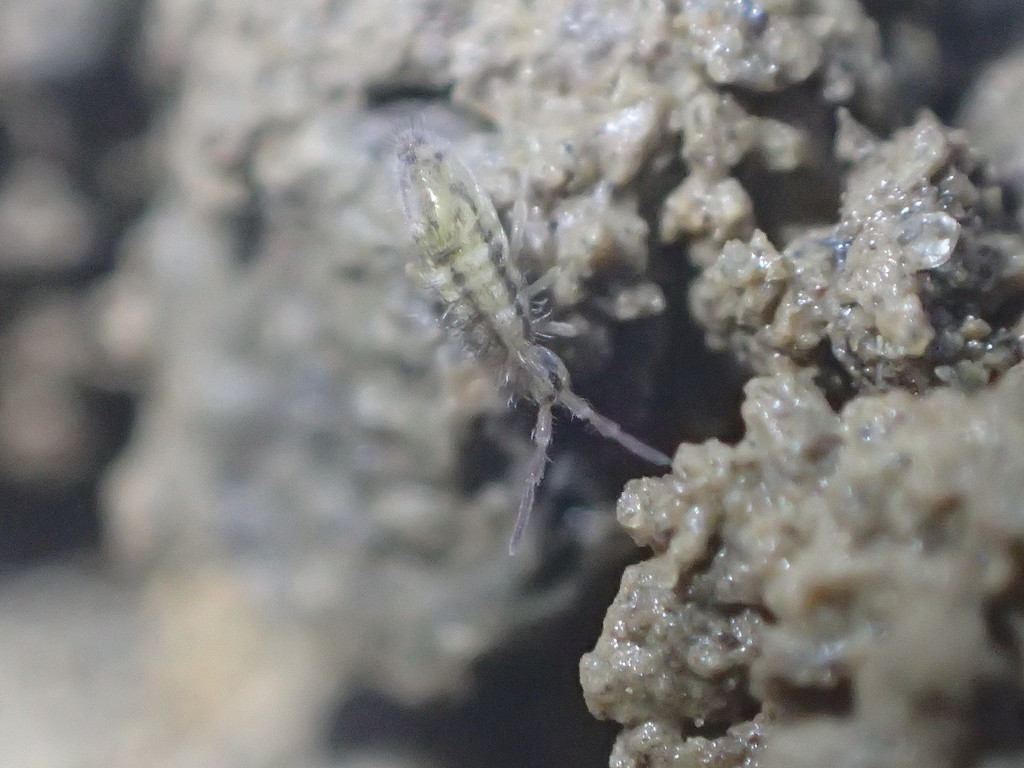

Scientific classification
- Domain: Eukaryota
- Kingdom: Animalia
- Phylum: Arthropoda
- Class: Collembola
- Order: Entomobryomorpha
- Family: Entomobryidae
- Genus: Homidia
- Species: H. socia

Binomial name
- Homidia socia Denis, 1929

= Homidia socia =

Species of springtail

Homidia socia is a species of slender springtail in the family Entomobryidae.
