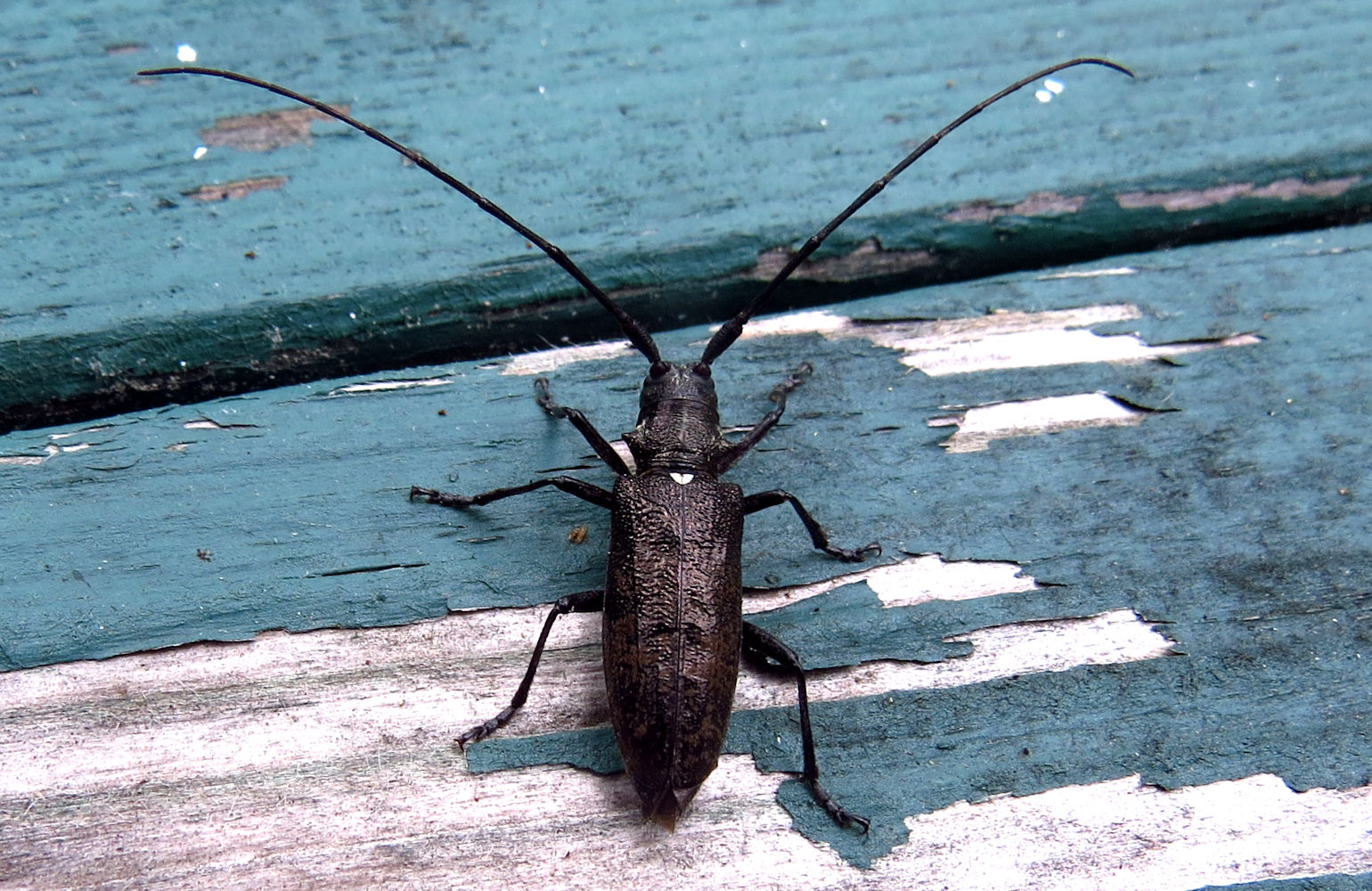
- Monochamus scutellatus scutellatus

Scientific classification
- Kingdom: Animalia
- Phylum: Arthropoda
- Clade: Pancrustacea
- Class: Insecta
- Order: Coleoptera
- Suborder: Polyphaga
- Infraorder: Cucujiformia
- Family: Cerambycidae
- Genus: Monochamus
- Species: M. scutellatus

Binomial name
- Monochamus scutellatus (Say, 1824)

Subspecies
- M. s. oregonensis; M. s. scutellatus

= Monochamus scutellatus =

Species of beetle

Monochamus scutellatus, commonly known as the white-spotted sawyer or spruce sawyer or spruce bug or a hair-eater, is a common wood-boring beetle found throughout North America. It is a species native to North America.

Adults are large-bodied and black, with very long antennae; in males, they can be up to twice the body length, but in females they are only slightly longer than body length. Both sexes have a white spot on the base of the wings, and may have white spots covering the wings. Both males and females also have a spine on the side of the prothorax. Most research done on M. scutellatus focuses on their relationship with burned forests and the logging industry, with interest also being shown in their mating behaviours.

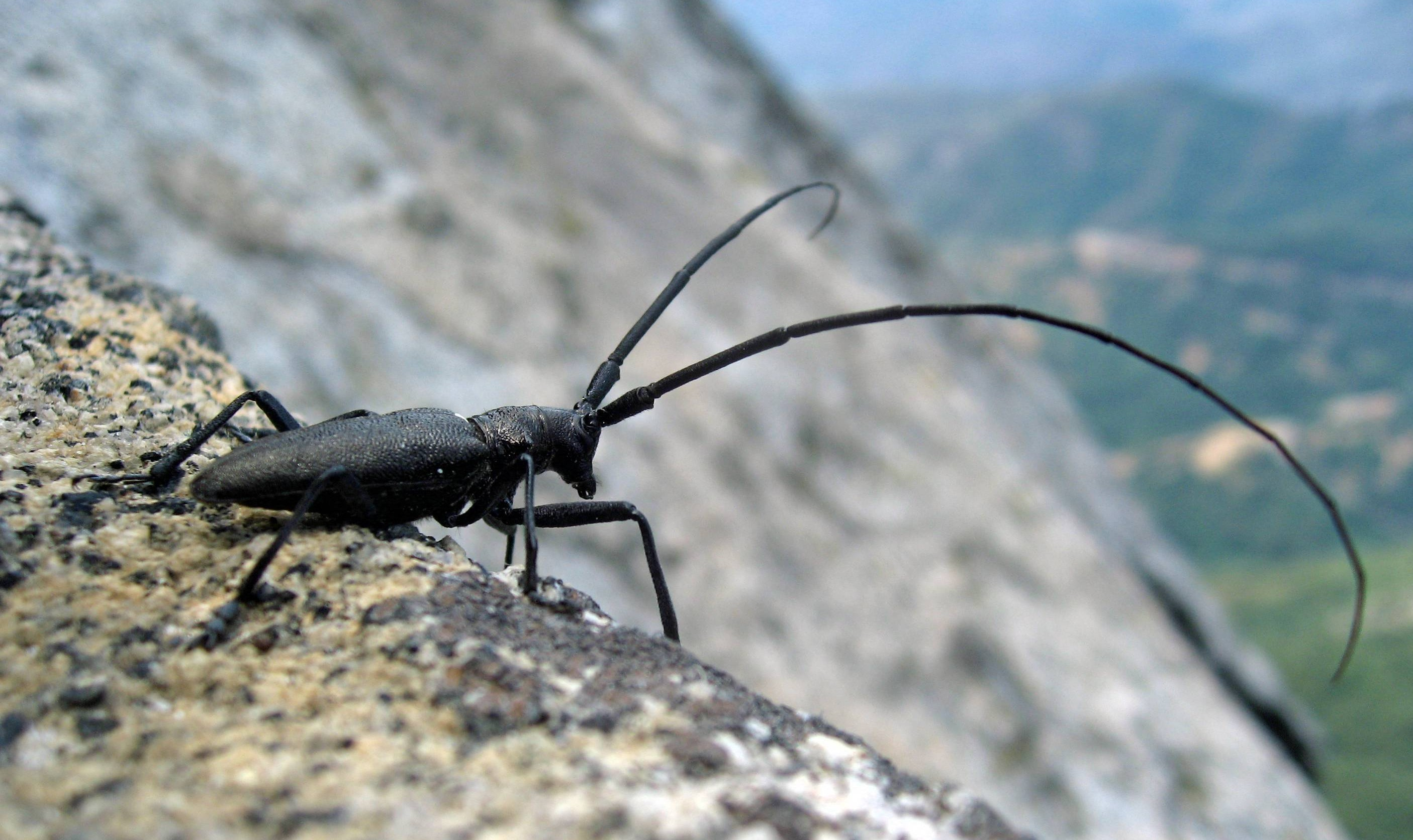
Monochamus scutellatus oregonensis

== Life history ==
Adults feed preferentially on members of the pine and spruce families for up to seven days after emerging between mid-June and mid-August. After mating, females chew small egg niches into dead or dying trees or logs, into which they deposit one egg each. Both sexes mate repeatedly with different partners, and females have been found to lay between 15 and 20 eggs on average per lifetime. Once the larvae hatch, they burrow into the phloem and to the cambium, where they continue to feed until emergence. Life cycles ranging from one to four years have been recorded in different areas and specific habitats. About one week after pupae formation, adults emerge from their larval log by chewing through the bark.

== Habitat ==
In boreal forests where fire has altered the landscape, changes come to plant communities and carbon flux. This change opens up opportunities for immigrant species to move into a competitor-free habitat. Several groups of insects, including the genus Monochamus, have become adapted to exploit these conditions. M. scutellatus is a saproxylic insect, which means that at least part of its life cycle is dependent on either dead or dying wood. For these beetles to successfully colonize a new habitat, such as an area that has been burned by forest fire, it must be of high enough quality and in close enough range.

Studies have shown that several Monochamus species use the pheromones of bark beetles as kairomones to find suitable host habitats quickly and efficiently, enabling them to devote time and energy to other activities. In the cases of succession after fires, the abundance of M. scutellatus is positively correlated with the severity of the fire, the abundance and size of the burned trees, and the distance between burned and unburned land. However, more larvae tend to be found in areas with a larger percentage of unburned forest within 500 metres, which may be related to the dietary requirements of the adult beetles.

Adult females seem to prefer to lay their eggs in trees with thick bark and phloem, and consequently trees with diameters greater than 8–10 centimetres. These trees are more able to inhibit water loss during fires, preserving the quality preferred by females.

== Relationship with the logging industry ==
M. scutellatus contributes to the ecology of the forest and may impact logging activities. Wood-boring insects can degrade the wood aesthetically by boring holes, and also indirectly as vectors for fungi and nematodes which can cause structural damage.

Allison et al. extrapolated information from one mill in southern British Columbia to suggest that wood-boring insects could cause an annual loss of US$43.6 million per year in British Columbia. On the other hand, the logging industry also negatively impacts beetle populations. Because saproxylic insects rely on dead or dying wood to complete their life cycles, there must be constant migration between habitats as resources decompose and new areas for colonization appear.

As such, if forest management interferes in natural succession patterns, by methods such as clearfelling, they may induce a gap in habitat continuity which can cause localized extinction of a species. With the introduction of salvage logging, concerns have been raised about the long-term effects that this practice can have on ecosystems. Salvage logging can directly kill both adult beetles and their larvae by clearing land soon after forest fires. Delaying this practice for 3–4 years, enough time for populations to complete a life cycle, would help support the persistence of these saproxylic insects.

The presence of M. scutellatus has been shown to be beneficial in nutrient cycling by affecting microbial activity, the amount of available nitrogen, and the germination of post-fire colonizing flora. Therefore, although wood-boring beetles including M. scutellatus are considered pests of the logging industry, post-fire management strategies should not ignore their importance as nutrient cyclers and facilitators of plant growth.

== Reproduction and mate choice ==
As with many other insects, both intraspecies and interspecies competition occurs in M. scutellatus over resources. Hughes and Hughes performed experiments to test the results of asymmetric contests of M. scutellatus and M. notatus, the eastern pine sawyer. They found that in M. scutellatus, females laid eggs that were fertilized by the male with whom they were currently sharing a pair-bond with, and the certainty of paternity decreases once the pair-bond is over. Consequently, females are the most valuable resource that males compete over.

As for the females, the majority of their inter- and intraspecies competition was over oviposition holes. Female M. scutellatus individuals often spend over 20 minutes using their mandibles to chew oviposition holes in the bark of trees, which makes a very loud noise and incurs substantial risk of detection by predators. Therefore, it is greatly advantageous for females to steal holes chewed by other females to save time and risk.

The study found that both within and between species, contests between larger resource holders and smaller challengers usually do not escalate and the resource holder retains their territory, but contests between smaller resource holders and larger challengers are more likely to escalate to fighting with the pro- and mesolegs and biting of the legs and antennae. This is likely because Monochamus species have large, strong mandibles which are capable of biting off limbs or antennae, and escalated competitions are usually not worth the risk.

M. scutellatus displays resource-defence polygyny, a mating system in which males defend necessary resources that females require for reproduction. Resources in this case refer to the quality of tree trunk that the male has won; females prefer basal trunk regions with a large diameter. Females then choose mates mainly on the basis of their resources, but when resources are equal, Hughes and Hughes observed that they choose larger males preferentially. Although it has not been proven that large body size is inherited by offspring, it still may be an indicator of fitness and quality.
