= Eudonia mawsoni =

Scientific classification
- Kingdom: Animalia
- Phylum: Arthropoda
- Class: Insecta
- Order: Lepidoptera
- Family: Crambidae
- Genus: Eudonia
- Species: E. mawsoni

Binomial name
- Eudonia mawsoni (Womersley & Tindale, 1937)

Synonyms
- Scoparia mawsoni Womersley and Tindale, 1937

Species of moth

Eudonia mawsoni is a species of moth of the family Crambidae described by Herbert Womersley and Norman Tindale in 1937. It is the only moth breeding on Macquarie Island. It is considered endemic to the island but may be conspecific with Eudonia psammitis, found in New Zealand. The wingspan is 21.2–26.7 mm for males and 18.6–24.8 mm for females.

The larvae feed mainly on mosses and have been found from sea level to 370m; adults have been found from sea level to the summit of Mount Hamilton (410m), the highest peak of Macquarie Island.
