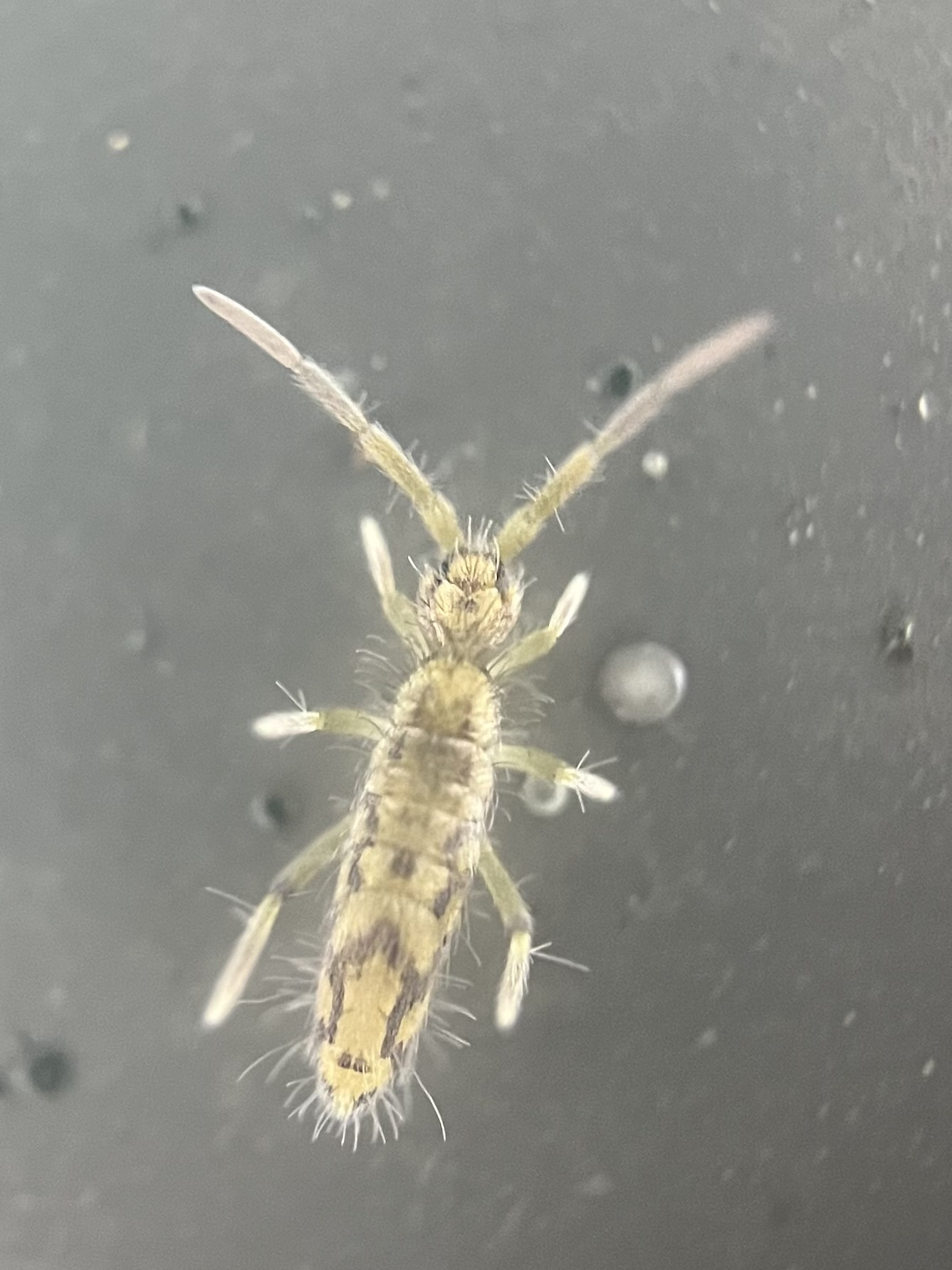

Scientific classification
- Kingdom: Animalia
- Phylum: Arthropoda
- Clade: Pancrustacea
- Class: Collembola
- Order: Entomobryomorpha
- Family: Entomobryidae
- Genus: Entomobrya
- Species: E. katzi

Binomial name
- Entomobrya katzi Jordana & Baquero, 2022

= Entomobrya katzi =

Species of springtail

Entomobrya katzi is a species of springtail in the genus Entomobrya native to North America.

== Etymology ==
The specific name katzi refers to Aron Katz, a researcher who initially captured the type specimens and assigned them to the species Entomobrya intermedia, otherwise known from Europe.

== Description ==
Entomobrya katzi is yellow in color with dark pigmentation that forms two broken stripes along the thorax and abdomen. It also bears a W-shaped marking on the fourth abdominal segment.
