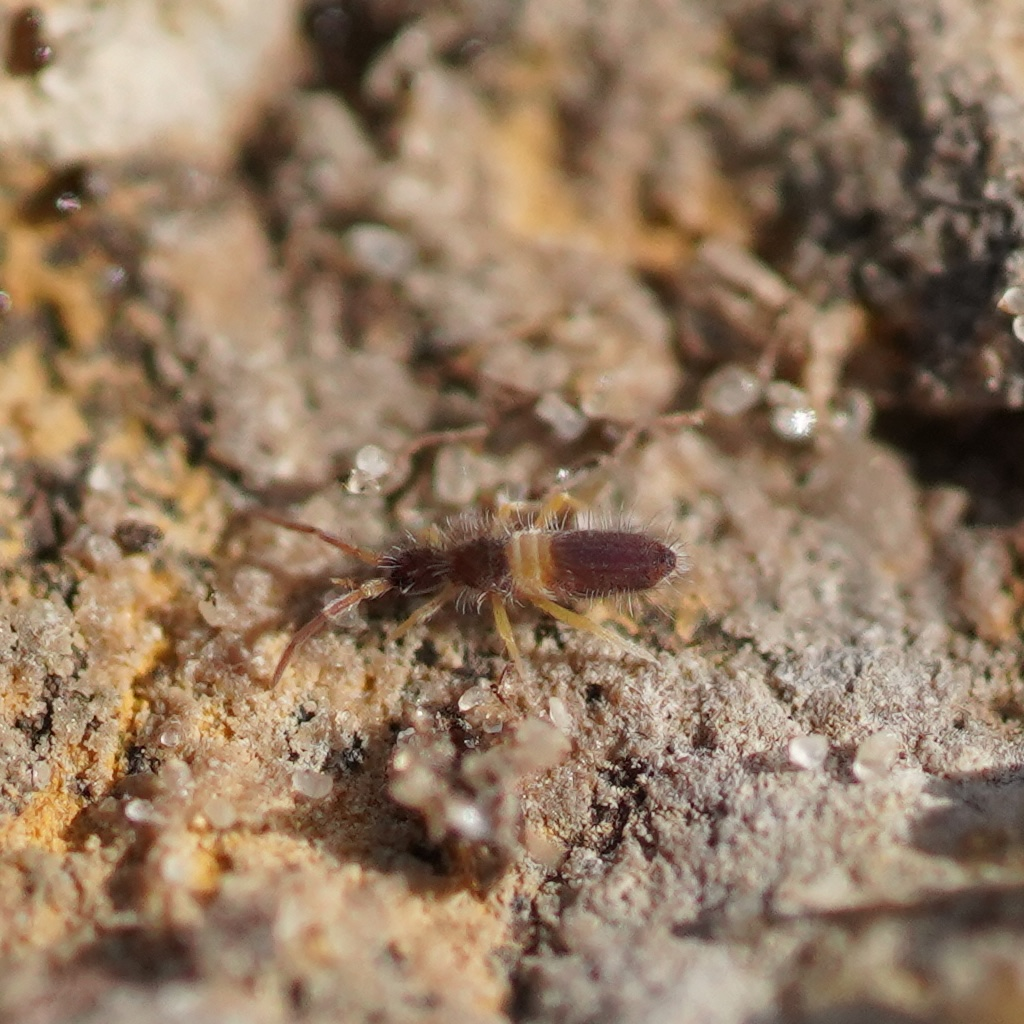

Scientific classification
- Kingdom: Animalia
- Phylum: Arthropoda
- Class: Collembola
- Order: Entomobryomorpha
- Family: Entomobryidae
- Genus: Entomobrya
- Species: E. bicolor

Binomial name
- Entomobrya bicolor Guthrie, 1903

= Entomobrya bicolor =

Species of springtail

Entomobrya bicolor is a species of slender springtails in the family Entomobryidae.

== Description ==
Entomobrya bicolor has a long, cylindrical body covered in many irregularly-placed hairlike bristles, called setae. It has a distinctive color pattern, with mature individuals having a dark brown or blue-brown body and a yellow band across the abdomen and sometimes two yellow spots near the base of the abdomen. Its six legs are mostly yellow, but darker near the bases, and darken with age. The antennae are nearly as long as the body, and have yellow, brown, and purple pigmentation. In contrast, juveniles are almost entirely yellow and can difficult to differentiate from other taxa.

== Distribution ==
Entomobrya bicolor has been collected in Pennsylvania, New Jersey, Virginia, North Carolina, Minnesota, Iowa, Kansas, and Illinois.

== Taxonomy ==
Entomobrya bicolor was formally described in 1903 by Joseph Guthrie in a work describing the springtails of Minnesota. A type specimen was not designated or is not known, though the type locality is Minneapolis.

In his 1958 taxonomic overview of the nearctic species of Entomobrya, Kenneth Christiansen placed E. bicolor, along with E. quadrilineata and E. decemfasciata, in a species complex referred to as the E. bicolor group, possibly corresponding to a previously-recognized genus Callistella described by Schott in 1894. The morphological characters common to members of the E. bicolor group include an elongated body, long appendages, and an abundance of bristles, arranged asymmetrically and with a high level of variability. Color patterns are useful for differentiating the three taxa in the E. bicolor group.
