= Womersleymeria =

Scientific classification
- Kingdom: Animalia
- Phylum: Arthropoda
- Clade: Pancrustacea
- Class: Collembola
- Order: Poduromorpha
- Family: Neanuridae
- Genus: Womersleymeria; Stach, 1949
- Species: W. bicornis

Binomial name
- Womersleymeria bicornis (Womersley, 1940)

Synonyms
- Ceratrimeria bicornis Womersley, 1940

Genus of springtails

Womersleymeria is a monotypic genus of springtails containing only the species Womersleymeria bicornis. It is endemic to south-eastern Australia.

== Taxonomy and history ==
This species was described as Ceratrimeria bicornis in 1940 by Herbert Womersley of the South Australian Museum based on two adult specimens from Ida Bay, Tasmania, one immature specimen from Belgrave, Victoria, and one adult specimen from Olinda, Victoria. In 1949 Jan Stach erected the new genus Womersleymeria for this species, combining it as Womersleymeria bicornis.

== Distribution and habitat ==
Womersleymeria bicornis is known from Victoria and Tasmania, where it can be found in and under rotting logs in forests.
