= E. nivalis =

E. nivalis may refer to:

- Entomobrya nivalis, an arthropod species
- Eucobresia nivalis, a mollusc species
