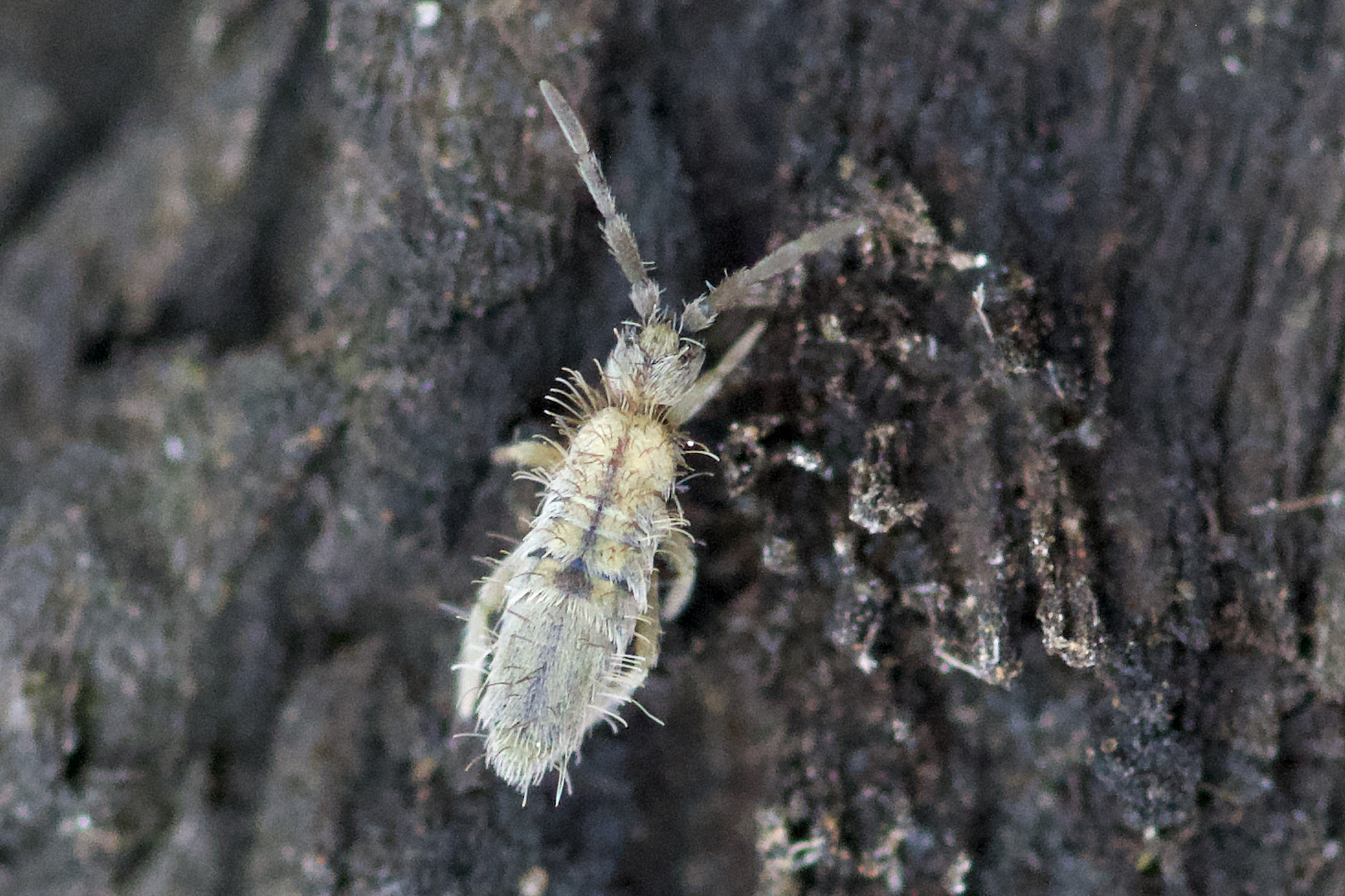
- Entomobrya unostrigata photographed in Toronto, Canada
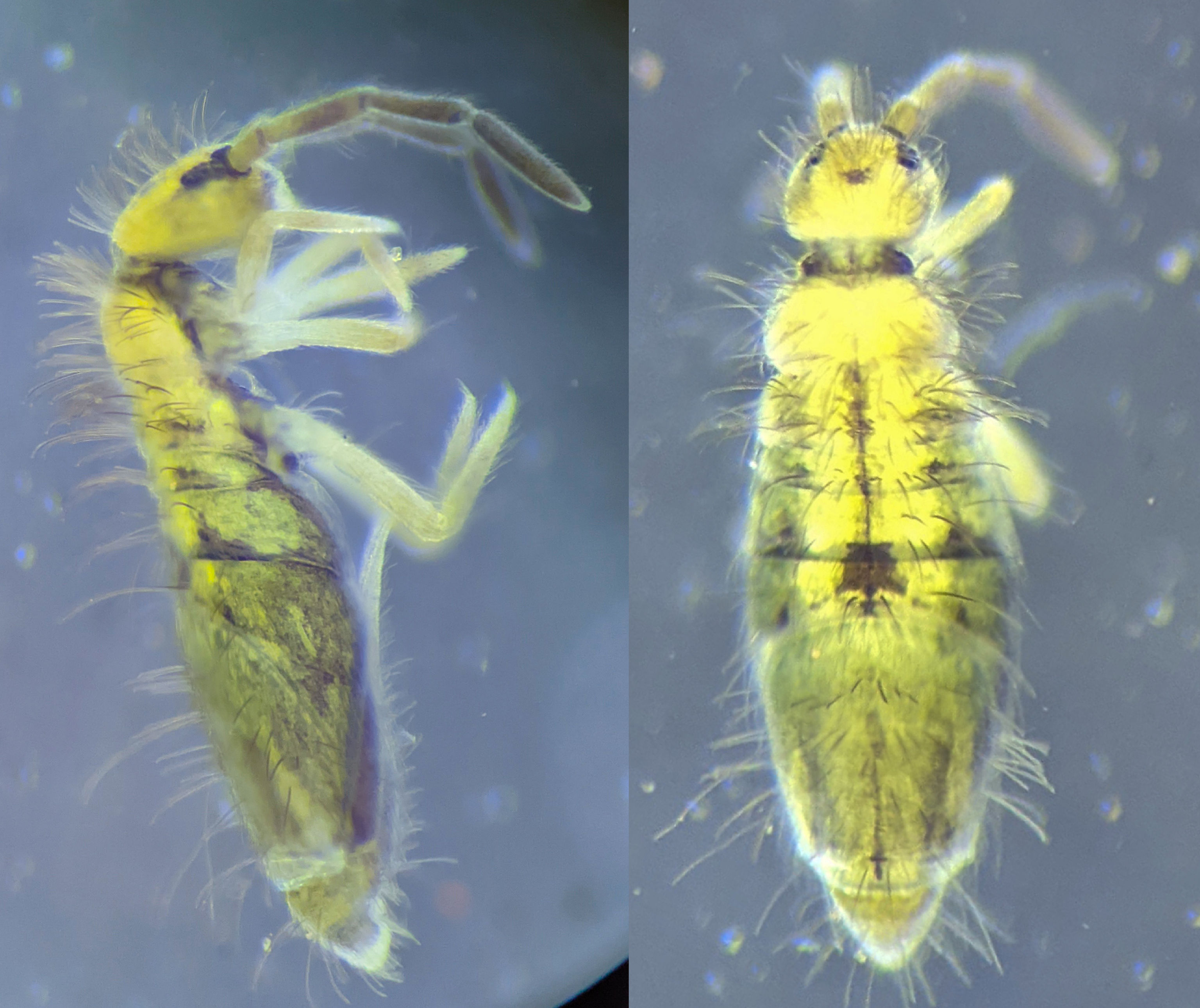
- E. unostrigata specimen viewed through a dissecting microscope

Scientific classification
- Kingdom: Animalia
- Phylum: Arthropoda
- Clade: Pancrustacea
- Class: Collembola
- Order: Entomobryomorpha
- Family: Entomobryidae
- Genus: Entomobrya
- Species: E. unostrigata

Binomial name
- Entomobrya unostrigata Stach, 1930

Synonyms
- Entomobrya kanaba Wray, 1953

= Entomobrya unostrigata =

Species of springtail

Entomobrya unostrigata, the cotton springtail, is a species of slender springtails in the family Entomobryidae.

== Subspecies ==
These two subspecies belong to the species Entomobrya unostrigata:

- Entomobrya unostrigata dorsosignata Stach, 1963^{g}
- Entomobrya unostrigata unostrigata Stach, 1930^{g}

Data sources: i = ITIS, c = Catalogue of Life, g = GBIF, b = Bugguide.net
