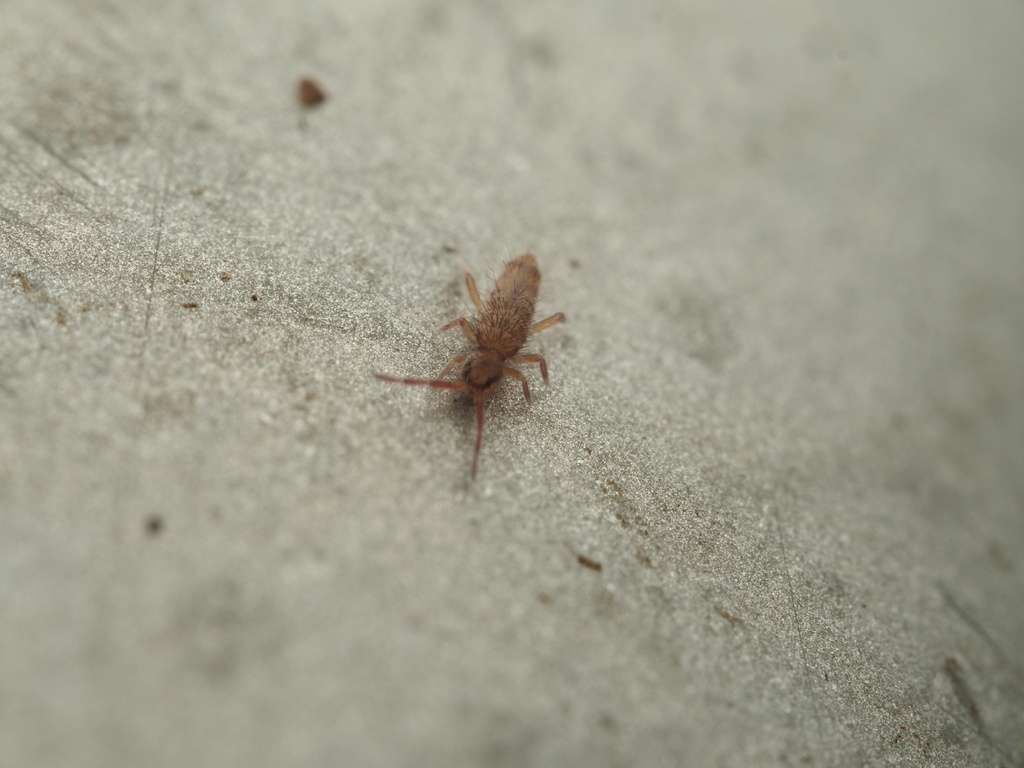

Scientific classification
- Kingdom: Animalia
- Phylum: Arthropoda
- Class: Collembola
- Order: Entomobryomorpha
- Family: Entomobryidae
- Genus: Entomobrya
- Species: E. multifasciata

Binomial name
- Entomobrya multifasciata (Tullberg, 1871)

Synonyms
- Degeeria multifasciata Tullberg, 1871

= Entomobrya multifasciata =

Species of springtail

Entomobrya multifasciata is a species of springtail of cosmopolitan distribution in the family Entomobryidae.

== Appearance ==
This species is characterized by its wavy striped pattern, long body, and lightly hairy top of the abdomen.

== Habitat ==
This species has been spotted feeding off pollen grains, but also can be found resting on leaves or much rarely under wood chips.

This species has a preference for more urban areas, and seems to become a lot less common in more wooded areas.
