= Entomobrya griseoolivata =

Scientific classification
- Domain: Eukaryota
- Kingdom: Animalia
- Phylum: Arthropoda
- Class: Collembola
- Order: Entomobryomorpha
- Family: Entomobryidae
- Genus: Entomobrya
- Species: E. griseoolivata

Binomial name
- Entomobrya griseoolivata (Packard, 1873)

Synonyms
- Degeria griseoolivata Packard, 1873; Isorobryoides ochracius Maynard, 1951

Species of springtail

Entomobrya griseoolivata is a species of slender springtails in the family Entomobryidae.
