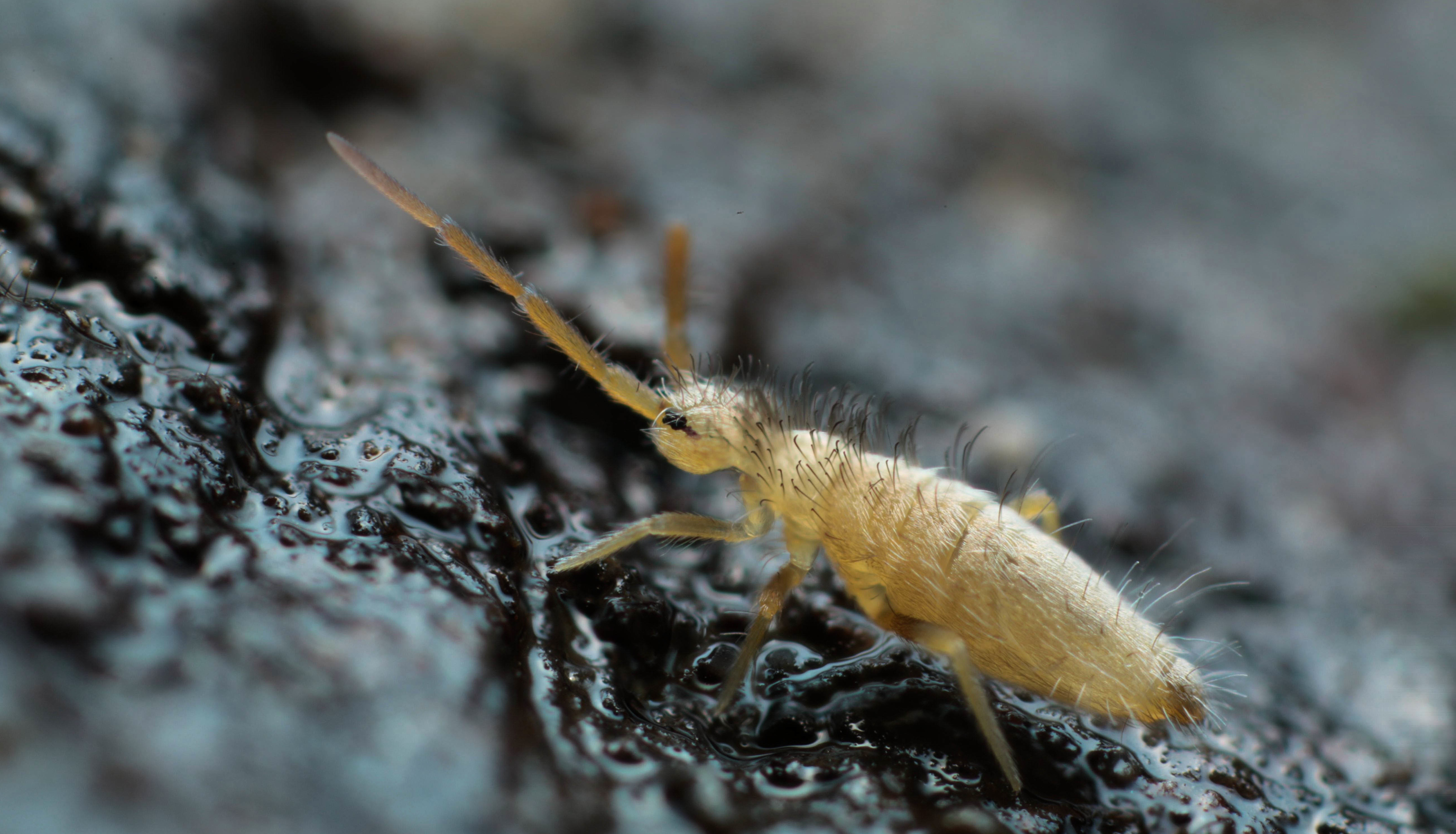

Scientific classification
- Kingdom: Animalia
- Phylum: Arthropoda
- Clade: Pancrustacea
- Class: Collembola
- Order: Entomobryomorpha
- Family: Entomobryidae
- Genus: Entomobrya
- Species: E. lanuginosa

Binomial name
- Entomobrya lanuginosa (Nicolet, 1842)

Synonyms
- Entomobrya maritima (Schött, 1893)

= Entomobrya lanuginosa =

Species of springtail

Entomobrya lanuginosa is a species of springtail in the genus Entomobrya.

== Taxonomy and systematics ==
It was found to be conspecific with Entomobrya maritima, making Entomobrya maritima no longer recognized.

== Description ==
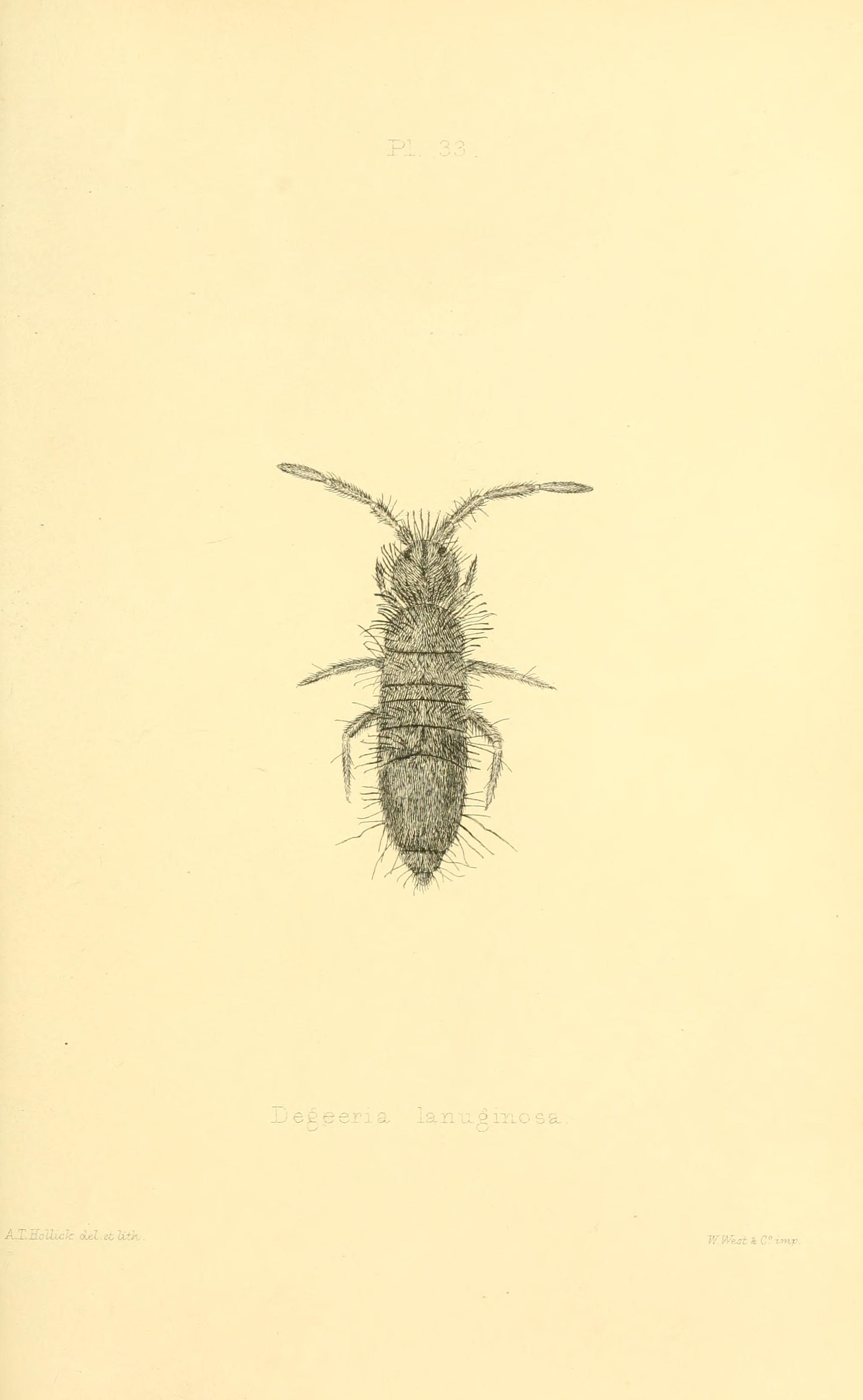
Illustration of E. lanuginosa.

It is a greenish to greyish-blue species that grows up to two millimeters in length. It has smooth labral papillae and a prominent spot of pigment on the head between the bases of the two antennae.

== Distribution ==
It is found in western and central Europe, including Ireland and the UK.

== Ecology ==
It is an herbivore, feeding on live and dead plant tissue, mosses, lichens and algae.
