= Entomobrya comparata =

Scientific classification
- Domain: Eukaryota
- Kingdom: Animalia
- Phylum: Arthropoda
- Class: Collembola
- Order: Entomobryomorpha
- Family: Entomobryidae
- Genus: Entomobrya
- Species: E. comparata

Binomial name
- Entomobrya comparata Folsom, 1919

Synonyms
- Entomobrya folsomi Bonet, 1934; Entomobrya frontalis Mills, 1935; Entomobrya lateropicta Hammer, 1953

Species of springtail

Entomobrya comparata is a species of slender springtails in the family Entomobryidae.
