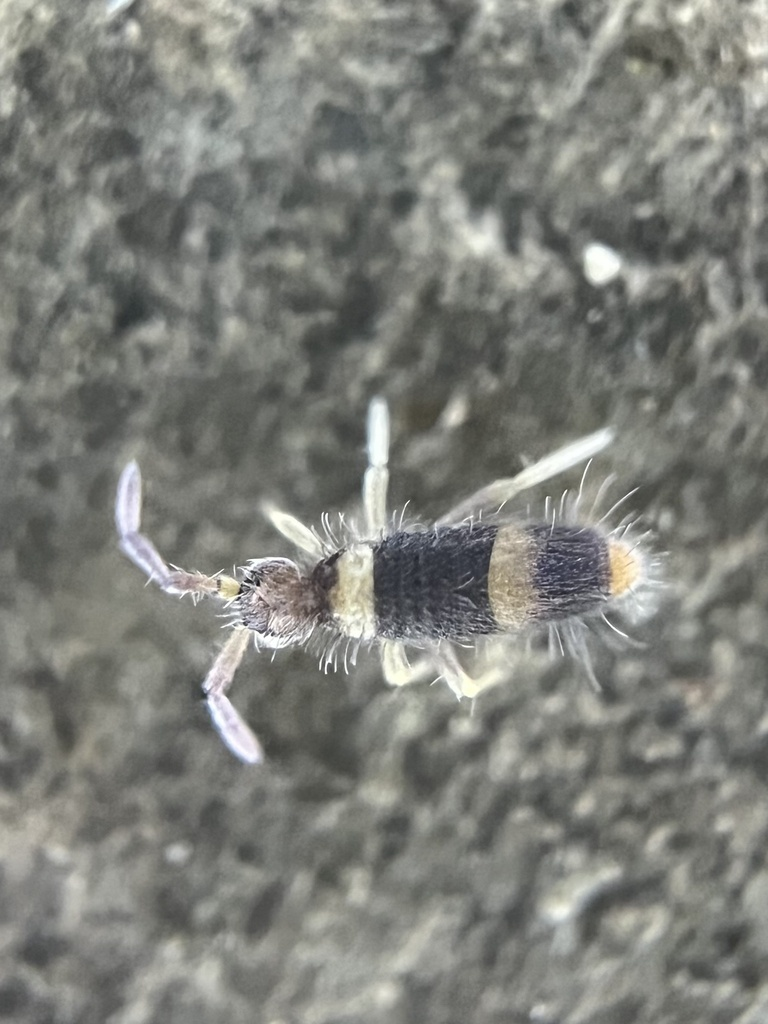
- Entomobrya clitellaria found in Tukwila Park, an urban nature park in Tukwila, WA

Scientific classification
- Kingdom: Animalia
- Phylum: Arthropoda
- Clade: Pancrustacea
- Class: Collembola
- Order: Entomobryomorpha
- Family: Entomobryidae
- Genus: Entomobrya
- Species: E. clitellaria

Binomial name
- Entomobrya clitellaria Guthrie, 1903

Synonyms
- Entomobrya albicolis Franklin, 1905; Entomobrya cyanica Scott, 1952; Entomobrya millsi Bonet, 1942; Entomobrya ontarionensis James, 1933; Entomobrya pseudoperpulchra Mills, 1931

= Entomobrya clitellaria =

Species of springtail

Entomobrya clitellaria is a species of springtail in the genus Entomobrya. It is endemic to North America but has been introduced to Australia.

This species has an overall yellowish body, with black banding. It has black to purple pigmented antenna. It has 4 segments per antenna.

This species is for the most part found in urban habitats across north America, and Australia.
