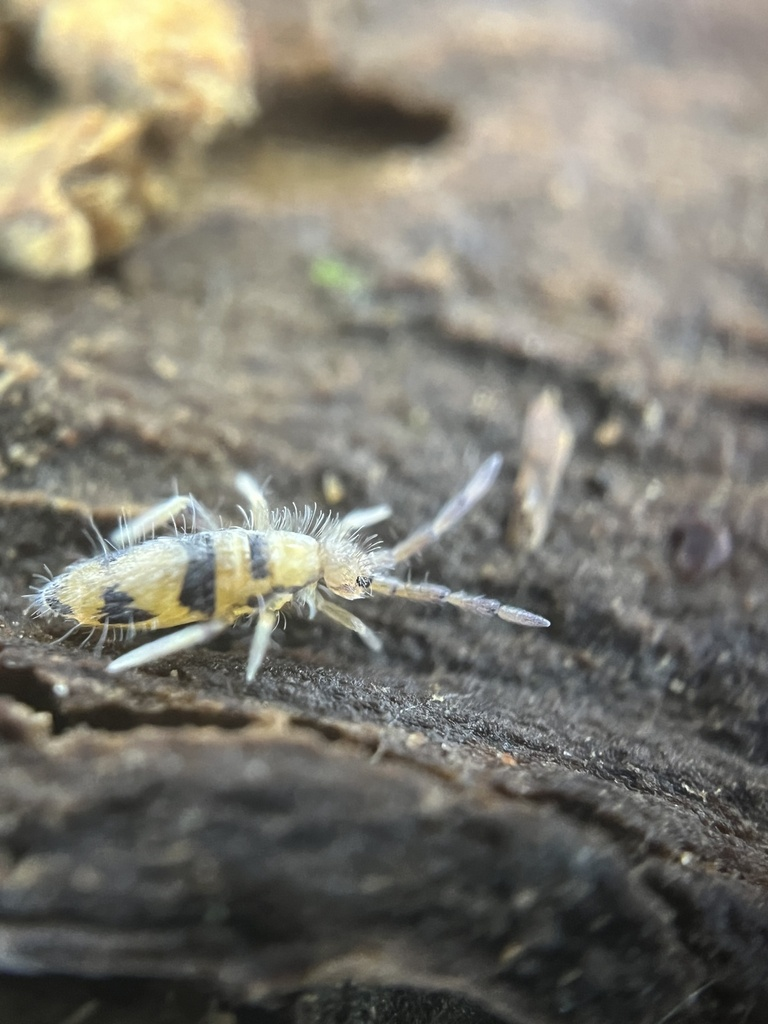

Scientific classification
- Kingdom: Animalia
- Phylum: Arthropoda
- Clade: Pancrustacea
- Class: Collembola
- Order: Entomobryomorpha
- Family: Entomobryidae
- Genus: Entomobrya
- Species: E. triangularis

Binomial name
- Entomobrya triangularis Schott, 1896

Synonyms
- Entomobrya tampicensis Mills, 1935

= Entomobrya triangularis =

Species of springtail

Entomobrya triangularis is a species of slender springtails in the family Entomobryidae found in Western North America and Mexico.

== Appearance ==
This species is characterized by a triangular pattern near the end of the abdomen, a broken basal dorsal band and a complete dorsal band. the body is extremely hairy. This species is shorter than other Entomobrya ssp.

== Habitat ==
This species is found under dead wood or shaken from coniferous trees across Western North America.

== Diet ==
This species eats cedar pollen, dead leaf fragments, and dead wood.
