= Entomobrya washingtonia =

Scientific classification
- Domain: Eukaryota
- Kingdom: Animalia
- Phylum: Arthropoda
- Class: Collembola
- Order: Entomobryomorpha
- Family: Entomobryidae
- Genus: Entomobrya
- Species: E. washingtonia

Binomial name
- Entomobrya washingtonia Mills, 1935

Species of springtail

Entomobrya washingtonia is a species of slender springtails in the family Entomobryidae.
