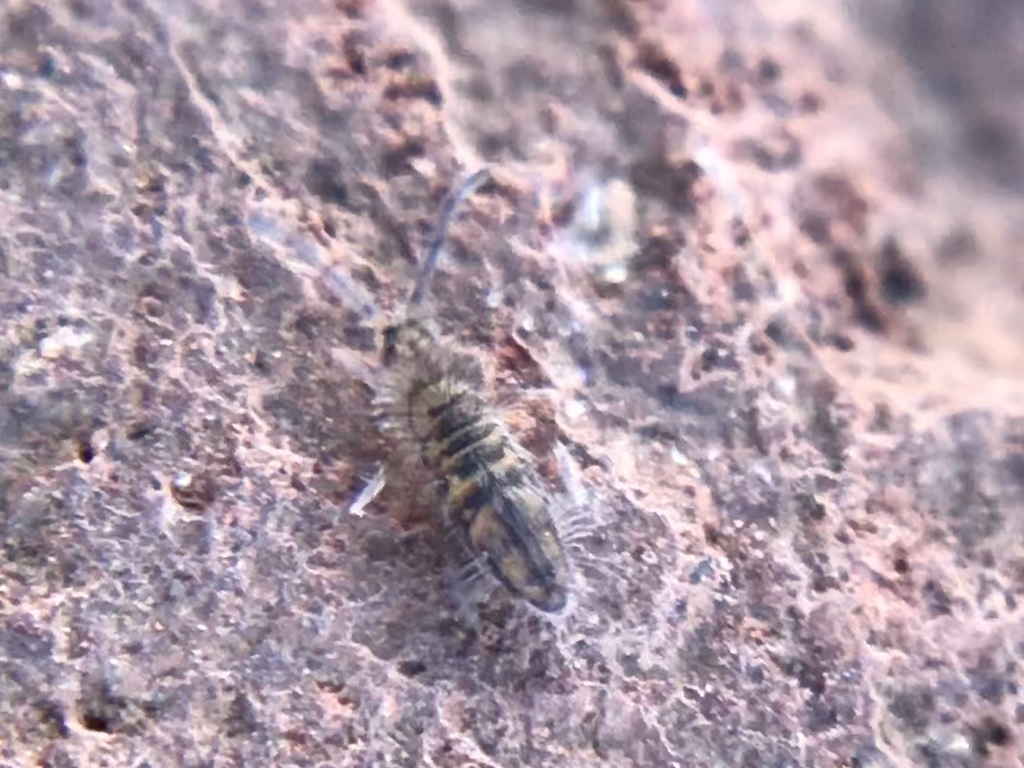
- Entomobrya zona from Colorado

Scientific classification
- Domain: Eukaryota
- Kingdom: Animalia
- Phylum: Arthropoda
- Class: Collembola
- Order: Entomobryomorpha
- Family: Entomobryidae
- Genus: Entomobrya
- Species: E. zona

Binomial name
- Entomobrya zona Christiansen and Bellinger, 1980

= Entomobrya zona =

Species of springtail

Entomobrya zona or the Rocky Mountain springtail is a species of springtail found in the Rocky Mountains, and they are also known from three caves in the Grand Canyon. They are commonly found at high altitudes under rocks, and logs and in the entrance and twilight zones of caves. Little is known about their biology though they are thought to be troglophiles.

== Description ==
Entomobrya zona is tan with black markings and grows to about 2 millimeters long. They often have a wide dark band running down the center of their abdomen which coupled with their distribution can be used to easily identify the species.

== Habitat ==
They are known from elevations of 5,600 feet (1,700 meters) to over 10,000 feet (3,000 meters). These springtails can be found in arid environments and in coniferous forests in the Rockies and westward. They can be often seen in caves, under rocks, wood logs and other debris.

== Distribution ==
Range throughout part of the rocky mountains, under rocks and within caves. They are often found at high elevations throughout their range.
