= Entomobrya assuta =

Scientific classification
- Domain: Eukaryota
- Kingdom: Animalia
- Phylum: Arthropoda
- Class: Collembola
- Order: Entomobryomorpha
- Family: Entomobryidae
- Genus: Entomobrya
- Species: E. assuta

Binomial name
- Entomobrya assuta Folson, 1924

Synonyms
- Entomobrya maizeae Wray, 1948

Species of springtail

Entomobrya assuta is a species of slender springtails in the family Entomobryidae.
