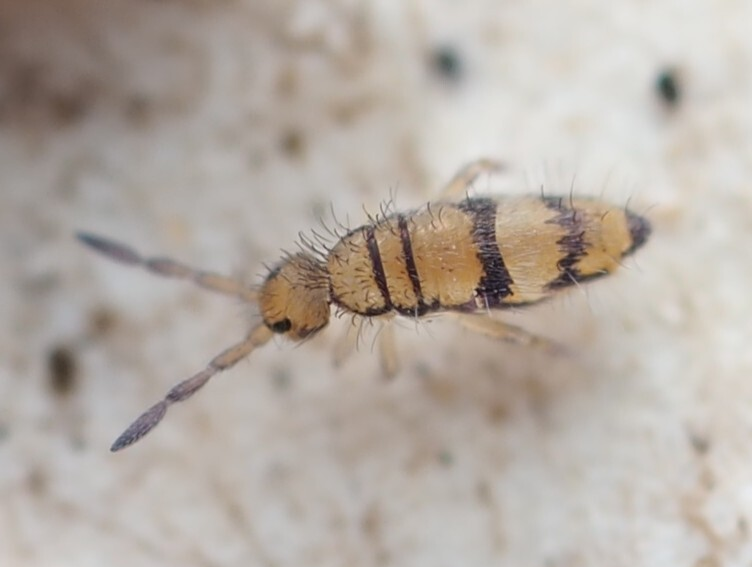

Scientific classification
- Kingdom: Animalia
- Phylum: Arthropoda
- Clade: Pancrustacea
- Class: Collembola
- Order: Entomobryomorpha
- Family: Entomobryidae
- Genus: Entomobrya
- Species: E. ligata

Binomial name
- Entomobrya ligata Folsom, 1924

= Entomobrya ligata =

Species of springtail

Entomobrya ligata is a species of slender springtails in the family Entomobryidae.
