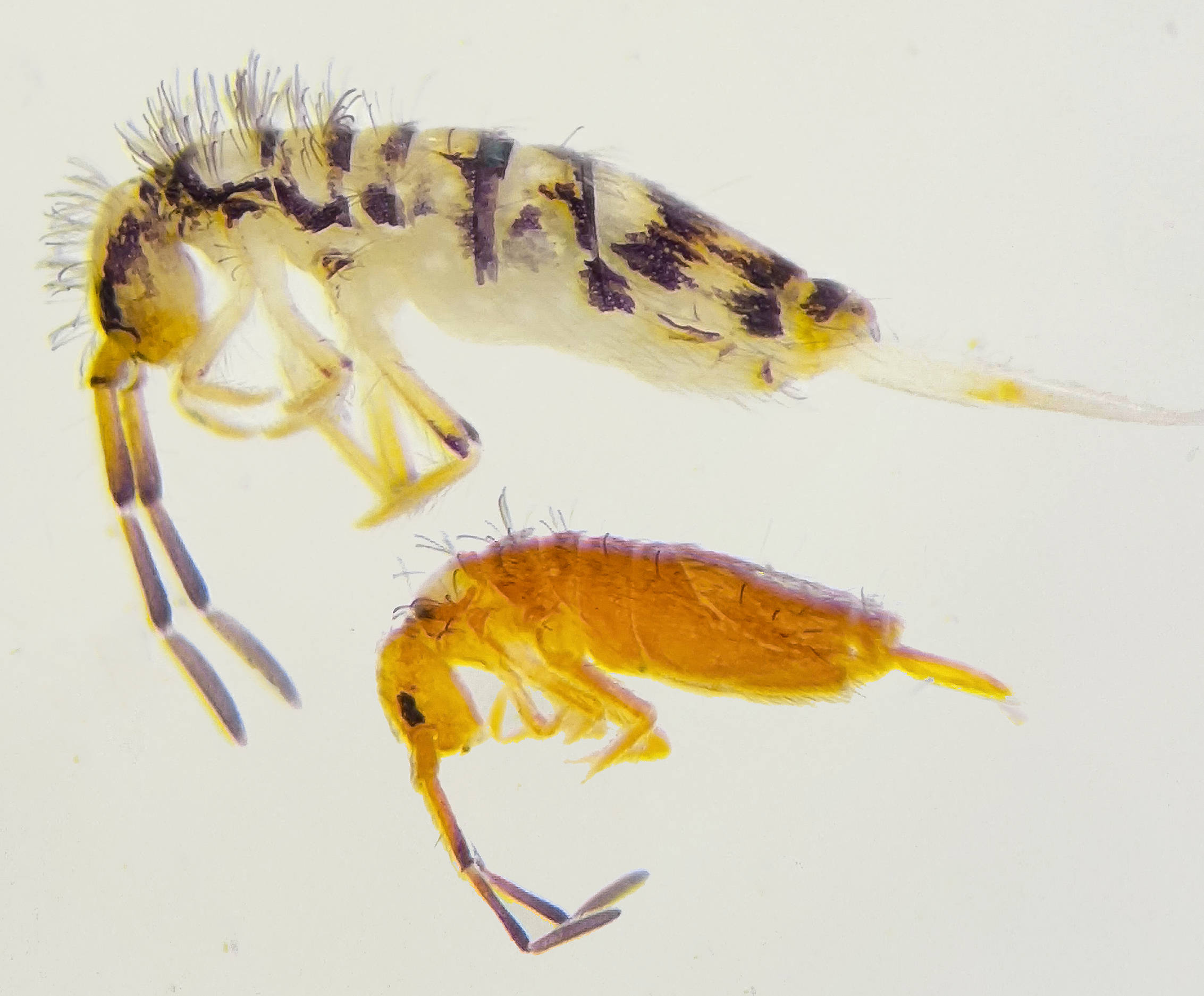
- Female and male E. atrocincta

Scientific classification
- Kingdom: Animalia
- Phylum: Arthropoda
- Clade: Pancrustacea
- Class: Collembola
- Order: Entomobryomorpha
- Family: Entomobryidae
- Genus: Entomobrya
- Species: E. atrocincta

Binomial name
- Entomobrya atrocincta Schott, 1896

Synonyms
- Entomobrya citrina Schott, 1896; Entomobrya nigrocincta Denis, 1924

= Entomobrya atrocincta =

Species of springtail

Entomobrya atrocincta is a species of slender springtails in the family Entomobryidae. They display notable sexual dimorphism, rare in springtails, with the males being a vivid orange (occasionally with white or black bands), and the females being a duller tan.
