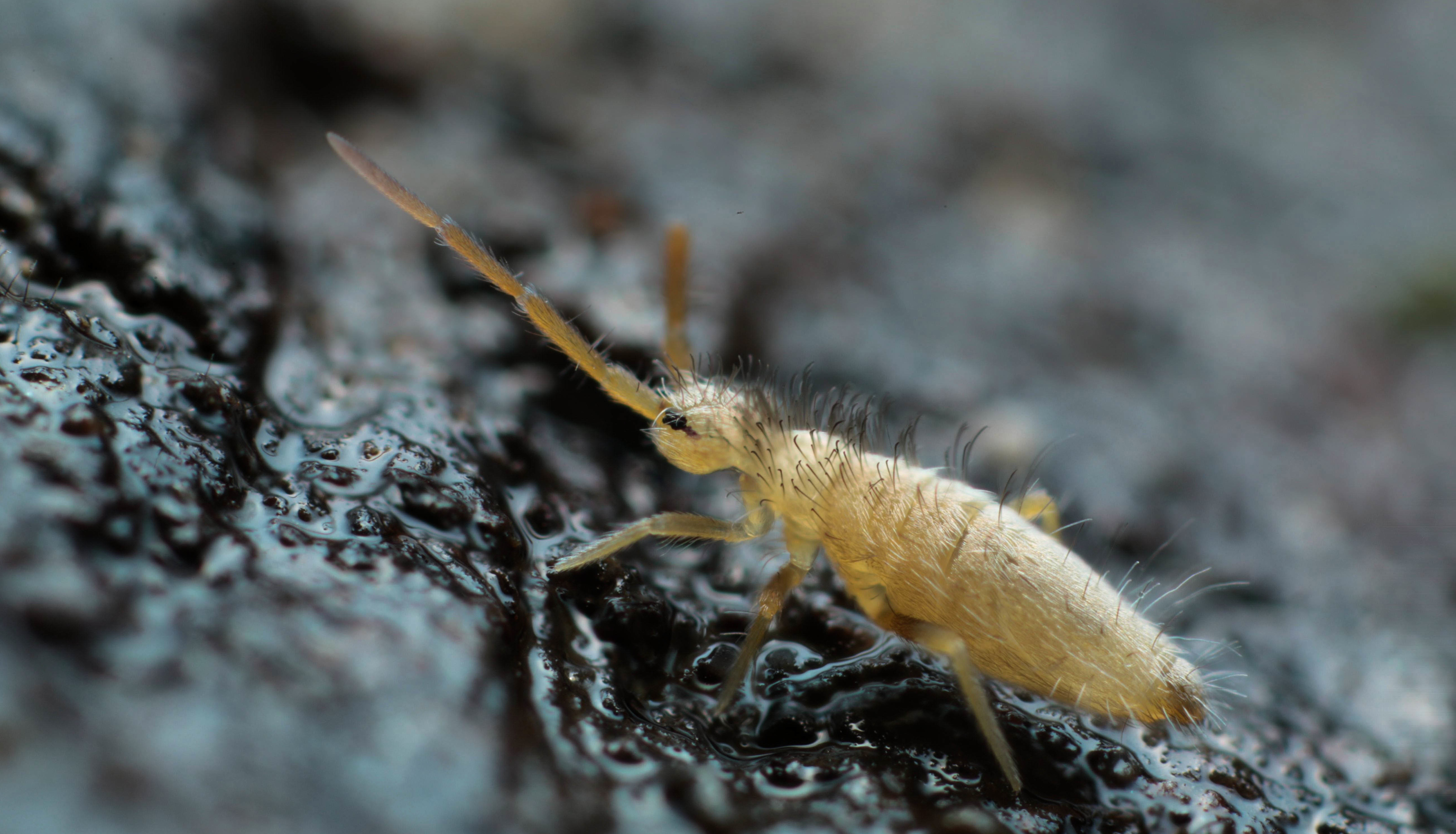
- Entomobrya lanuginosa

Scientific classification
- Kingdom: Animalia
- Phylum: Arthropoda
- Class: Collembola
- Order: Entomobryomorpha
- Family: Entomobryidae
- Subfamily: Entomobryinae
- Genus: Entomobrya; Rondani, 1861

Synonyms
- Isotobryoides Maynard, 1951

= Entomobrya =

Genus of springtails

Entomobrya is a genus of slender springtails in the family Entomobryidae. There are at least 270 described species in Entomobrya.

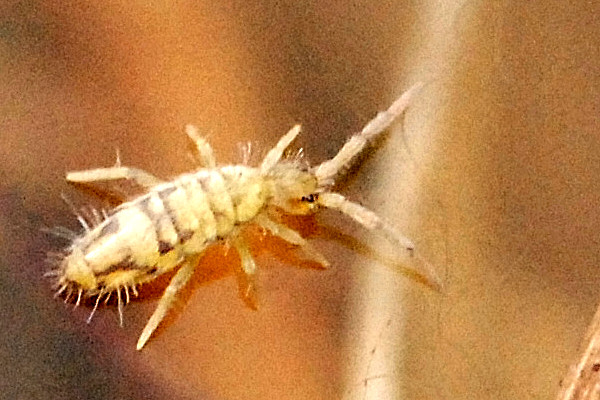
Entomobrya nivalis

== Selected species ==
- Entomobrya albocincta (Templeton, 1835)
- Entomobrya aniwaniwaensis Salmon, 1941
- Entomobrya anthema Wray, 1962
- Entomobrya arnaudi Wray, 1953
- Entomobrya arula Christiansen and Bellinger, 1980
- Entomobrya assuta Folson, 1924
- Entomobrya atrocincta Schott, 1896
- Entomobrya bicolor Guthrie, 1903
- Entomobrya californica (Schott, 1891)
- Entomobrya cingula Boener, 1906
- Entomobrya clitellaria Guthrie, 1903
- Entomobrya comparata Folsom, 1919
- Entomobrya confusa Christiansen, 1958
- Entomobrya decemfasciata (Packard, 1873)
- Entomobrya dissimilis Noniez, 1894
- Entomobrya duolineata Bueker, 1939
- Entomobrya erratica Brown, 1932
- Entomobrya exalga (Salmon, 1942)
- Entomobrya gisini Christiansen, 1958
- Entomobrya griseoolivata (Packard, 1873)
- Entomobrya guthriei Mills, 1931
- Entomobrya haikea Christiansen and Bellinger, 1992
- Entomobrya hihiu Christiansen and Bellinger, 1992
- Entomobrya insularis Carpenter, 1904
- Entomobrya intermedia Brooks, 1993
- Entomobrya kalakaua Carpenter, 1904
- Entomobrya kea Christiansen and Bellinger, 1992
- Entomobrya kincaidi Folsom, 1902
- Entomobrya laguna Bacon, 1913
- Entomobrya laha Christiansen and Bellinger, 1992
- Entomobrya lanuginosa Nicolet, 1842
- Entomobrya ligata Folsom, 1924
- Entomobrya malena Christiansen and Bellinger, 1992
- Entomobrya marginata Tullberg, 1981
- Entomobrya mauka Christiansen and Bellinger, 1992
- Entomobrya mauna Christiansen and Bellinger, 1992
- Entomobrya mineola Folsom, 1924
- Entomobrya multifasciata
- Entomobrya multifasciatus (Tullberg, 1871)
- Entomobrya muscorum (Nicolet, 1842)
- Entomobrya nani Christiansen and Bellinger, 1992
- Entomobrya nicoleti (Lubbock, 1868) Brook, 1884
- Entomobrya nigriceps Mills, 1932
- Entomobrya nivalis (Linnaeus, 1758) (cosmopolitan springtail)
- Entomobrya nyhusae Christiansen and Bellinger, 1992
- Entomobrya panoanoa Christiansen and Bellinger, 1992
- Entomobrya perpulchra (Packard, 1873)
- Entomobrya petri McCulloch, 2025
- Entomobrya powehi Christiansen and Bellinger, 1992
- Entomobrya puakea Christiansen and Bellinger, 1992
- Entomobrya purpurascens Packard, 1873
- Entomobrya quadrilineata Bueker, 1939
- Entomobrya sabulicola Mills, 1931
- Entomobrya sauteri Boener, 1909
- Entomobrya sinelloides Christiansen, 1958
- Entomobrya socia Denis, 1939
- Entomobrya spectabilis Reuter, 1892
- Entomobrya suzannae Scott, 1942
- Entomobrya triangularis Schott, 1896
- Entomobrya troglodytes Christiansen, 1958
- Entomobrya unostrigata Stach, 1930 (cotton springtail)
- Entomobrya washingtonia Mills, 1935
- Entomobrya zona Christiansen and Bellinger, 1980
