= Entomobrya decemfasciata =

Scientific classification
- Domain: Eukaryota
- Kingdom: Animalia
- Phylum: Arthropoda
- Class: Collembola
- Order: Entomobryomorpha
- Family: Entomobryidae
- Genus: Entomobrya
- Species: E. decemfasciata

Binomial name
- Entomobrya decemfasciata (Packard, 1873)

Synonyms
- Degeeria decemfasciata Packard, 1873; Entomobrya intonsa Mills, 1932; Entomobrya stachi Wray, 1957

Species of springtail

Entomobrya decemfasciata is a species of slender springtails in the family Entomobryidae.
