= Herbert Womersley =

British-born Australian entomologist (1889–1962)

- Born: 10 April 1889; Warrington, Lancashire, England
- Died: 14 October 1962 (aged 73); Adelaide, South Australia, Australia
- Occupation: Entomologist
- Employer(s): HM Factory, Gretna, Royal Entomological Society, Linnean Society of London, Commonwealth Scientific and Industrial Research Organisation, South Australian Museum
- Children: 2; Hugh Bryan Spencer Womersley

Herbert Womersley (1889–1962) was an English entomologist whose works were especially concerned with mites and ticks, silverfish and flies. His research into the diversity of Australian resulted in descriptions of new insect taxa.

== Biography ==
Womersley was enlisted for wartime service in two English military sections, during 1915 to 1917 in the Royal Army Medical Corps and the Chemical Corps, Royal Engineers.

After volunteering to join the chemical engineers, Womersley was engaged to transport tanks of poisons toward the frontlines of battle and release phosgene, chlorine and other weaponised gases when the prevailing wind became unfavourable to the enemy. Womersley was involved in the earliest chemical weapon attacks on German troops during the European conflict, including the first British use at the Battle of Loos.

He served next at the munitions factory, H.M. Factory Gretna as a chemist until the end of the war. His later employment in Britain included a soap manufacturer and positions at the Entomological and Linnean Society of London. He left England for Australia in 1930 and began his life's work on insects of the Australasian region. The first position he held was for a division of the CSIRO in Western Australia. His career included the role as resident entomologist and later honorary, and retroactively, Acarologist at the South Australian Museum and honorary positions and president of the Royal Society of South Australia.

== Works ==
Around 200 publications by Womersley gave the results of his work on the taxonomy of several orders of insects, the Acarina (mites and ticks), Apterygota (silverfish) and Diptera (flies), around three quarters of which concerned his eventual speciality, the Acarina.

Herbert Womersley was commemorated in the names of genera and species. The seven genera are Womersia, Womersleyessia, Womersleyia and Womersleyna of Acarina and Womersleya, Womersleyella and Womersleymeria of the Collembola.
