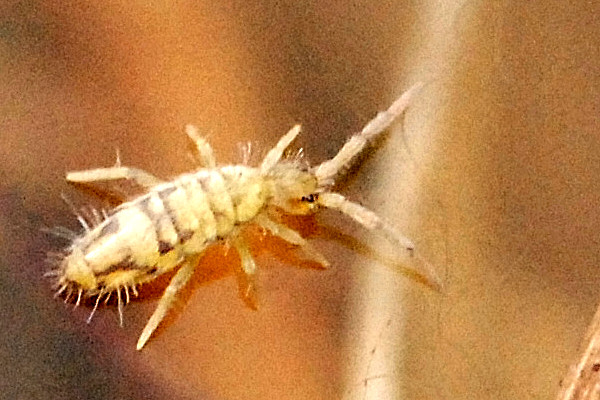

Scientific classification
- Kingdom: Animalia
- Phylum: Arthropoda
- Class: Collembola
- Order: Entomobryomorpha
- Family: Entomobryidae
- Genus: Entomobrya
- Species: E. nivalis

Binomial name
- Entomobrya nivalis (Linnaeus, 1758)

= Entomobrya nivalis =

Species of springtail

Entomobrya nivalis, the cosmopolitan springtail, is a species of slender springtails in the family Entomobryidae.

== Description ==
The cosmopolitan springtail measures about 2 mm in length. Its color consists of a yellow or white background with dark pigment forming transversal bands along the third segment of the thorax and the segments 2 to 6 of the abdomen. The fourth segment of the abdomen has a U- or 11-shaped pattern that easily distinguishes this species from others in the genus Entomobrya.

== Ecology ==
The cosmopolitan springtail is found in temperate and polar regions of North America and Europe. Juveniles usually live in the leaf litter of forests and migrate upward after becoming adults, living among lichens growing on trees. During winter, they shelter under loose portions of bark.

The hemolymph of the cosmopolitan springtail is rich in antifreeze compounds, allowing it to withstand the very low temperatures of winter.
