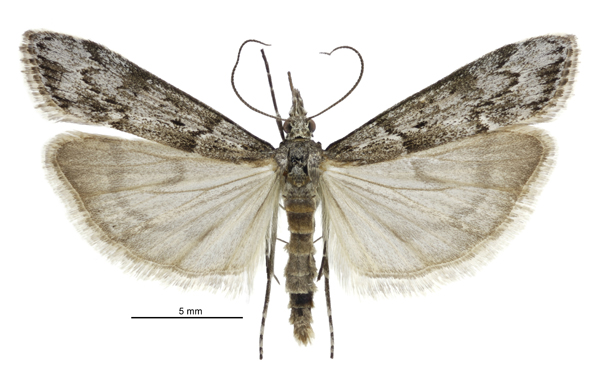
- Male

Scientific classification
- Kingdom: Animalia
- Phylum: Arthropoda
- Clade: Pancrustacea
- Class: Insecta
- Order: Lepidoptera
- Family: Crambidae
- Genus: Eudonia
- Species: E. psammitis

Binomial name
- Eudonia psammitis (Meyrick, 1884)

Synonyms
- Scoparia psammitis Meyrick, 1884; Witlesia psammitis campbellensis Munroe, 1964

= Eudonia psammitis =

Species of moth

Eudonia psammitis is a moth in the family Crambidae. It was named by Edward Meyrick in 1884. Meyrick gives a description of the species in 1885. It is endemic to New Zealand, including the Campbell Islands.

The wingspan is 21–27 mm. The forewings are whitish-ochreous or ochreous-grey, irrorated with dark fuscous or black, and densely irrorated with whitish. The markings are variable in distinctness and may sometimes be almost obsolete. The first line is white, margined by dark posteriorly. The second line is white and margined by dark. The hindwings are whitish-grey. The postmedian line is darker and the hindmargin is suffused with darker grey. Adults have been recorded on wing in January.

== Subspecies ==
This species has two subspecies:

- Eudonia psammitis psammitis Meyrick, 1884
- Eudonia psammitis campbellensis Munroe, 1964

== Behaviour ==
Adults are attracted to light and have been collected via a mercury vapour light trap.
