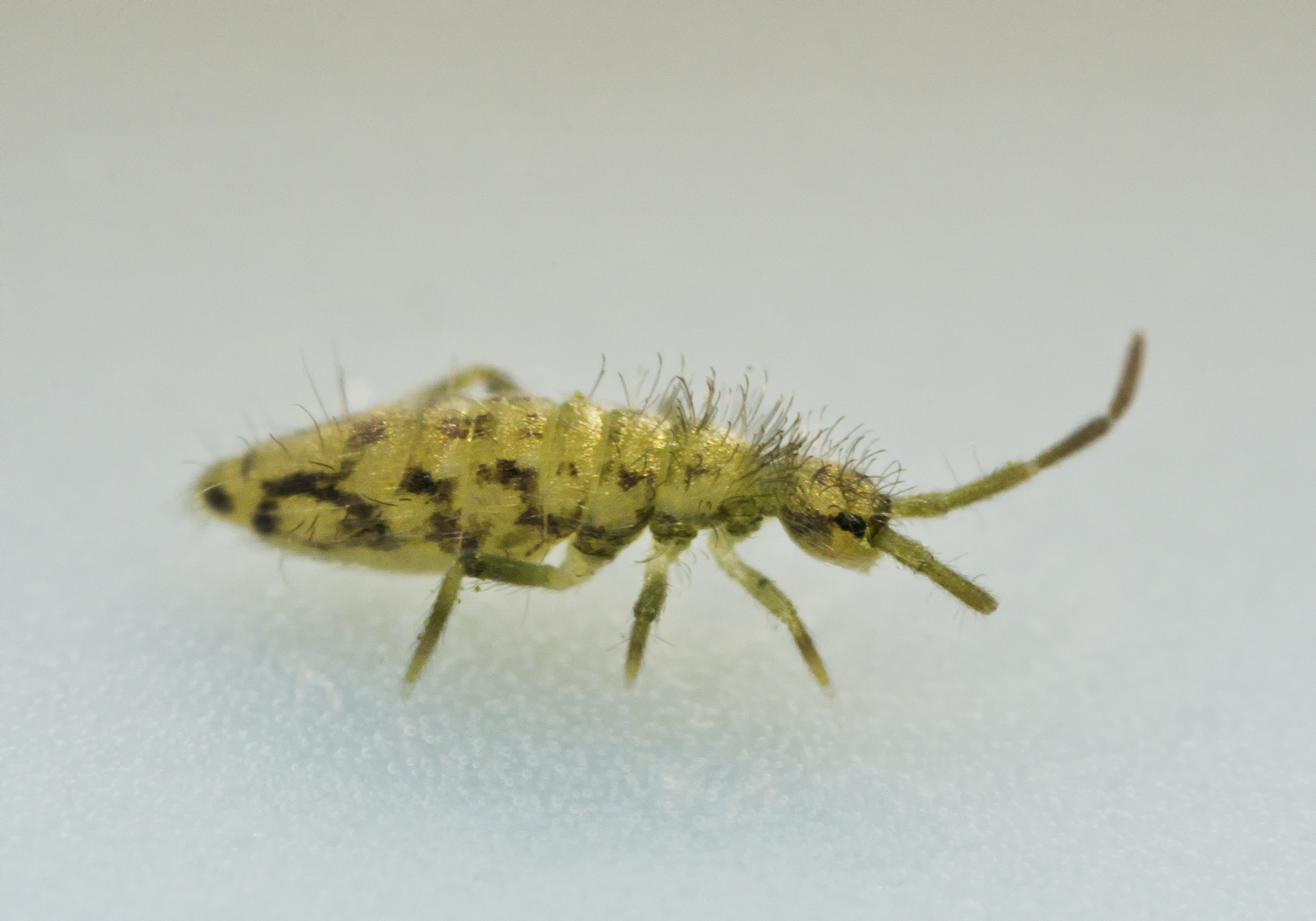
- Entomobrya intermedia

Scientific classification
- Domain: Eukaryota
- Kingdom: Animalia
- Phylum: Arthropoda
- Class: Collembola
- Order: Entomobryomorpha
- Family: Entomobryidae
- Genus: Entomobrya
- Species: E. intermedia

Binomial name
- Entomobrya intermedia Brooks, 1993

= Entomobrya intermedia =

Species of springtail

Entomobrya intermedia is a species of slender springtails in the family Entomobryidae.
