= Jan Stach =

Polish entomologist (1877–1975)

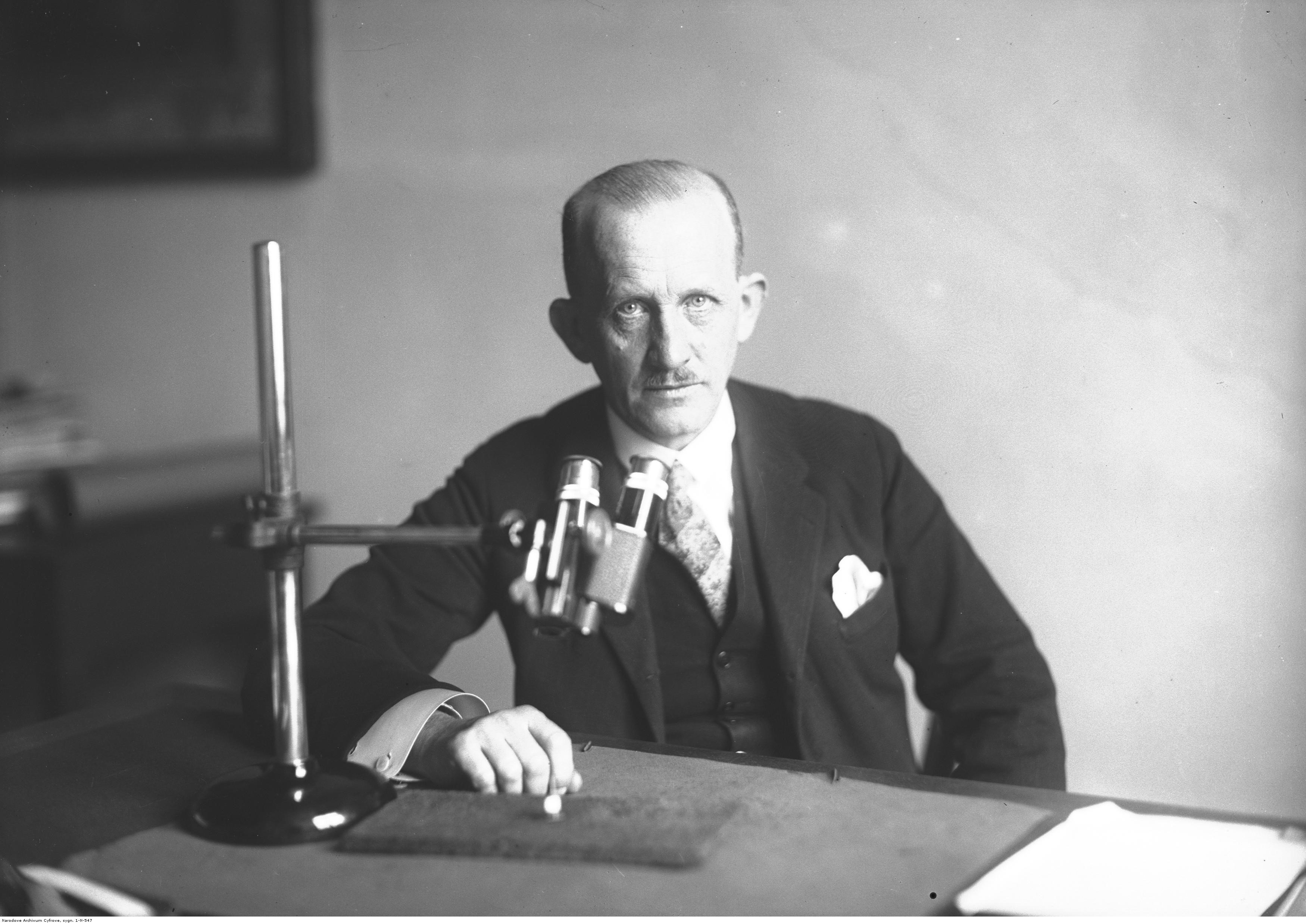

Jan Wacław Stach (8 March 1877 – 28 July 1975) was a Polish zoologist who studied the collembola as well as studied Pliocene mammal fossils. He was a professor at the Jagiellonian University.

== Life and work ==
Stach was born in Rzeszów and studied zoology at the Jagiellonian University, receiving a master's degree in 1900 under Henryk Hoyer. He taught at a school briefly and in 1919 he headed the physiographic museum in Krakow. During military service under the Austro-Hungarian region he collected extensively from the Tatra Mountain region. In 1951 he became a professor and in 1953 he was made director of the institution which later became the institute of zoology under the Polish Academy of Sciences. In 1929 he was involved in excavations in Starunia where a sub-fossil woolly rhinoceros (Coelodonta antiquitatis) was obtained complete with soft parts preserved. Stach oversaw the preservation of this specimen which is now in the Museum of Natural History. After World War II he worked on monographs on the non-insect hexapods, particularly the Collembola which he covered in nine volumes. He described the remains of Ursus wenzensis and other mammals found in Węże reserve in 1959. He collected nearly 65000 specimens of insects based on which many new taxa were described. The louse Stachiella Kéler, 1938; the sprintail Ianstachia Bagnal, 1949; the moth Antispila stachjanella Dziurzynski, 1948; and the fossil rodent Stachomys Kowalski, 1960 are named in his honour.
