= Shelton =

Shelton may refer to:

== Places ==
=== United Kingdom ===
- Shelton, North Bedfordshire, in the parish of Dean and Shelton, Bedfordshire
- Lower Shelton, in the parish of Marston Moretaine, Bedfordshire
- Upper Shelton, in the parish of Marston Moretaine, Bedfordshire
- Shelton, Norfolk
- Shelton, Nottinghamshire
- Shelton, Shropshire
- Shelton, Stoke-on-Trent, Staffordshire

=== United States ===
- Shelton, Connecticut
- Shelton, Nebraska
- Shelton, Washington

== People ==
=== Surname ===
==== General ====
- Alfred Shelton (1865–1923), English international footballer
- Amy Shelton, U.S. cognitive psychology professor
- Anne Shelton (1475–1555), aunt of Anne Boleyn and mother of Henry VIII's mistress, Mary Shelton; wife of Sir John Shelton
- E. Dolby Shelton (1856–1944), English printer, publisher, and activist
- George M. Shelton (1877–1949), Philippine–American War Medal of Honor recipient
- Herbert M. Shelton (1895–1985), Prominent American health educator, pacifist, vegetarian, and advocate of raw foodism and fasting cures
- Hugh Shelton (born 1942), retired US Army four-star general and former chairman of the Joint Chiefs of Staff
- Ian Shelton (born 1957), Canadian astronomer
- Sir John Shelton (1476/7–1539), head of the household of the future Queen Elizabeth I of England
- John Shelton (c.1503–1558), controller and governor to the royal children of Henry VIII's court
- John M. Shelton (1853–1923), American rancher and banker
- Judy Shelton
- Lee Shelton (1865–1912), convicted murderer mentioned in song as "Stagger Lee"
- Nicole Shelton, American academic
- Ronnie Shelton (1961–2018), the "West Side Rapist", American serial rapist
- Ruth Gaines-Shelton (1872-1934), American educator and writer
- Sandra Shelton, American economist
- Thomas Shelton (1600/01–1650(?))
- Thomas Shelton (fl. 1612–1620), British translator of Cervantes
- William L. Shelton (born 1954), US Air Force lieutenant general
- Winston L. Shelton (1922–2019), American businessman and inventor

==== Arts ====
- Ann Shelton (born 1967), New Zealand photographer
- Anne Shelton (1923–1994), British singer
- Blake Shelton (born 1976), American country singer
- Deborah Shelton (born 1948), US-American actress and star of US soap Dallas
- Gilbert Shelton (born 1940), US-American comic artist
- Marley Shelton (born 1974), American actress, sibling of Samantha
- Mary Shelton (1510/15–1570/71), lady-in-waiting, poet and mistress of Henry VIII of England
- Peter L. Shelton (1945–2012), architect and interior designer
- Richard Shelton (1933–2022), US-American poet and author
- Ron Shelton (born 1945), US-American film director
- Roscoe Shelton (1931–2002), American electric blues and R&B singer
- Samantha Shelton (born 1978), American actress, sibling of Marley
- Simon Shelton (1966–2018), English actor
- Tracey Shelton, Australian photojournalist
- Ricky Van Shelton (born 1952), US-American country music singer

==== Politicians ====
- Amanda Shelton (born 1990), Guamanian politician
- Mark M. Shelton (born 1956), American pediatrician and politician
- Norman Shelton (1905–1980), New Zealand politician
- Shelly M. Shelton, Republican member of the Nevada Assembly

==== Sports ====
- Anthony Shelton (born 1967), American football player
- Ben Shelton (born 2002), American tennis player
- Bryan Shelton (born 1965), American tennis player and coach
- Chris Shelton (born 1980), American baseball player for the Texas Rangers
- Coleman Shelton (born 1995), American football player
- Derek Shelton (born 1970), American baseball coach
- Drew Shelton (born 2003), American football player
- Ella Shelton (born 1998), Canadian ice hockey player
- Ernie Shelton (born 1932), American high jumper
- Ian Shelton (1940–2021), Australian rules footballer with Essendon Football Club
- Lonnie Shelton (1955–2018), American basketball player
- Luton Shelton (1985-2021), Jamaican footballer
- Nehemiah Shelton (born 1999), American football player
- Skeeter Shelton (1888–1954), American baseball player and coach

==== Fictional characters ====
- Sgt. Brett C. Shelton, the bullying Sgt. in Child's Play 3, played by Travis Fine
- Harriet Shelton in the British soap opera Doctors, played by Carley Stenson

=== Given name ===
- Shelton Benjamin (born 1975), American wrestler
- Shelton Eppler (born c. 1998), American football player
- Gamini Fonseka (Sembuge Gamini Shelton Fonseka) (1936-2004), Sri Lankan actor, director, and politician
- Shelton Gibson (born 1994), American football player
- D. Shelton A. Gunaratne (1940-2019), American academic
- Shelton Jayasinghe (1922-1978), Sri Lankan Sinhala Cabinet Minister
- Shelton Payagala (1944-2009), Sri Lankan film director and writer
- Shelton Perera (1939-1986), Sri Lankan tabla player, vocalist, and composer
- Shelton Ranaraja (1926-2011), Sri Lankan Sinhala lawyer and deputy minister
- Dudley Shelton Senanayaka (1911-1973), Sri Lankan politician who served as prime minister in three instances
- Shelton Hank Williams (born 1972), American musician
- Spike Lee (born 1957 as Shelton Jackson Lee), American filmmaker

== Other uses ==
- Shelton High School (disambiguation)
- 5953 Shelton, an asteroid
- Shelton Abbey Prison, near Arklow, County Wicklow, Ireland
- Shelton Hospital, former county asylum in Shelton, Shropshire, England
- Shelton Oak, a tree near Shrewsbury, England
- USS Shelton, any of two United States Navy ships
- The Shelton, a historic apartment building in Indianapolis, Indiana, US
- Shelton, a code name during development for a variant of the Pentium M without any level 2 cache, in the Celeron brand

== See also ==
- Sheldon (disambiguation)
- Shilton (disambiguation)
- Skelton (disambiguation)
