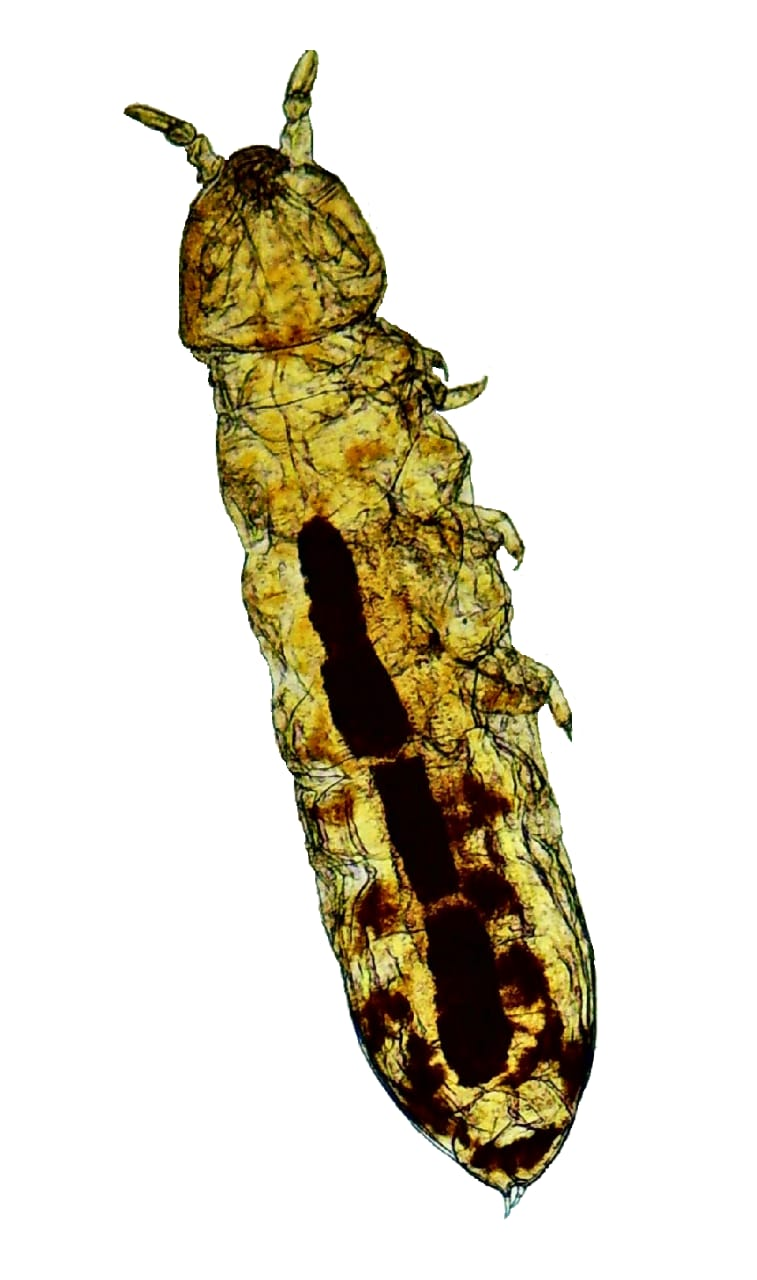
- Bionychiurus tamilensis

Scientific classification
- Domain: Eukaryota
- Kingdom: Animalia
- Phylum: Arthropoda
- Class: Collembola
- Order: Poduromorpha
- Family: Onychiuridae
- Subfamily: Onychiurinae
- Tribe: Onychiurini; Börner, 1906

Genera
- See text

= Onychiurini =

Tribe of the family Onychiuridae

Onychiurini is a tribe within the family Onychiuridae, a group of springtails.

== Species ==
The following genera are accepted within Bionychiurus:

- Absolonia Börner, 1901
- Argonychiurus Bagnall, 1949
- Bionychiurus Pomorski, RJ, 1996
- Deharvengiurus Weiner, WM, 1996
- Deuteraphorura Absolon, K, 1901
- Formosanonychiurus Weiner, 1986
- Leeonychiurus Sun, X & Arbea, J, 2014
- Ongulonychiurus Thibaud, J-M & Massoud, Z, 1986
- Onychiuroides Bagnall, 1948
- Onychiurus Gervais, 1841
- Orthonychiurus Stach, J, 1954
- Pilonychiurus Pomorski, RJ, 2007
- Similonychiurus Pomorski, RJ, 2007
- Uralaphorura Martynova, EF, 1978
- Vibronychiurus Pomorski, 1998
