= Nina Mikhailovna Chernovna =

Russian scientist, soil zoologist, ecologist (1935–2010)

Nina Chernova
- Нина Чернова
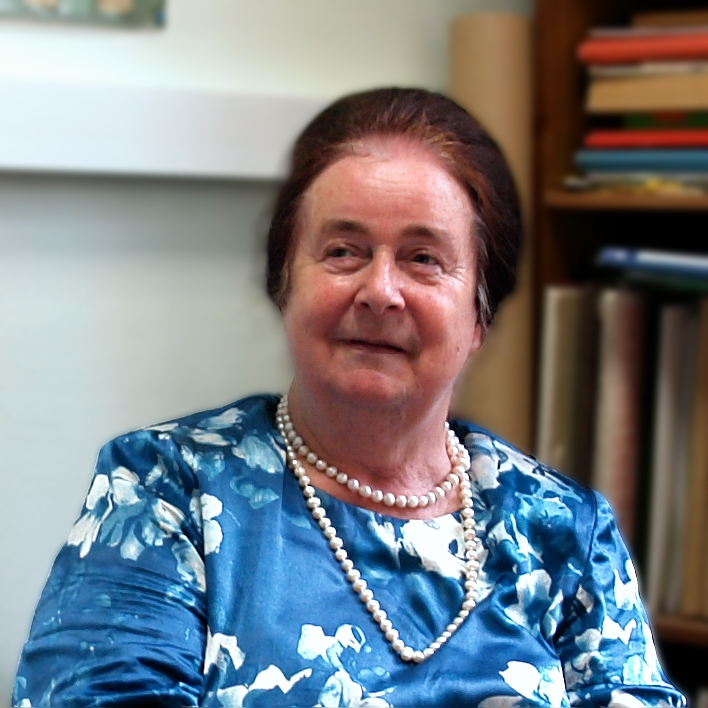
- Chernova in 2010
- Born: 16 May 1935; Volokolamsk, Moscow Oblast, Russian SFSR, Soviet Union
- Died: 9 August 2010 (aged 75); Moscow, Russia
- Known for: Research on Collembola, soil invertebrates, and ecological education
- Scientific career
- Fields: Soil zoology; ecology; entomology
- Institutions: Moscow State Pedagogical University
- Doctoral advisor: Mercury Ghilarov

Nina Mikhailovna Chernova (Russian: Нина Михайловна Чернова; 16 May 1935 – 9 August 2010) was a Soviet and Russian scientist, professor, soil zoologist, ecologist and entomologist. She made significant contributions to the study of soil invertebrates, particularly Collembola (springtails), and played a key role in advancing ecological education in Russia.

== Biography ==
She was born on 16 May 1935 in the city of Volokolamsk, Moscow Oblast, into a teacher's family.

She graduated from high school in the city of Korolyov (city) with a silver medal.

In 1955, she graduated with honors from the Faculty of Natural Sciences at the Moscow State Pedagogical Institute named after V. I. Lenin (MSPI).

Her first scientific research was her diploma thesis on the morphology and ecology of wireworm (Click beetle). Her scientific advisors were Mercury Ghilarov and Maria Glazovskaya. Her scientific priorities included the reliability of data, the verification of methods, responsibility in interpreting results, and considering them in the context of other studies.

From 1960 to 1972, she worked at the Institute of Phytopathology.

In 1965, she became a Candidate of Biological Sciences.

From 1973, she worked at the Department of Zoology and Ecology of the Faculty of Biology and Chemistry at the MSPI. She became a professor in 1975. All graduates of the "biochim" faculty remember Nina Mikhailovna's lectures on ecology and the theory of evolution.

In 1976, she defended her doctoral dissertation.

From 1992 to 2003, she simultaneously:

- headed the Department of Biology at the International Independent Ecological and Political University, where she taught courses on ecology and the evolution of the biosphere.
- lectured on ecology at the D. I. Mendeleev University of Chemical Technology of Russia.

For many years, she edited numerous monographs, collections, identification guides, and other works on soil zoology. She supervised hundreds of diploma students and more than 40 postgraduate students, who became Candidates of Biological and Geographical Sciences.

She authored several monographs, textbooks, and teaching aids for higher and secondary schools. As the Chair of the Educational and Methodological Commission on Biology of the USSR and Russia, she contributed significantly to the organization of ecological education in the USSR and Russia. N. M. Chernova believed in the importance of an ecology course in schools, integrating natural science subjects and contributing to the development of a worldview.

She died on 9 August 2010 in Moscow. She was buried in Moscow at the Khovanskoye Cemetery.

== Scientific contributions ==
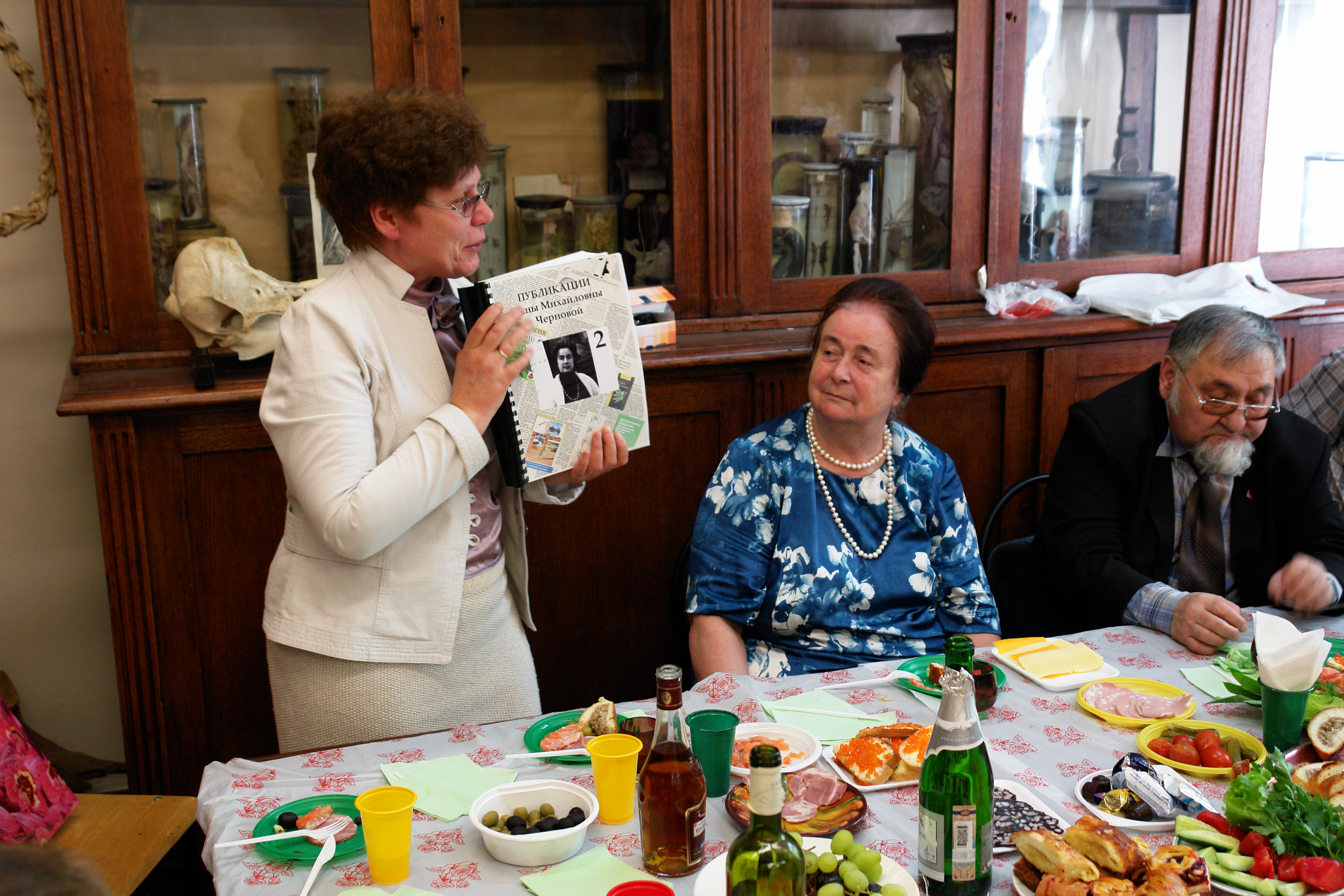
N. Chernova in 2010

Chernova was affiliated with the Moscow State Pedagogical University (MPGU), where she contributed to both research and teaching. She was a leading figure in the scientific school of Merkury Sergeevich Gilyarov, a renowned soil zoologist.

Chernova's research focused on the ecology of soil invertebrates, particularly Collembola and Oribatid mites. She studied their role in soil formation, decomposition processes, and ecological succession. Her work also explored the dynamics of soil microarthropod populations and their responses to environmental changes.

Some of her key contributions include: - Investigating the role of composts in enriching soil fauna. - Studying the vertical distribution of soil microarthropods in forest ecosystems. - Analyzing the ecological succession of soil invertebrates during the decomposition of organic matter. - Developing principles for the organization of soil-dwelling Collembola communities.

== Educational contributions ==
Chernova was deeply involved in ecological education. She authored several textbooks and methodological guides for students and teachers, including: - Fundamentals of Ecology (1995), a widely used textbook for secondary schools. - Laboratory Workshop on Ecology (1986), a practical guide for students.

She also contributed to the development of ecological education standards in Russia and advocated for the integration of ecological principles into school curricula.

== Selected publications ==
Chernova authored and co-authored numerous scientific papers and books. Below is a selection of her notable works:

Books:

- Chernova, Nina M. (1966). Zoological Characteristics of Composts. Moscow: Nauka. p. 154.
- Chernova, Nina M. (1977). Ecological Successions During Plant Residue Decomposition. Moscow: Nauka. p. 200.
- Chernova, Nina M.; Bylova, A. M. (1981). Ecology: A Textbook for Students of Pedagogical Institutes. Moscow: Prosveshchenie. p. 255.
- Chernova, Nina M.; Bylova, A. M. (2004). General Ecology: A Textbook for Students of Pedagogical Institutes. Moscow: Drofa. p. 412.

Selected Papers:

- Chernova, Nina M. (1963). "Dynamics of Collembola Abundance in Leaf Litter Composts". Zoological Journal. 9: 1370–1382.
- Chernova, Nina M. (1971). "Biomass Levels of Microarthropods in Environments with Different Organic Matter Content". Proceedings of the 13th International Entomological Congress. 1: 570–571.
- Chernova, Nina M.; Kuznetsova, N. A. (2000). "Collembolan Community Organization and Its Temporal Predictability". Pedobiologia. 44 (3–4): 451–466. doi:10.1078/S0031-4056(04)70060-9 (inactive 1 July 2025).

== Legacy ==
Nina Chernova's work laid the foundation for further research in soil zoology and ecology. Her studies on Collembola and soil microarthropods remain influential in the field. She also inspired a generation of ecologists and educators through her teaching and mentorship.

Several new species of Collembola named after her:

- Ghirkanura chernovae Kuznetsova et Potapov, 1988 — Neanuridae
- Supraphorura chernovae Gulgenova et Potapov, 2023 — Onychiuridae

== Literature ==
- Kuznetsova N. A., and M. B. Potapov. Nina Mikhailovna Chernova. Russian Entomological Journal 19, no. 3 (2010): 167–174.
- Makarova O. L., and A. B. Babenko. Losses to Science: Nina Mikhailovna Chernova (16 May 1935 – 9 August 2010). Zoologicheskii Zhurnal 90, no. 2 (2011): 254–256.
- Zhigarev I. A., N. A. Kuznetsova, and V. M. Galushin. Professor N. M. Chernova (1935–2010). Zhurnal Obshchei Biologii 73, no. 2 (2012): 159–160.
- Chernova, Nina Mikhailovna. In Figures of Pedagogical Science and Education — Employees and Alumni of Moscow State Pedagogical University: Biographical Encyclopedia 1872–2012, 467–468. Moscow: Prometei, 2012.
- Vtorov I. P, A. B. Babenko , A. I. Bokova, et al. The History of N. M. Chernova’s Scientific School of Soil Zoology at the Moscow Pedagogical State University. Chinese Annals of History of Science and Technology, 2025, 9 (2): 133-160. DOI: 10.3724/SP.J.1461.2025.02133
