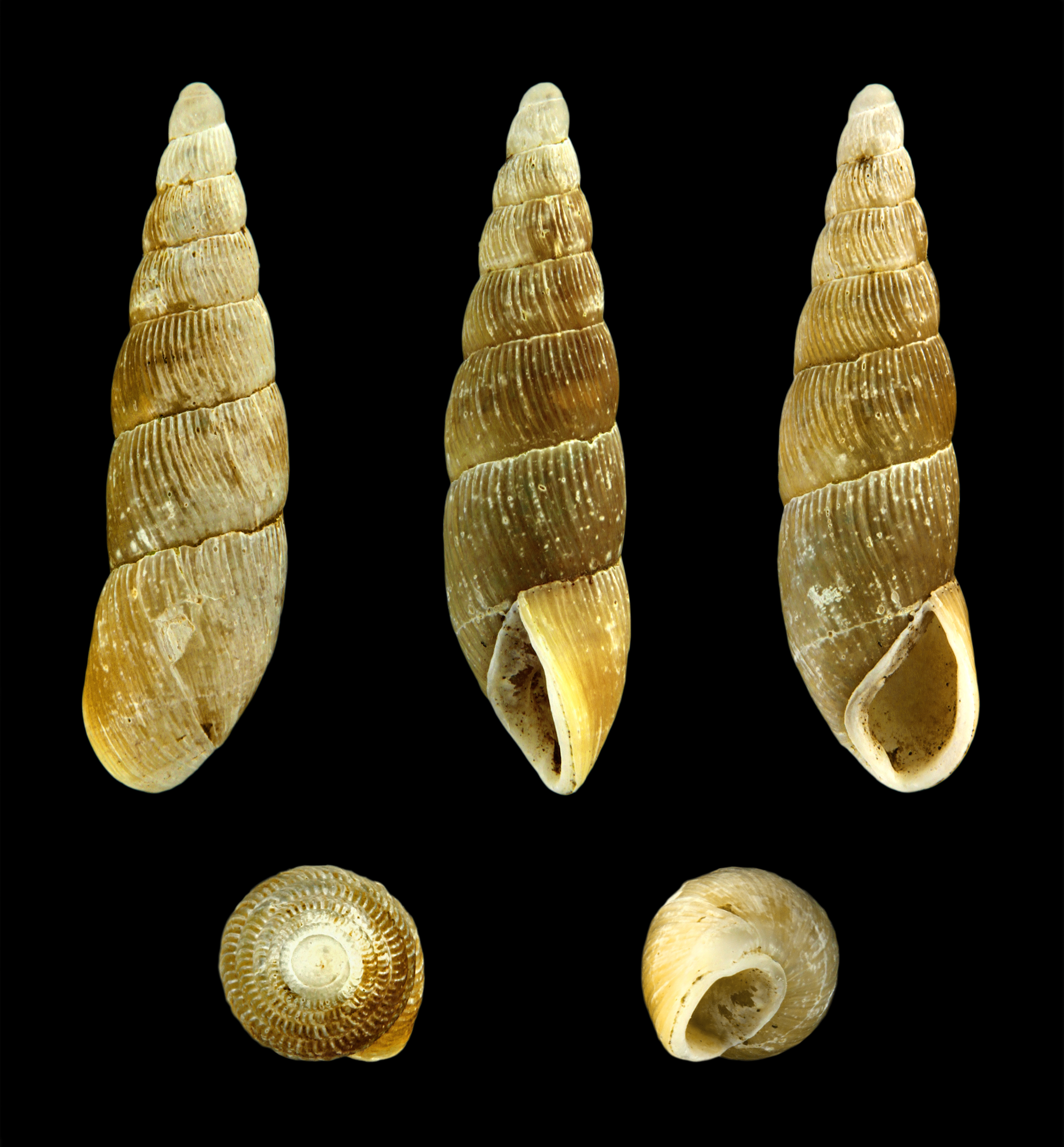

Conservation status
- Near Threatened (IUCN 3.1)

Scientific classification
- Kingdom: Animalia
- Phylum: Mollusca
- Class: Gastropoda
- Order: Stylommatophora
- Family: Ferussaciidae
- Genus: Sculptiferussacia
- Species: S. clausiliaeformis

Binomial name
- Sculptiferussacia clausiliaeformis Alonso & Ibáñez, 1992

= Sculptiferussacia clausiliaeformis =

Species of gastropod

Sculptiferussacia clausiliaeformis is a species of land snail in the family Ferussaciidae. It is endemic to the Canary Islands, where it is found only on Jandía, a peninsula on the island of Fuerteventura.

This snail is found at five sites high on the slopes of mountains. Its total range is less than 20 square kilometers. The habitat is located on steep mountain cliffs and is an area of high rainfall. It is threatened by grazing goats and by the creation of hiking trails for tourists.
