= Cecilioides connollyi =

Conservation status
- Vulnerable (IUCN 3.1)

Scientific classification
- Kingdom: Animalia
- Phylum: Mollusca
- Class: Gastropoda
- Order: Stylommatophora
- Family: Ferussaciidae
- Genus: Cecilioides
- Species: C. connollyi

Binomial name
- Cecilioides connollyi Tomlin, 1943

Synonyms
- Cecilioides (Cecilioides) connollyi Tomlin, 1943

Species of gastropod

Cecilioides connollyi is a species of land snail in the family Ferussaciidae. It is a vulnerable species endemic to Gibraltar.
