= Cecilioides eulima =

Conservation status
- Critically Endangered (IUCN 3.1)

Scientific classification
- Kingdom: Animalia
- Phylum: Mollusca
- Class: Gastropoda
- Order: Stylommatophora
- Family: Ferussaciidae
- Genus: Cecilioides
- Species: C. eulima

Binomial name
- Cecilioides eulima (Lowe, 1854)

Synonyms
- Achatina eulima Lowe, 1855; Cecilioides (Terebrella) eulima (Lowe, 1855)

Species of gastropod

Cecilioides eulima is a species of very small air-breathing land snail, a terrestrial pulmonate gastropod mollusk in the family Ferussaciidae. It is a critically endangered species endemic to the Madeira Archipelago.
