= Shelton Hospital fire =

1968 hospital fire in Shrewsbury, England

Coordinates: 52°42′45″N 2°47′59″W

- Date: 26 February 1968
- Location: Shelton Hospital, Shelton, Shrewsbury
- Deaths: 21
- Injuries: 14

The Shelton Hospital fire was a fatal blaze on 26 February 1968 at the Shelton Hospital, Shelton, Shrewsbury, that killed 21 female patients.

== Fire ==
A fire was reported in the women's wing soon after midnight on 26 February 1968. By the time that appliances from the Shrewsbury Fire Brigade had arrived, the fire had taken hold over two floors of the wing. A spokesman for the fire brigade reported that 70 firemen had been involved, and the fire was under control by 02:00, two rooms had been severely damaged. Twenty patients died in the fire, and another died in hospital. A total of 140 patients were evacuated from the wing. A further 14 women were injured.

== Investigation ==
An investigation report found that the night staff had no training in evacuation and the Shrewsbury Fire Brigade reported that a ten-minute delay between the night nurse finding the fire and the alarm being raised contributed to the number of deaths, mainly from smoke inhalation. It was believed that the fire started from a discarded cigarette end. The report found that staffing at the hospital was "on the low side," and locking patients into wards was accepted practice, although the 1959 Mental Health Act said the number that needed to be locked in would be as few as possible. A review of fire safety procedures in hospitals in the Midlands was held after this fire.
