= Cecilioides nyctelia =

Conservation status
- Data Deficient (IUCN 2.3)

Scientific classification
- Kingdom: Animalia
- Phylum: Mollusca
- Class: Gastropoda
- Order: Stylommatophora
- Family: Ferussaciidae
- Genus: Cecilioides
- Species: C. nyctelia

Binomial name
- Cecilioides nyctelia (Bourguignat, 1856)

Species of gastropod

Cecilioides nyctelia is a species of very small air-breathing land snail, a terrestrial pulmonate gastropod mollusk in the family Ferussaciidae.

== Distribution ==
This species is endemic to Madeira, Portugal.
