= Cylichnidia ovuliformis =

Conservation status
- Vulnerable (IUCN 3.1)

Scientific classification
- Kingdom: Animalia
- Phylum: Mollusca
- Class: Gastropoda
- Order: Stylommatophora
- Family: Ferussaciidae
- Genus: Cylichnidia
- Species: C. ovuliformis

Binomial name
- Cylichnidia ovuliformis (R.T. Lowe, 1831)

Species of gastropod

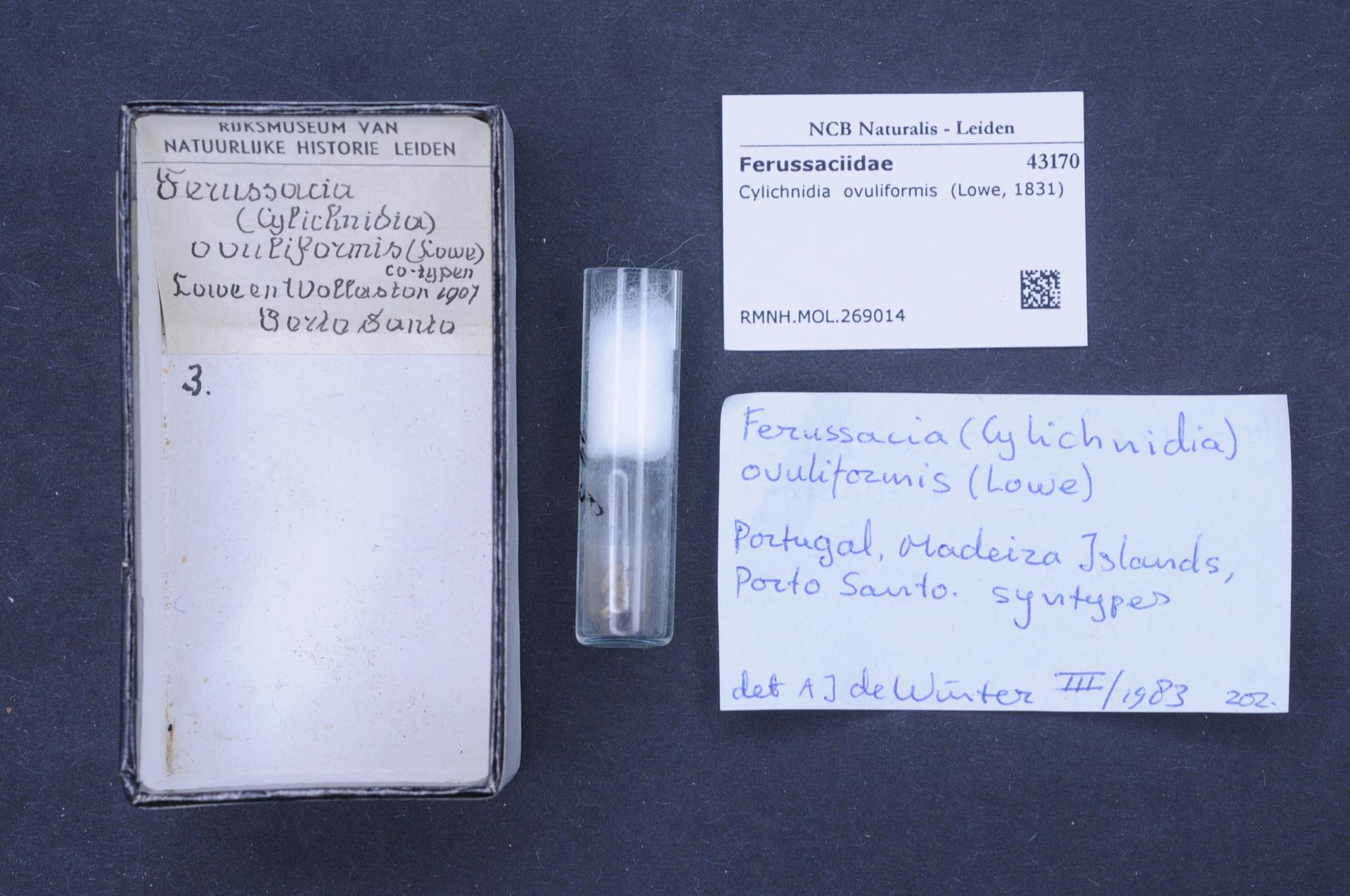
Specimen of Cylichnidia ovuliformis held at the Naturalis Biodiversity Center

Cylichnidia ovuliformis is a species of land snail in the family Ferussaciidae. It is endemic to Madeira, where it is known only from Porto Santo Island.

The snail has been recorded at five sites on mountain slopes on the island. It lives on the ground, often under rocks, logs, and leaf litter. In some places it is threatened by habitat disturbance from nearby plantations.
