= Cecilioides petitiana =

Scientific classification
- Domain: Eukaryota
- Kingdom: Animalia
- Phylum: Mollusca
- Class: Gastropoda
- Order: Stylommatophora
- Suborder: Achatinina
- Superfamily: Achatinoidea
- Family: Ferussaciidae
- Genus: Cecilioides
- Species: C. petitiana

Binomial name
- Cecilioides petitiana (Benoit, 1862)

Synonyms
- Cecilioides petitianus

Species of gastropod

Cecilioides petitiana is a species of air-breathing land snail, a pulmonate gastropod mollusk in the family Ferussaciidae.

This is a subterranean species.

== Distribution ==
- Slovakia
