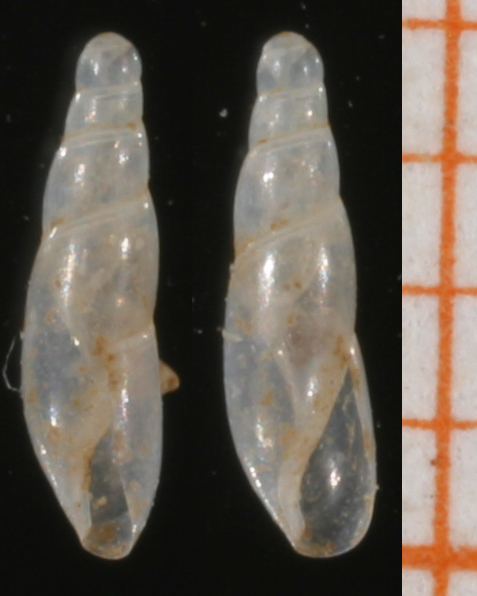
- Two fresh shells of Cecilioides acicula, the scale bar is in millimeters

Conservation status
- Least Concern (IUCN 3.1) (Europe regional assessment)

- Secure (NatureServe)

Scientific classification
- Kingdom: Animalia
- Phylum: Mollusca
- Class: Gastropoda
- Order: Stylommatophora
- Family: Ferussaciidae
- Genus: Cecilioides
- Species: C. acicula

Binomial name
- Cecilioides acicula (O. F. Müller, 1774)

Synonyms
- Caecilianella acicula (Müller)

= Cecilioides acicula =

Species of gastropod

Cecilioides acicula, also known as the blind snail or blind awlsnail, is a subterranean species of small, air-breathing land snail. It is a terrestrial pulmonate gastropod mollusk in the family Ferussaciidae.

== Description ==
Cecilioides acicula is white, eyeless, and has two pairs of tentacles.

Their shell is long and narrow, with a maximum length of 5.5 mm and a maximum width of 1.2 mm. Fresh shells are colorless, glassy and transparent, while older shells are an opaque milky-white.

== Habitat ==
Cecilioides acicula is a subterranean species, most commonly found in soils with a high level of calcium.

Due to its subterranean habitat, this species is often found as an empty shell in places such as mole hills, ant hills, or in flood debris of rivers.

== Distribution ==
The native range of Cecilioides acicula is Mediterranean Europe, specifically Western Europe (Great Britain and Ireland, Netherlands,) and Central Europe (Czech Republic, Poland, Slovakia, Ukraine).

It has also been accidentally introduced to several non-native countries:

- Latvia since 2006
- Bermuda since 1861
- Canada (Ontario)
- The United States (Pennsylvania, Florida, Maryland since 1959, Virginia since 2006, California, New Jersey and New Mexico.)
- New Zealand
- Australia
