= Copthorne, Shropshire =

Suburb of Shrewsbury, England

Coordinates: 52.710468°N 2.7656901°W

Copthorne
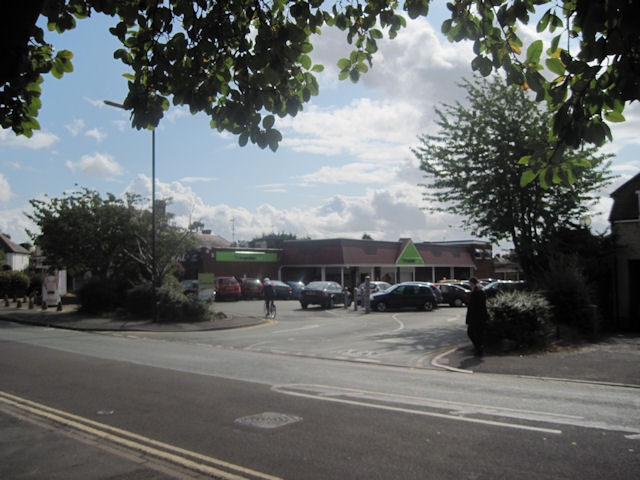
- Copthorne shops

- Location within Shropshire
- Population: 4,105 (2011)
- OS grid reference: SJ483128
- Unitary authority: Shropshire
- Ceremonial county: Shropshire
- Region: West Midlands
- Country: England
- Sovereign state: United Kingdom
- Post town: Shrewsbury
- Postcode district: SY3
- Dialling code: 01743
- Police: West Mercia
- Fire: Shropshire
- Ambulance: West Midlands
- UK Parliament: Shrewsbury

Copthorne is a suburb located in the western side of the county town of Shrewsbury, Shropshire, England. The population of the ward at the 2011 Census was 4,105.

== Description ==
Surrounding Copthorne Road, Mytton Oak Road and Shelton Road, the suburb is mainly residential and runs from the junction where Copthorne Bank meets New Street, in the north east near Frankwell Island, to the Royal Shrewsbury Hospital (previously known as Copthorne Hospital) and the suburb of Shelton to the west, on the outskirts of town and the Radbrook Road separates Copthorne and Radbrook in the south of Copthorne.

From Frankwell, New Street runs south-west for a short way, ending by the Boat House public house and Port Hill Footbridge (leading to The Quarry). The road (the A488) continues up Porthill as Porthill Road, along the edge of the Shrewsbury School grounds, and ends at the former A5 road, the Shrewsbury bypass.

On the east side of the suburb, Copthorne Road leads from Frankwell Island, to the west up Copthorne Bank, along past the remnant of Copthorne Barracks (former headquarters of the British Army's 5th Division and 143 (West Midlands) Brigade and current headquarters of Shrewsbury Air Training Corps and the Shropshire Army Cadet Force) and the Copthorne Keep housing development that has been built on most of the barracks site, and also ends up joining the old bypass at Shelton Road.

In the suburb are many residential streets, the Sandringham Court apartment development, several small shops and public houses, a tennis club, and two schools (Woodfield Infants School and St George's Junior School).

Furthermore, on Mytton Oak Road, near the Hospital, there is the Copthorne Shopping Centre. This small development consists of a post office, Co-op supermarket, pharmacy, fish and chip shop, hairdresser and Coral (Bookmakers). On Woodfield Road by the two schools there is also Woodfield Stores, formerly known as Everington's and Mace. As well as this there is Oakfield Shopping Centre, off Oakfield Road, with a Chinese Takeaway, fitness centre and Scout and Cub Hut.

Copthorne is located in the Church of England parish of Christ Church Shelton and Oxon.

== Sport ==
Shrewsbury Town Football Club twice had their ground in Copthorne; on Ambler's Field 1889-93 and, after an interval in Sutton Lane, Sutton Farm, on the so-called Barracks Ground (south of Copthorne Barracks) 1895-1910 before their move to the Gay Meadow.

== Notable residents ==
- William Snook, English champion runner, was living at West View, Copthorne, at the 1881 Census.
- Arthur Herbert Procter, Victoria Cross recipient World War I, lived in Mytton Oak Road in later 1960s before relocating to Sheffield.
- Arthur Rowley, the Football League's highest scoring player, settled in Copthorne, having first come to the area as a Shrewsbury Town player, and died there in 2004.
