= Sheldon =

Sheldon may refer to:

== People and fictional characters ==
- Sheldon (name), a given name and a surname, and a list of people and fictional characters with the name

== Places ==
=== Antarctica ===
- Sheldon Glacier, Adelaide Island

=== Australia ===
- Sheldon, Queensland, a rural residential locality in Redland City
- Sheldon Forest, New South Wales

=== United Kingdom ===
- Sheldon, Derbyshire, England, a village and civil parish
- Sheldon, Devon, England, a village and civil parish
- Sheldon, West Midlands, England
- Sheldon stone circle, Aberdeenshire, Scotland

=== United States ===
- Sheldon, Illinois, a village
- Sheldon, Iowa, a city
- Sheldon, Minnesota, an unincorporated community
- Sheldon, Missouri, a city
- Sheldon, New York, a town
- Sheldon, North Dakota, a city
- Sheldon, South Carolina, an unincorporated community and census-designated place
- Sheldon, Texas, an unincorporated community
- Sheldon, Vermont, a town
- Sheldon, Monroe County, Wisconsin, a town
- Sheldon, Rusk County, Wisconsin, a village
- Sheldon Township, Iroquois County, Illinois
- Sheldon Township, Houston County, Minnesota
- Mount Sheldon, Alaska
- Sheldon Lake, northeast of downtown Houston, Texas
- Sheldon National Wildlife Refuge, Nevada

== Schools ==
- Sheldon School, a mixed secondary school and sixth form in Chippenham, Wiltshire, England
- Sheldon High School (disambiguation), several schools in the United States
- Sheldon College, a private day school in Sheldon, Queensland

== Other uses ==
- Sheldon coin grading scale
- Sheldon Museum of Art, Lincoln, Nebraska, United States
- The Sheldon, a concert hall and art galleries in St. Louis, Missouri, United States
- Sheldon Inn, a former building in Canton Township, Michigan, on the National Register of Historic Places
- Sheldon Theatre, Red Wing, Minnesota, United States, on the National Register of Historic Places
- Sheldon Hall, Birmingham, an early 16th-century Grade II* listed manor house in Birmingham, England
- Sheldon Manor, Chippenham, Wiltshire, England
- Sheldon (webcomic), created by Dave Kellett
- Sheldon, a character from the video game Splatoon

== See also ==
- Sheldon Gang, a Chicago crime gang formed at the start of Prohibition
- Sheldon spectrum, a feature in marine biology
- Shelton (disambiguation)
- Shelldon, an animated television series
- UK Sheldon Association www.sheldonfamily.org.uk Free help to trace Sheldon ancestors in the UK.
- Sheldon Genealogy www.sheldongenealogy.org Free help to trace Sheldon ancestors in USA.
- American Sheldon Family Association www.sheldonfamily.org Membership based Sheldon Association in USA.
