= Deuteraphorura kruberaensis =

Scientific classification
- Domain: Eukaryota
- Kingdom: Animalia
- Phylum: Arthropoda
- Class: Collembola
- Order: Poduromorpha
- Family: Onychiuridae
- Genus: Deuteraphorura
- Species: D. kruberaensis

Binomial name
- Deuteraphorura kruberaensis Jordana & Baquero, 2012

Species of springtail

Deuteraphorura kruberaensis is a species of springtails belonging to the family Onychiuridae. It is endemic to the Krubera-Voronja cave system in Georgia. It is one of the deepest terrestrial animals ever found on Earth, living at >1,800 metres (5,900 ft) below the cave entrance. It was discovered in the CAVEX Team expedition of 2010.

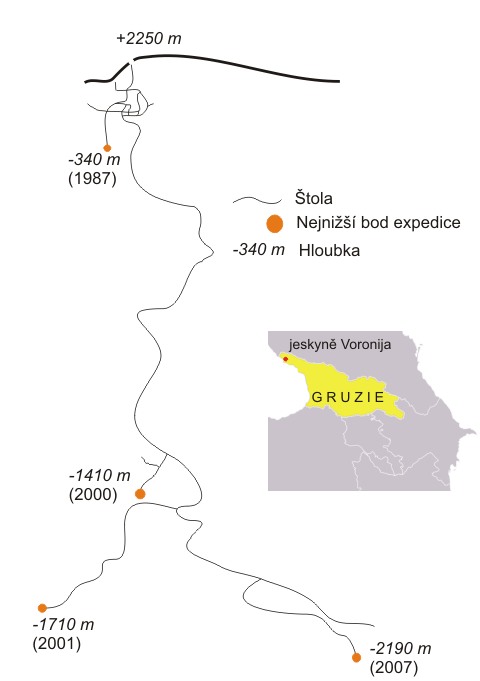
Voronija caves
