= Inessa Sharova =

Soviet and Russian entomologist (1931–2021)

- Инесса Шарова
- Born: Inessa Pukit; October 28, 1931; Moscow, Russian SFSR, Soviet Union
- Died: June 22, 2021 (aged 89) ?
- Resting place: Novodevichy Cemetery
- Education: Moscow Pedagogical State University
- Known for: Ground beetle study
- Scientific career
- Fields: Entomology
- Workplaces: Moscow Pedagogical State University
- Doctoral advisor: Mercury Ghilarov
- Author abbrev. (zoology): Charova

Inessa Khristianovna Sharova (Russian: Инесса Христиановна Шарова; née Pukit; 28 October 1931 – 22 June 2021) was a Soviet and Russian entomologist, Doctor of Biological Sciences, and a leading specialist in the morphology, ecology, and systematics of ground beetles (Carabidae). She was a key figure in the Soviet and Russian Scientific School of soil insects (Ground beetle), a long-time professor at the Moscow Pedagogical State University, and the scientific leader of the Moscow group of carabidologists.

== Biography ==
=== Early life and education ===
Sharova was born in Moscow and spent her childhood in the city's Prechistenka and Arbat districts before her family was evacuated to Mordovia during World War II. In 1949, she entered the Faculty of Natural Sciences at the V.I. Lenin Moscow State Pedagogical Institute, graduating with honors in 1953. It was there she began working under Academician Mercury Sergeyevich Ghilarov, the founder of soil zoology, which determined her scientific career. Her early research involved extensive field trips across the USSR studying soil invertebrates, particularly the larvae of ground beetles.

In 1953, she entered graduate school at the same institute under Ghilarov's supervision. She defended her Candidate of Science (PhD) dissertation, "Larvae of ground beetles useful and harmful in agriculture," in 1958, also publishing the first monograph in the USSR on ground beetle larvae. Materials from her dissertation were later included in the collective monograph "The larvae of soil-dwelling insects," which was awarded a USSR State Prize.

=== Academic career ===
In 1957, Sharova joined the Department of Zoology and Evolution Theory (later the Department of Zoology and Ecology) at her alma mater, where she worked for the rest of her life, rising from assistant to professor and head of the department (1983–2005). She was also the Dean of the Faculty of Biology and Chemistry from 1974 to 1984.

She defended her Doctor of Science (Habilitation) thesis, "Life forms of ground beetles (Coleoptera, Carabidae)," in 1974. The subsequent monograph of the same title, published in 1981, became a foundational work that influenced the study of carabid life forms both in the USSR and internationally.

As an educator, she developed and taught courses in invertebrate zoology, evolutionary theory, entomology, and ecological morphology. She was the author of the textbook "Invertebrate Zoology" (1999) and authored or co-authored 12 monographs, over 200 research papers, and 17 textbooks.

=== Scientific contributions ===
Sharova was a central figure in the Ghilarov scientific school of soil zoology. Her primary research focused on the morphology, taxonomy, and ecology of carabid beetles, with a special emphasis on their larvae and life forms. She collaborated with leading international carabidologists and trained numerous students through field expeditions across the Soviet Union and Russia.

Together with Oleg L. Kryzhanovsky, she organized a series of All-Union Carabidological Meetings and was the executive editor of nine collections of research papers on carabid ecology. She also held memberships in dissertation councils, the Expert Council of the Higher Attestation Commission, and the editorial board of the Entomological Review.

Under her supervision, 30 postgraduate students defended Candidate of Science (PhD) theses and six defended Doctor of Science theses. Her students and followers work in various cities across Russia and in other countries, including the US, Canada, Bulgaria, and the Czech Republic.

== Awards and honors ==
- Badge "Excellence in Public Education" (1979)
- Badge "Excellence in Education in the USSR" (1981)
- Medal "In Commemoration of the 850th Anniversary of Moscow" (1997)
- Medal "Veteran of Labour"
- Honored Worker of Higher Professional Education of the Russian Federation (2003)

== Selected publications ==
- Sharova, I.Kh. (1958). Larvae of ground beetles useful and harmful in agriculture. (Monograph).
- Sharova, I.Kh. (1981). Life forms of ground beetles (Coleoptera, Carabidae). Moscow: Nauka. (Monograph).
- Sharova, I.Kh. (1999). Invertebrate Zoology. Textbook for pedagogical universities.
