= Deuteraphorura bizkaiensis =

Scientific classification
- Domain: Eukaryota
- Kingdom: Animalia
- Phylum: Arthropoda
- Class: Collembola
- Order: Poduromorpha
- Family: Onychiuridae
- Genus: Deuteraphorura
- Species: D. bizkaiensis

Binomial name
- Deuteraphorura bizkaiensis Beruete, Jordana & Arbea, 2021

Species of springtail

Deuteraphorura bizkaiensis is a species of springtail belonging to the family Onychiuridae. Its type locality is the Otxas cave in Igorre, Basque Country, Spain.
