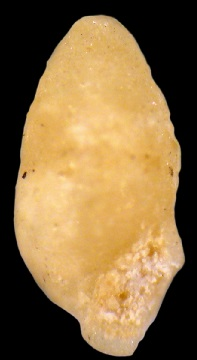
- A fossil shell of Cecilioides sommeri

Scientific classification
- Domain: Eukaryota
- Kingdom: Animalia
- Phylum: Mollusca
- Class: Gastropoda
- Order: Stylommatophora
- Suborder: Achatinina
- Superfamily: Achatinoidea
- Family: Ferussaciidae
- Genus: Cecilioides
- Species: C. sommeri

Binomial name
- Cecilioides sommeri (Ferreira & Coelho, 1971)

Synonyms
- Carychium sommeri

= Cecilioides sommeri =

Cecilioides sommeri Temporal range: Paleocene

Extinct species of gastropod

Cecilioides sommeri is a fossil species of minute air-breathing land snail, a terrestrial pulmonate gastropod mollusk in the family Ferussaciidae, from the Paleocene deposits of the Itaboraí Basin, in Brazil. This is the oldest known species in the family.
