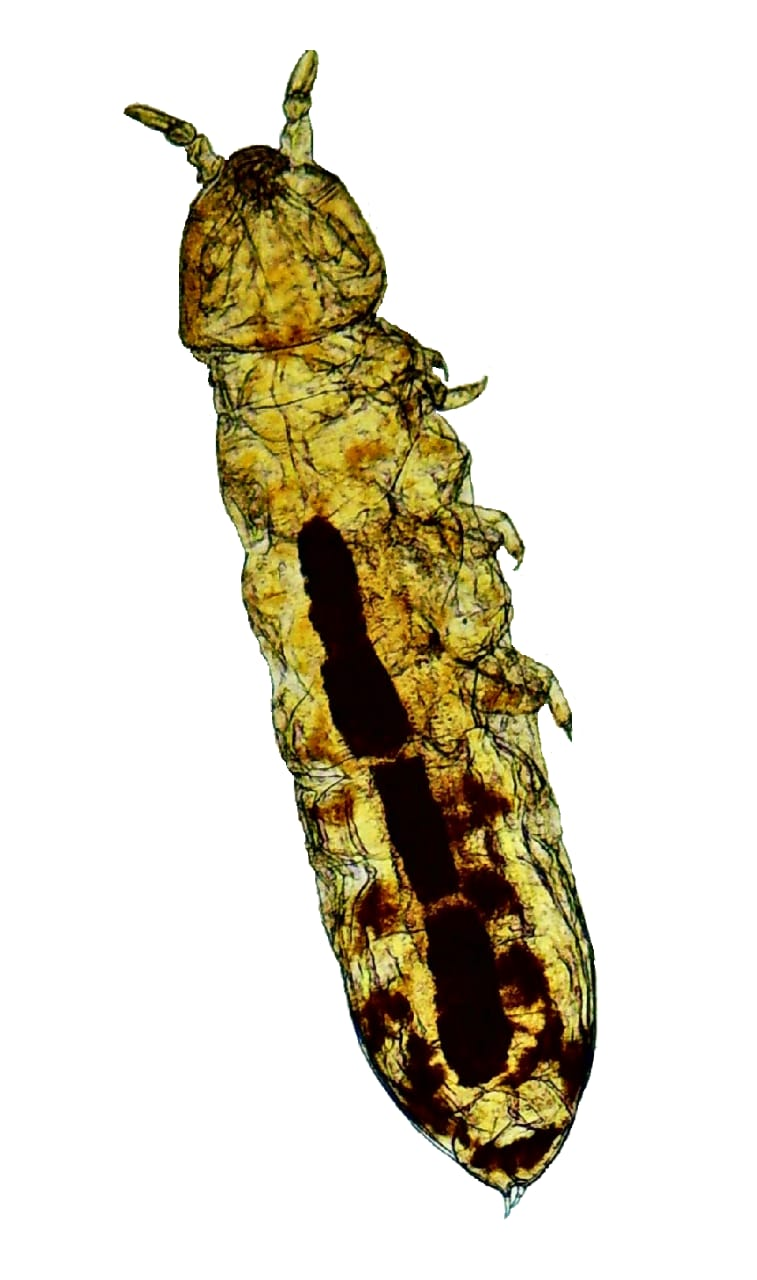
- Bionychiurus tamilensis

Scientific classification
- Kingdom: Animalia
- Phylum: Arthropoda
- Class: Collembola
- Order: Poduromorpha
- Family: Onychiuridae
- Tribe: Onychiurini
- Genus: Bionychiurus; Pomorski, RJ, 1996

Species
- See text

= Bionychiurus =

Genus of the family Onychiuridae

Bionychiurus is a genus of the family Onychiuridae, a group of springtails. Genus Bionychiurus was established by Pomoroski in the year 1996, based on the morphological features of the first instar larvae of Onychiurus normalis. Later, Weiner established a new genus Bangallophorus based on O. normalis; but Pomorski synonymized Bangallophorus with Bionychiurus in 1998.

== Species ==
The following species are accepted within Bionychiurus:

- Bionychiurus changbaiensis Sun & Wu, 2012
- Bionychiurus normalis (Gisin, 1949)
- Bionychiurus oblongatus (Lee & Park, 1986)
- Bionychiurus orghidani (Gruia, M, 1967)
- Bionychiurus qinglongensis Sun, X & Wu, D-H, 2014
- Bionychiurus tamilensis Thunnisa et al., 2021
- Bionychiurus yongyeonensis (Yosii, R, 1966)
