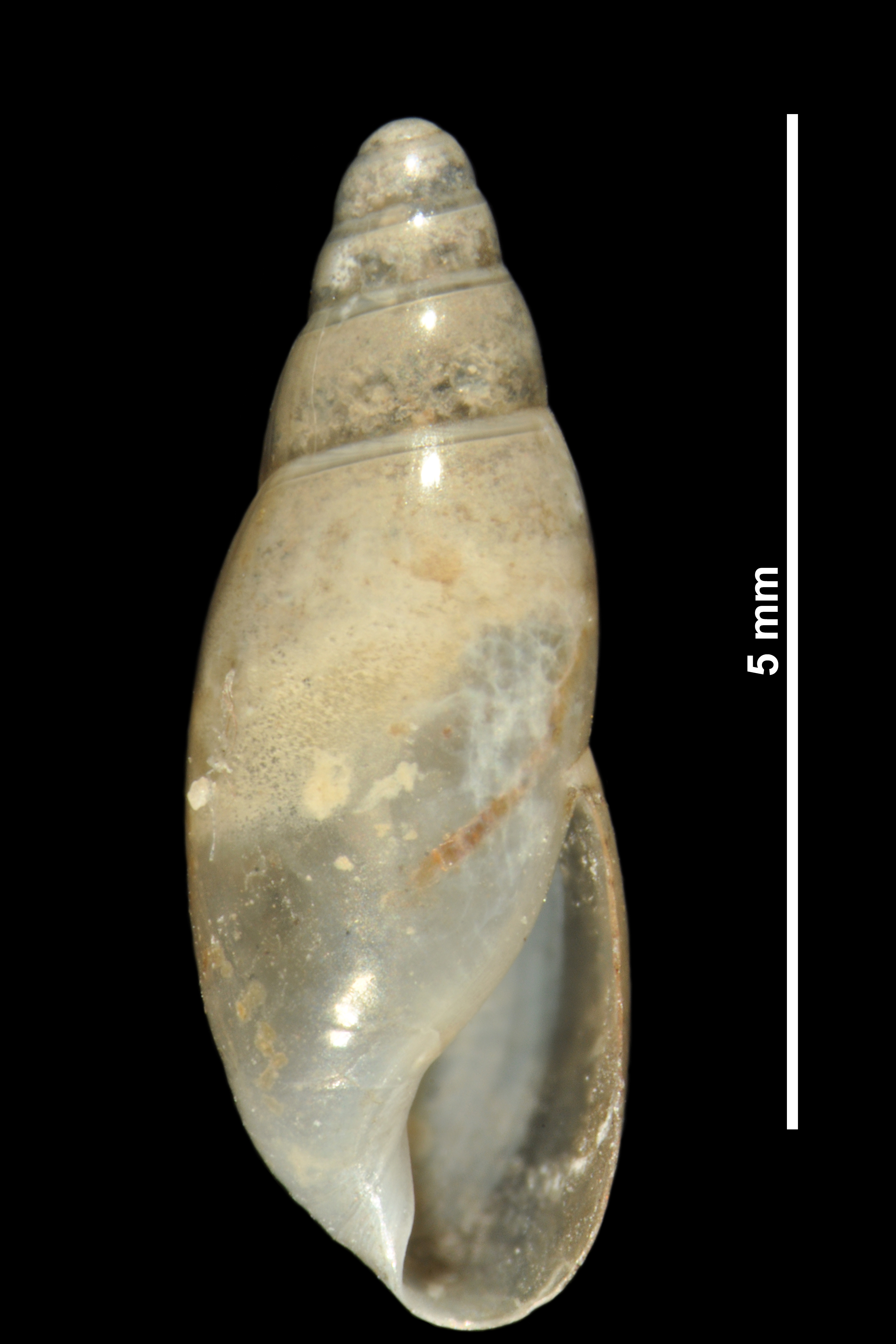
- Shell of Hohenwartiana hohenwarti (specimen at MNHN, Paris)

Scientific classification
- Kingdom: Animalia
- Phylum: Mollusca
- Class: Gastropoda
- Order: Stylommatophora
- Suborder: Achatinina
- Superfamily: Achatinoidea
- Family: Ferussaciidae
- Genus: Hohenwartiana; Bourguignat, 1864

Synonyms
- Hohenwarthia (incorrect subsequent spelling)

= Hohenwartiana =

Genus of gastropods

Hohenwartiana is a genus of air-breathing land snails, terrestrial pulmonate gastropod mollusks in the family Ferussaciidae.

== Species ==
Species within the genus Hohenwartiana include:

- Hohenwartiana aradasiana (Benoit, 1862)
- Hohenwartiana disparata (Westerlund, 1892)
- Hohenwartiana hohenwarti (Rossmässler, 1839)

Species brought into synonymy

- Hohenwartiana buccinula (Grateloup, 1828) †: synonym of Achatina buccinula Grateloup, 1828 † (new combination not accepted; status uncertain)
- Hohenwartiana orghidani Grossu, 1955: synonym of Cecilioides (Cecilioides) veneta (Strobel, 1855) represented as Cecilioides veneta (Strobel, 1855) (junior synonym)
