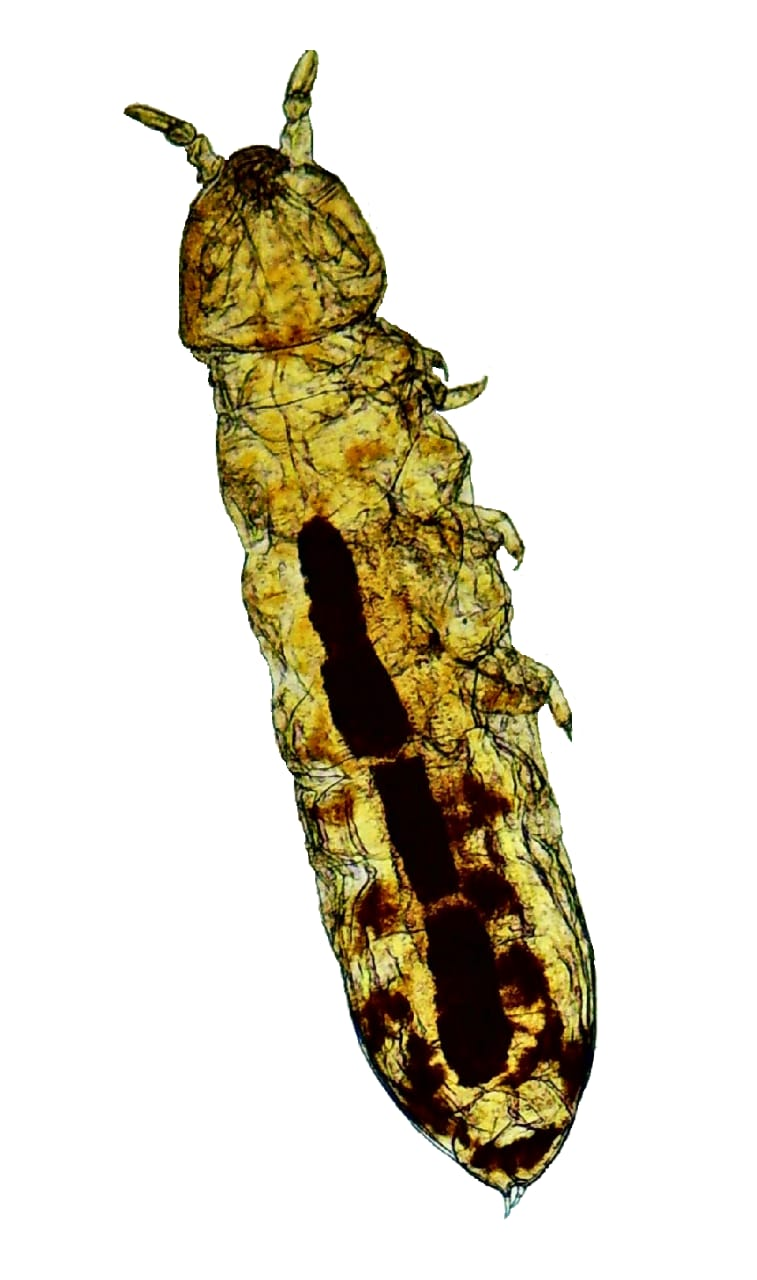

Scientific classification
- Domain: Eukaryota
- Kingdom: Animalia
- Phylum: Arthropoda
- Class: Collembola
- Order: Poduromorpha
- Family: Onychiuridae
- Genus: Bionychiurus
- Species: B. tamilensis

Binomial name
- Bionychiurus tamilensis Thunnisa et al., 2021

= Bionychiurus tamilensis =

Species of the family Onychiuridae

Bionychiurus tamilensis is a species of the family Onychiuridae, a group of springtails. Bionychiurus tamilensis has a dorsal pseudocellus (pso) formula as 32/133/33343 and a ventral pso formula as 11/011/11121. It was recorded from the Nilgiri Hills, Nilgiri Biosphere Reserve of Western Ghats, India. The status as new species of the genus Bionychiurus was confirmed molecular studies.
