= Christ Church, Shelton and Oxon =

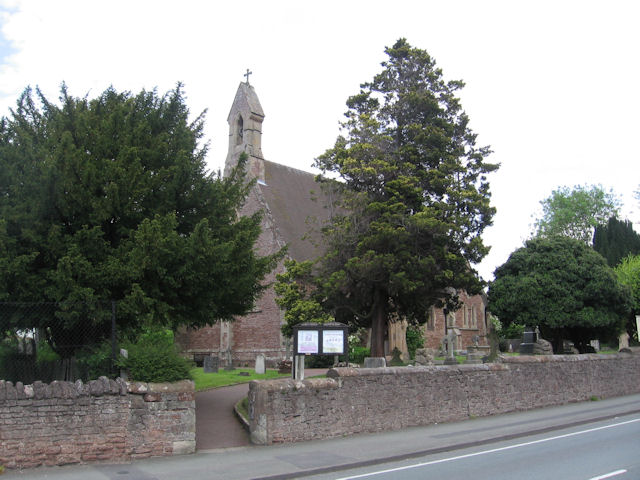
- Christ Church, Shelton and Oxon
- 52.714°N 2.802°W
- OS grid reference: SJ 45919 13227
- Location: Welshpool Road, Shrewsbury
- Country: England
- Denomination: Church of England
- Website: www.oxonparishchurch.co.uk

Architecture
- Architect: Edward Haycock Snr
- Style: Early English
- Years built: 1854

Administration
- Diocese: Lichfield

Clergy
- Vicar: Charlotte Gompertz

The parish of Christ Church, Shelton and Oxon, lies within the Diocese of Lichfield, in the county of Shropshire, England.

The parish church was built in 1854 by Edward Haycock Snr in Early English style with many lancet features. It is located on Welshpool Road in what is now suburban Shrewsbury, and is a Grade II listed building. The exterior has rubble walls with ashlar dressings. There is a bellcote and a gabled porch. The interior has a scissor-braced roof, an elaborate ashlar reredos (begun in 1886 and not completed until 1904), an ashlary pulpit with a pelican motif, an octagonal ashlar font, and stained glass windows (from 1884, 1948, and 1967). A new stained glass window was placed above the chancel arch to celebrate the new millennium in 2001

The churchyard contains the war graves of two airmen and a Herefordshire Regiment soldier of 45631

The parish has a population of about 8500 whilst the church has seating for 150. The church was built to cater for those cut off by flooding of the River Severn, on an area of land called the "Windmill Field." The parish was formed from that of St Chad's Church, Shrewsbury, and includes the former townships of Crowmeole, Woodcote and Horton, Bicton Heath, and Copthorne. Parish boundaries were adjusted in 1957. The boundaries were redrawn in the early 21st century to reflect population growth.

In 2004 the church celebrated 150 years by planting a new Oxon Oak.

The church is linked to the Oxon Church of England Primary School, which opened next to the church in 1860, but moved to nearby Racecourse Lane in 1959.
