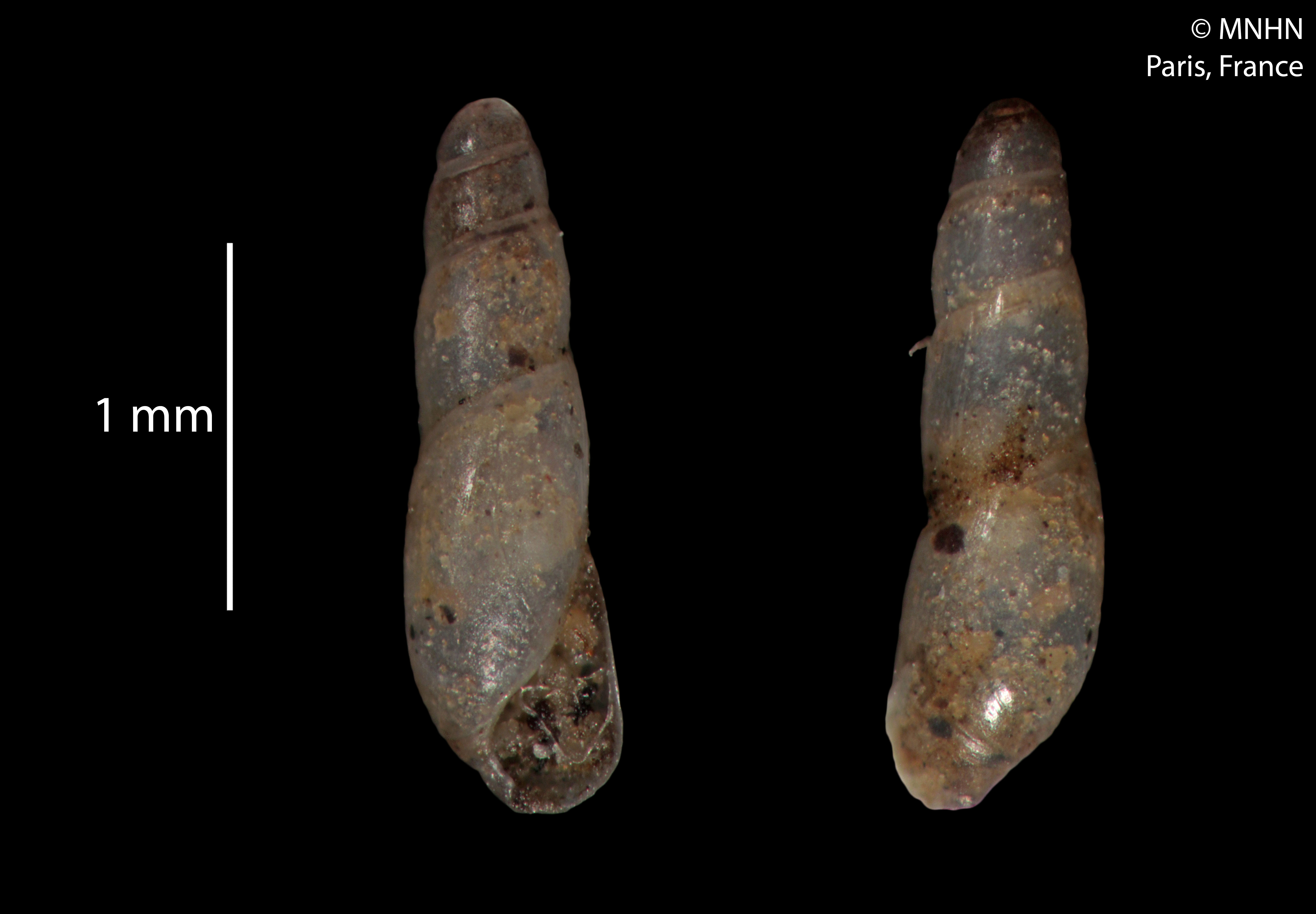
- Shell of Geostilbia sheilae (paratype at MNHN, Paris)

Scientific classification
- Kingdom: Animalia
- Phylum: Mollusca
- Class: Gastropoda
- Order: Stylommatophora
- Suborder: Achatinina
- Superfamily: Achatinoidea
- Family: Ferussaciidae
- Genus: Geostilbia; Crosse, 1867

Type species
- Geostilbia caledonica Crosse, 1867

Synonyms
- Cecilioides (Geostilbia) Crosse, 1867

= Geostilbia =

Genus of gastropods

Geostilbia is a genus of small air-breathing land snails, terrestrial pulmonate gastropod mollusks in the family Ferussaciidae.

== Species ==
The genus Geostilbia includes the following species:

- Geostilbia aperta (Swainson, 1840)
- Geostilbia blandiana Crosse, 1886
- Geostilbia comorensis Morelet, 1883
- Geostilbia mariei Crosse, 1880
- Geostilbia moellendorffi Pilsbry, 1908
- Geostilbia philippinensis (Semper, 1874)
- Geostilbia philippinica Möllendorff, 1890
- Geostilbia sheilae Groh, 2015

Species brought into synonymy

- Geostilbia caledonica Crosse, 1867: synonym of Geostilbia gundlachi (L. Pfeiffer, 1850)
- Geostilbia gundlachi (L. Pfeiffer, 1850): synonym of Geostilbia aperta (Swainson, 1840)
- Geostilbia stuhlmanni E. von Martens, 1897: synonym of Nothapalus stuhlmanni (E. von Martens, 1897) (original combination)
