= British Premonitions Bureau =

Psychic research organisation, 1966–1968

- Established: 1966
- Founder: John Barker
- Dissolved: 1968
- Purpose: psychic research
- Location: United Kingdom
- Fields: parapsychology

The British Premonitions Bureau was formed in 1966 by psychiatrist John Barker after the Aberfan mining disaster in which 144 people, including 116 children, died when 500,000 tons of debris smashed through the Welsh town and buried the primary school. Reports of precognitive dreams foretelling of the catastrophe prompted Barker to form the bureau in the hope of predicting and avoiding future tragedies.

In the 18 months the Premonitions Bureau was open, nearly 1000 reports of premonitions were collected, and while a few seemed to foretell disasters, over 90 percent failed to predict future events and none prevented any disasters.

== History ==
John Barker worked as a psychiatrist at Shelton Hospital, a Victorian asylum housing people considered "unfit" to live in society. While Barker pushed for reforms to improve the conditions there, he engaged in unconventional research such as aversion therapy, which used electric shocks to discourage "undesirable" behavior including addiction, homosexuality, and transvestitism. Barker was a member of The Society for Psychical Research and was interested in unorthodox ideas, especially in apparent prophecies. Around the time the Aberfan disaster in Wales occurred, Barker was working on a book called Scared To Death. Earlier, the head of psychology at Harvard Medical School, Walter Cannon, coined the term "voodoo death" to describe a response of "primitive people" dying of fear. Based on Cannon's concept, Barker argued that hearing a premonition of one's death may result in a deep fear which could affect the body's immune system and result in death. After the disaster, he heard of a boy who escaped in Aberfan but later died of shock.

Barker visited the Aberfan disaster site and noted that a number of people seemed to escape death by coincidence, such as missing their bus or sleeping in late. Bereaved families spoke of dreams and portents. On the eve of the disaster, a young boy named Paul Davies had reportedly drawn figures digging in the hillside under the words “The End”. Davies died in the school. A young girl named Eryl Mai Jones reportedly told her mother that she was not afraid to die, two weeks before the collapse. A different account of the girl was later published by Barker. In this version, which had been signed by her parents and attested by a local minister, Jones told her mother about a dream where she went to school, but the school "wasn't there" because "something black had come down all over it". According to the report, the next day the girl was among the dead in Aberfan. While touring Aberfan and hearing various stories of foreboding, Barker wanted to investigate whether the claims could be evidence of precognition and he contacted science journalist for London's Evening Standard, Peter Fairley. They invited the newspaper's readers to contact Barker with their 'dreams and forebodings'. While Barker and Fairley received a large number of responses, they were aware the reports had little value as evidence of precognition because they were created after the event.

== Formation of the Bureau ==
John Barker wanted to use claims of precognition to predict and hopefully avert future disasters from occurring. Barker and Fairley created a 'Premonitions Bureau' and invited the public to report experiences that they thought might predict future events. Fairley had a time stamp made and the reports were carefully catalogued and set up with an 11-point system:

- 5 points for "unusualness"
- 5 points for accuracy
- 1 point for timeliness

In theory, the Premonitions Bureau would be a repository for "mass premonitions" to detect patterns which might suggest a possible date, nature, or place of an upcoming disaster.

During its first year, the bureau collected 469 predictions. In one "hit", Alan Hencher, a switchboard operator, predicted a plane crash involving 123 people. Nine days later, a plane crashed near Nicosia in Cyprus, killing a total of 124 people on impact. Another came from music teacher Kathleen Lorna Middleton, who wrote about a vision of a petrified astronaut. Earlier that day, Vladimir Komarov was killed when the Soyuz 1 capsule had crash-landed in Russia, but the incident wasn't reported until later. Middleton also sent a warning about American Senator Robert Kennedy on 11 March 1968, and reportedly called the Premonitions Bureau three times on 4 June. Kennedy was assassinated, having been shot on 5 June 1968, and died the following day.

Meanwhile, Barker's psychiatric work overwhelmed him as the conditions at Shelton became intolerable. His trip to the United States to promote his book was miserable and both Hencher and Middleton predicted that he would soon die. In 1967, Hencher contacted Barker about his prediction, and Middleton warned him of a dream "that may mean death". Barker, who in his late thirties, suffered "emotional stress almost to the point of 'crack up'" and left his previous job as the superintendent of a mental hospital in Dorset, was depressed and believed his end was near. He died in August 1968, 18 months after starting the bureau, of a brain embolism, not by a “gas supply” or “a dark car” as one psychic had suggested. On the morning before, Middleton reported that she woke up with a choking sensation and called out for help.

Shortly after Barker's death, the Premonitions Bureau closed. In the 18 months of the bureau's existence, 723 predictions were collected and 18 recorded as hits, with 12 of those coming from only two correspondents, Hencher and Middleton. No disasters were prevented.

== Critical review ==
The premise of the Premonitions Bureau has been evaluated by sceptics and psychologists. Joe Nickell has pointed out several issues with premonitions including:

- Premonitions reported after events cannot be considered evidence since they may be mental confabulations constructed after the fact.
- Prediction accounts can be misleading in details
- Some premonition stories may be altered over time.
- A prediction made in advance may be interpreted and reconstructed after an event to better fit the details of the event. In addition, the person doing the retrofitting may be seeking credit for details of the premonition that were not specified.
- The problem of determining probability. There is no way to evaluate how dreams run counter to statistical laws.

Michael Shermer explains that precognitive dreams are formed by how the human brain is designed to see patterns and not randomness. Given the number of people dreaming each night, odds are high that someone will have a dream about somebody dying who actually dies soon after. But the many dreams where somebody dying didn't come true are quickly forgotten. The dreamer remembers the "hit" not the misses. In his book Paranormality: Why we see what isn't there, Richard Wiseman discusses how, based on the work by Eugene Aserinsky, sleep scientists found that people have an average of four dreams a night and forget the vast majority of their dreams when waking. People usually remember dreams only if they wake during the dreaming episode. Even then, they remember mostly fragments and soon forget them unless they are remarkable. Because people have many dreams based on the various events from their waking lives, occasionally a dream may seem relevant to a particular event, when it is actually due to the laws of probability. Sleep scientists further discovered that around 80% of dreams are about negative events and therefore bad news will more likely trigger a memory of a corresponding dream, which may explain why many reported premonitions seem to be about death and disasters.

== References in media ==
In 2019, film and studio rights to the story of the British Premonitions Bureau, based on Sam Knight's book, The Premonitions Bureau: A True Account of Death Foretold, was sold to Amazon Studios in a 19-way bidding war.
