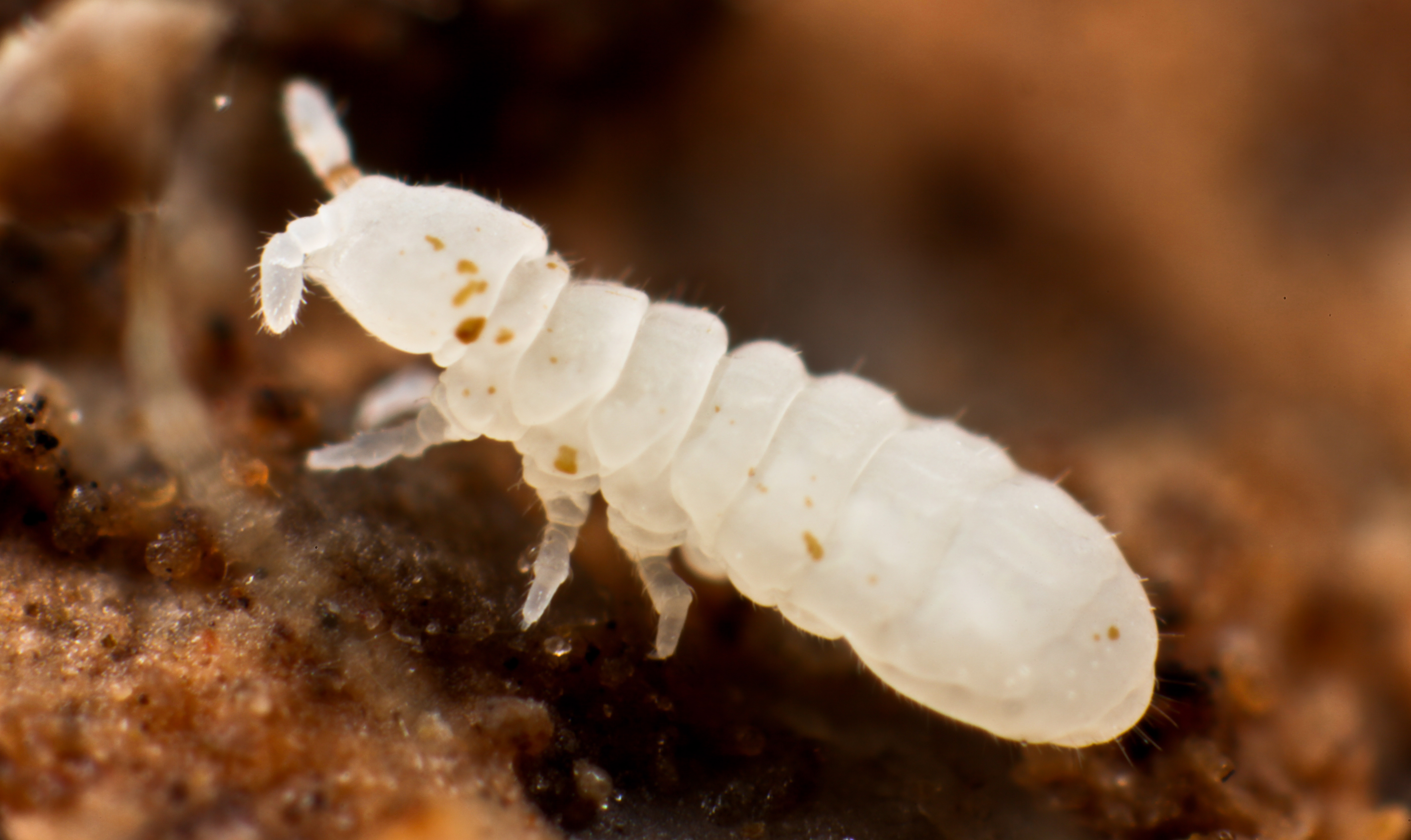

Scientific classification
- Domain: Eukaryota
- Kingdom: Animalia
- Phylum: Arthropoda
- Class: Collembola
- Order: Poduromorpha
- Family: Onychiuridae
- Subfamily: Onychiurinae
- Tribe: Onychiurini
- Genus: Deuteraphorura; Absolon, 1901

Diversity
- 83 species

= Deuteraphorura =

Genus of springtails

Deuteraphorura is a genus of springtails belonging to the family Onychiuridae. There are 83 species in the genus.

== Selected species ==
- Deuteraphorura acicindelia
- Deuteraphorura apuanica
- Deuteraphorura banii
- Deuteraphorura bergamaria
- Deuteraphorura bizkaiensis
- Deuteraphorura boneti
- Deuteraphorura bosnaria
- Deuteraphorura caprelleana
- Deuteraphorura cebennaria
- Deuteraphorura defensaria
- Deuteraphorura dianae
- Deuteraphorura difficilis
- Deuteraphorura doftana
- Deuteraphorura dunaria
- Deuteraphorura eduardi
- Deuteraphorura frasassii
- Deuteraphorura gangjinensis
- Deuteraphorura ghidinii
- Deuteraphorura gridellii
- Deuteraphorura handschini
- Deuteraphorura hategana
- Deuteraphorura hussoni
- Deuteraphorura imperfecta
- Deuteraphorura inermis
- Deuteraphorura insubraria
- Deuteraphorura koreana
- Deuteraphorura kratochvili
- Deuteraphorura kruberaensis
- Deuteraphorura lusa
- Deuteraphorura meziadica
- Deuteraphorura nervosa
- Deuteraphorura oregonensis
- Deuteraphorura ossaria
- Deuteraphorura pieroluccii - Italy
- Deuteraphorura pseudobosnaria
- Deuteraphorura pseudofimetaria
- Deuteraphorura pseudoghidinii
- Deuteraphorura pseudoinsubraria
- Deuteraphorura rendsinae
- Deuteraphorura romanica
- Deuteraphorura schoenviszkyi
- Deuteraphorura scotaria
- Deuteraphorura silesiaca
- Deuteraphorura spipolae
- Deuteraphorura silvaria
- Deuteraphorura variabilis
- Deuteraphorura vinuensis
