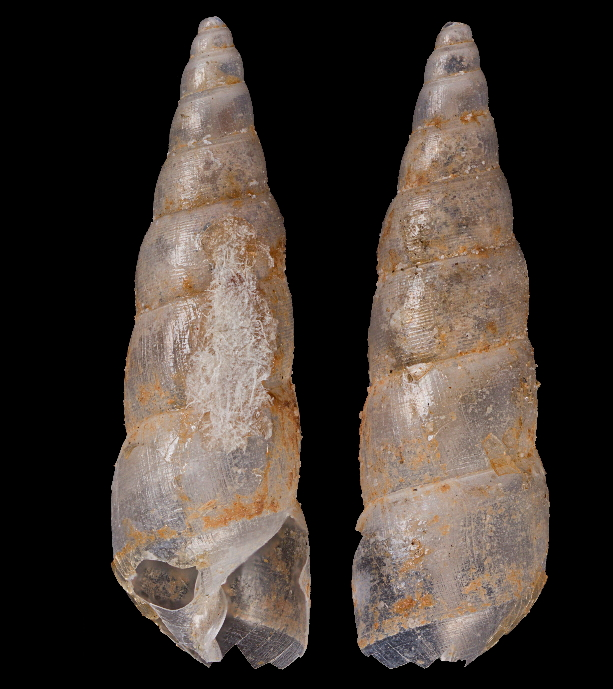
- Shell of Digoniaxis bourguignati (holotype at MNHN, Paris)

Scientific classification
- Domain: Eukaryota
- Kingdom: Animalia
- Phylum: Mollusca
- Class: Gastropoda
- Family: Pyramidellidae
- Genus: Digoniaxis (Jousseaume, 1889)

= Digoniaxis =

Genus of gastropods

Digoniaxis is a genus of air-breathing land snails, terrestrial pulmonate gastropod mollusks in the family Ferussaciidae.

Digoniaxis was first described by French zoologist and malacologist, Félix Pierre Jousseaume, in 1889.

== Species ==
Species within the genus Digoniaxis include:

- Digoniaxis bourguignati (Jousseaume, 1889)

Synonyms

- Digoniaxis cingalensis (W. H. Benson, 1863): synonym of Spiraxis cingalensis W. H. Benson, 1863
