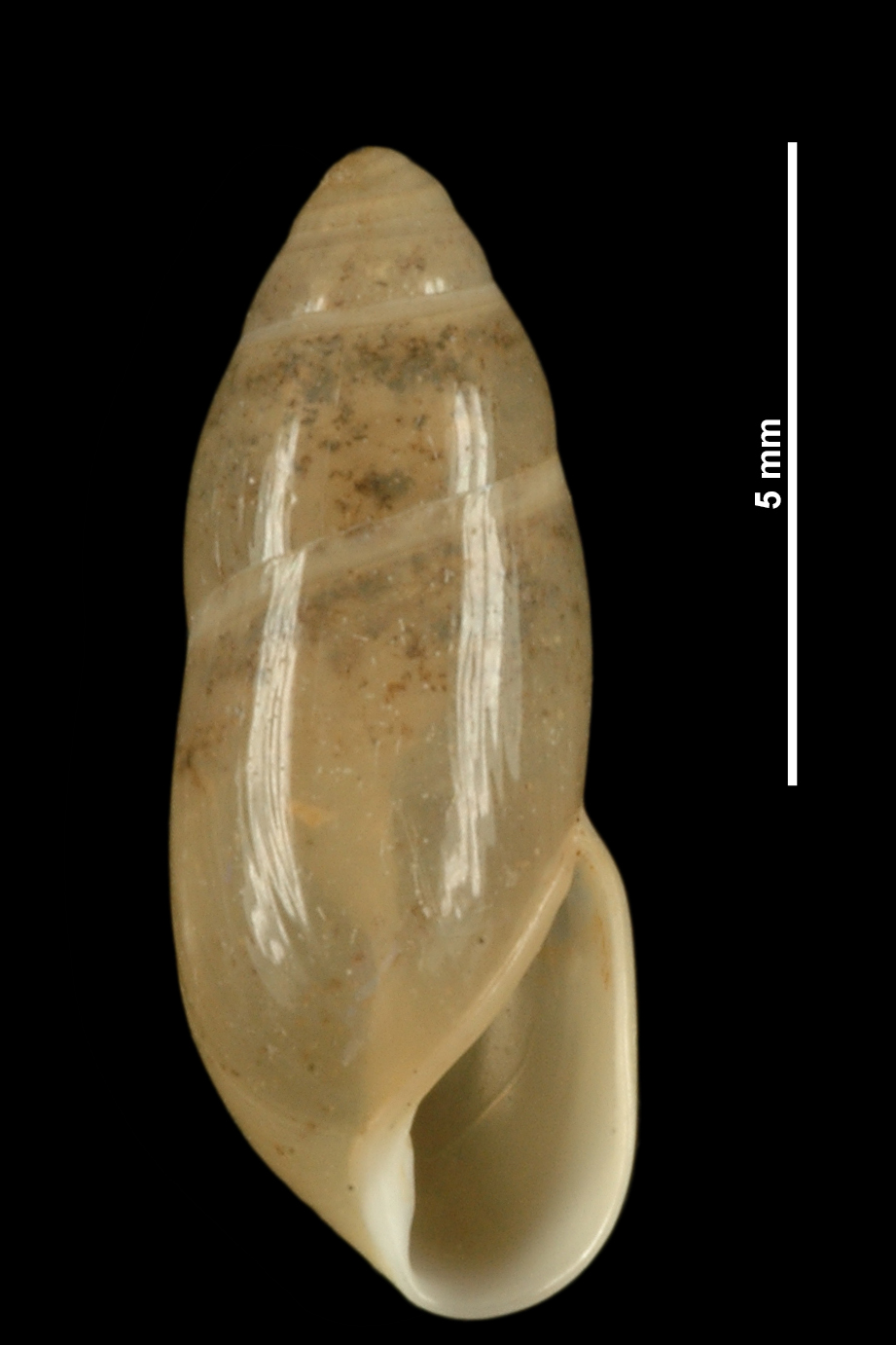
- Shell of Ferussacia folliculum (specimen at MNHN, Paris)

Scientific classification
- Kingdom: Animalia
- Phylum: Mollusca
- Class: Gastropoda
- Order: Stylommatophora
- Suborder: Achatinina
- Superfamily: Achatinoidea
- Family: Ferussaciidae
- Genus: Ferussacia; R. T. Lowe, 1852

Synonyms
- Bullinopersilia F. Nordsieck, 1972; Euferussacia Bourguignat, 1864; Ferrussacia Risso, 1826 (incorrect original spelling); Ferussacia (Ferussacia) Risso, 1826· accepted, alternate representation; Ferussacia (Pegea) Risso, 1826; Ferussacia (Pseudazeca) L. Pfeiffer, 1876; Pegea Risso, 1826 (invalid: junior homonym of Pegea Savigny, 1816 [Tunicata]); Pseudostreptostyla G. Nevill, 1881; Vediantius Risso, 1826

= Ferussacia =

Genus of gastropods

Ferussacia is a genus of air-breathing land snails, terrestrial pulmonate gastropod mollusks in the family Ferussaciidae.

== Species ==
Species within the genus Ferussacia include:

- Ferussacia attenuata (Mousson, 1872)
- Ferussacia carnea (Risso, 1826)
- † Ferussacia convoluta Paladilhe, 1873
- Ferussacia folliculum (Schröter, 1784)
- Ferussacia fritschi (Mousson, 1872)
- Ferussacia hierosolymarum
- Ferussacia lanzarotensis (Mousson, 1872)
- Ferussacia mabilliana
- † Ferussacia martinae Groh & Henkel, 2019
- Ferussacia submajor (Wollaston, 1878)
- † Ferussacia tassaroliana Sacco, 1889
- Ferussacia tumidula (Wollaston, 1878)
- Ferussacia valida (Mousson, 1872)
- Ferussacia vitrea (Webb & Berthelot, 1833)
