= Calaxis =

Scientific classification
- Kingdom: Animalia
- Phylum: Mollusca
- Class: Gastropoda
- Order: Stylommatophora
- Family: Ferussaciidae
- Genus: Calaxis; Bourguignat, 1887

Genus of land snails

Calaxis is a genus of gastropods belonging to the family Ferussaciidae.

The species of this genus are found in eastern Mediterranean.

Species:

- Calaxis cypria (Kobelt, 1896)
- Calaxis hierosolymarum (J.R.Roth, 1855)
