= Karolus (gastropod) =

Scientific classification
- Kingdom: Animalia
- Phylum: Mollusca
- Class: Gastropoda
- Order: Stylommatophora
- Superfamily: Achatinoidea
- Family: Ferussaciidae
- Genus: Karolus; Folin, 1870

Family of Gastropods

Karolus is a genus of gastropods belonging to the family Ferussaciidae.

The species of this genus are found in America.

Species:

- Karolus consobrinus (d'Orbigny, 1841)
- Karolus iota (Adams, 1845)
