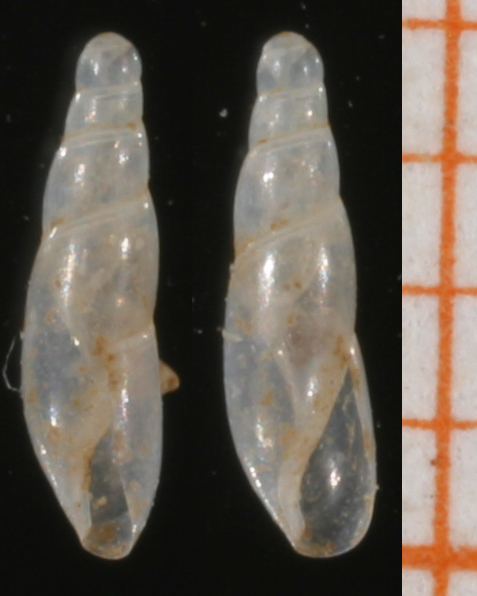
- Two fresh shells of Cecilioides acicula The scale bar is in millimeters

Scientific classification
- Kingdom: Animalia
- Phylum: Mollusca
- Class: Gastropoda
- Order: Stylommatophora
- Suborder: Achatinina
- Superfamily: Achatinoidea
- Family: Ferussaciidae
- Genus: Cecilioides; Férussac, 1814

Type species
- Buccinum acicula O. F. Müller, 1774

Synonyms
- Achatina (Macrospira) Swainson, 1840; Acicula Risso, 1826 (junior synonym; non Acicula W. Hartmann, 1821); Aciculina Westerlund, 1887; Belonis W. Hartmann, 1841; Caecilianella Bourguignat, 1856; Caecilianella (Acicula) Risso, 1826; Caecilioides Herrmannsen, 1846 (unjustified emendation of the original name); Cecilioides (Cecilioides) A. Férussac, 1814· accepted, alternate representation; Cecilioides (Terebrella) Maltzan, 1886 accepted, alternate representation; Cionella (Caecilianella) Bourguignat, 1856; Macrospira Swainson, 1840; Rhaphidiella Maltzan, 1886; Styloides A. Férussac, 1821

= Cecilioides =

Genus of gastropods

Cecilioides is a genus of very small, air-breathing land snails, terrestrial pulmonate gastropod mollusks in the family Ferussaciidae.

Most of the species in this genus live some distance underground. They are usually blind. Because of their subterranean habitat and their small size, they can be difficult to find alive.

When fresh, the shells are transparent. After they have been empty some time in the soil, they usually become an opaque milky-white.

Cecilioides acicula has a very long and slim shell with a dull point at the end. While the animal is alive, the shell is thin, shiny, see-through, and doesn't have any colour. However, after the animal dies, the shell turns white and no longer lets light through. The inside spiral part of the shell stops suddenly when it reaches the edge of the bottom lip (Pilsbry 1948, Kerney and Cameron 1979).

== Species ==
Species within this genus include:

- Cecilioides acicula (Müller, 1774)
- † Cecilioides aciculella (Sandberger, 1872)
- Cecilioides actoniana (Benoit, 1862)
- Cecilioides advena (Ancey, 1888)
- Cecilioides aperta (Guilding in Swainson, 1840)
- Cecilioides balanus (Reeve, 1850)
- Cecilioides barbozae (Maltzan, 1886)
- Cecilioides bensoni Gude, 1914
- Cecilioides blandiana (Crosse, 1880)
- Cecilioides caledonica (Crosse, 1867)
- Cecilioides callipeplum (Connolly, 1923)
- Cecilioides clessini (Maltzan, 1886)
- Cecilioides connollyi Tomlin, 1943
- Cecilioides dicaprio Dourson, Caldwell & Dourson, 2018
- Cecilioides eucharista (Bourguignat, 1864)
- Cecilioides eulima (Lowe, 1854)
- Cecilioides gokweanus (O. Boettger, 1870)
- † Cecilioides grateloupi (Bourguignat, 1856)
- Cecilioides gundlachi (Pfeiffer, 1850)
- Cecilioides iota (C. B. Adams, 1845)
- Cecilioides isseli (Paladilhe, 1872)
- Cecilioides janii (Strobel, 1855)
- Cecilioides jeskalovicensis A. J. Wagner, 1914
- Cecilioides jod Pilsbry, 1907
- Cecilioides kalawangaensis Dartevelle & Venmans, 1951
- Cecilioides manensis de Winter, 1990
- Cecilioides mauritiana (H. Adams, 1868)
- † Cecilioides munieri (Paladilhe, 1875)
- Cecilioides nyctelia (Bourguignat, 1856)
- Cecilioides pergracilis Connolly, 1939
- Cecilioides petitiana (Benoit, 1862)
- Cecilioides raddei (O. Boettger, 1879)
- Cecilioides raphidia (Bourguignat, 1856)
- † Cecilioides senutae Pickford, 2009
- †Cecilioides sommeri (Ferreira & Coelho, 1971)
- Cecilioides spencei Dupuis, 1923
- Cecilioides stephaniana (Benoit, 1862)
- Cecilioides tribulationis (Preston, 1911)
- Cecilioides tumulorum (Bourguignat, 1856)
- Cecilioides veneta (Strobel, 1855)
- Cecilioides virgo (Preston, 1911)

Species brought into synonymy

- Cecilioides consobrina (d’Orbigny, 1842): synonym of Karolus consobrinus (d'Orbigny, 1841)
- † Cecilioides pseudocylichna (De Stefani, 1880): synonym of † Acicula pseudocylichna De Stefani, 1880
