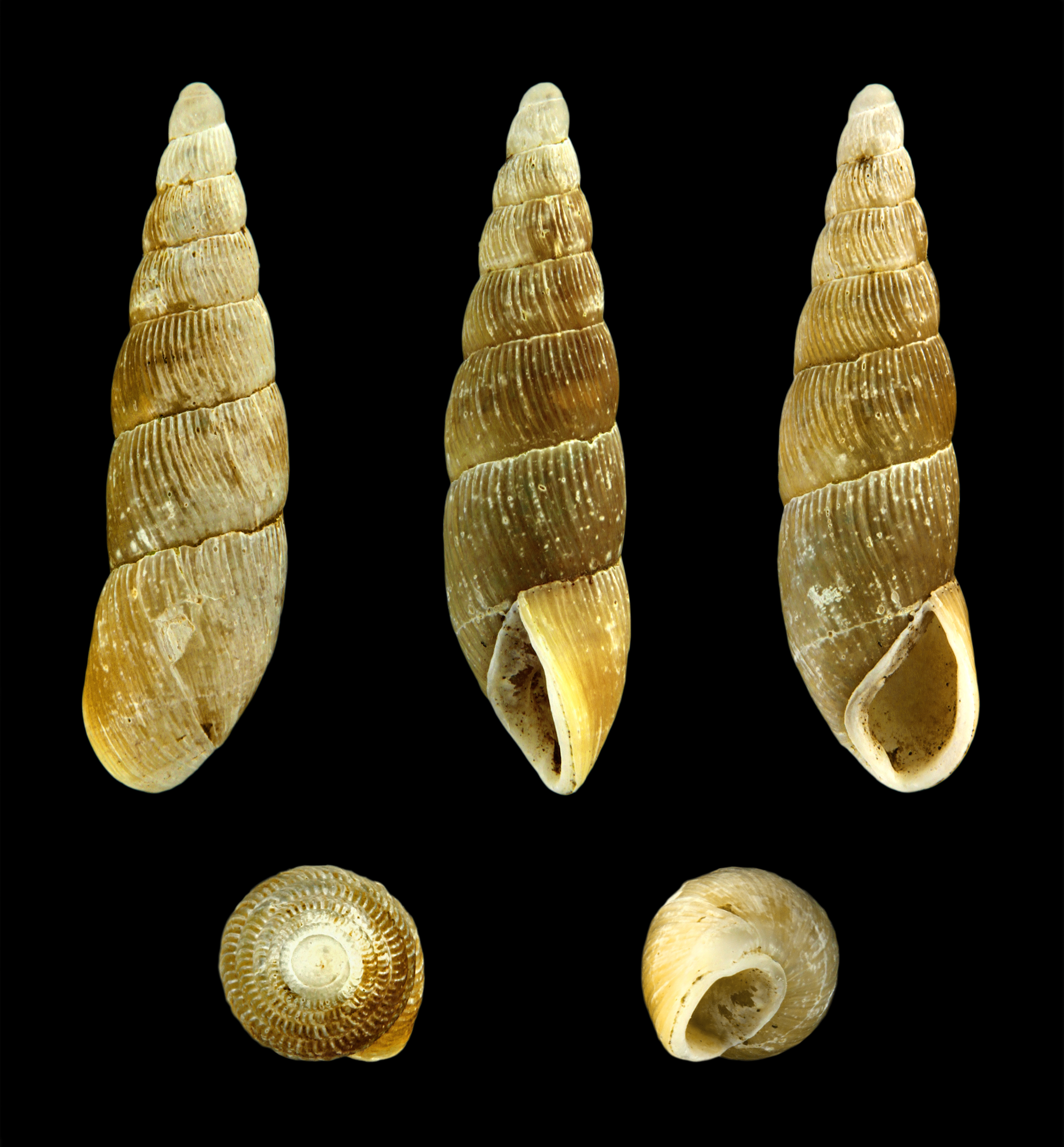

Scientific classification
- Kingdom: Animalia
- Phylum: Mollusca
- Class: Gastropoda
- Order: Stylommatophora
- Family: Ferussaciidae
- Genus: Sculptiferussacia; Germain, 1911

= Sculptiferussacia =

Genus of gastropods

Sculptiferussacia is a genus of small air-breathing land snails, terrestrial pulmonate gastropod mollusks in the family Ferussaciidae.

== Species ==
The genus Sculptiferrussacia includes the following species:

- Sculptiferussacia clausiliaeformis Alonso & Ibáñez, 1992
