= Coilostele =

Scientific classification
- Kingdom: Animalia
- Phylum: Mollusca
- Class: Gastropoda
- Order: Stylommatophora
- Family: Ferussaciidae
- Genus: Coilostele; Benson, 1864

Genus of gastropods

Coilostele is a genus of gastropods belonging to the family Ferussaciidae.

The species of this genus are found in Western Mediterranean, India.

Species:

- Coilostele acus (Pfeiffer, 1854)
- Coilostele akus Servain, 1880
- Coilostele cylindrata Boettger, 1905
- Coilostele inquirenda Rensch, 1935
- Coilostele paladilhiana Nevill, 1878
- Coilostele scalaris Benson, 1864
- Coilostele tampicoensis (Pilsbry, 1907)
