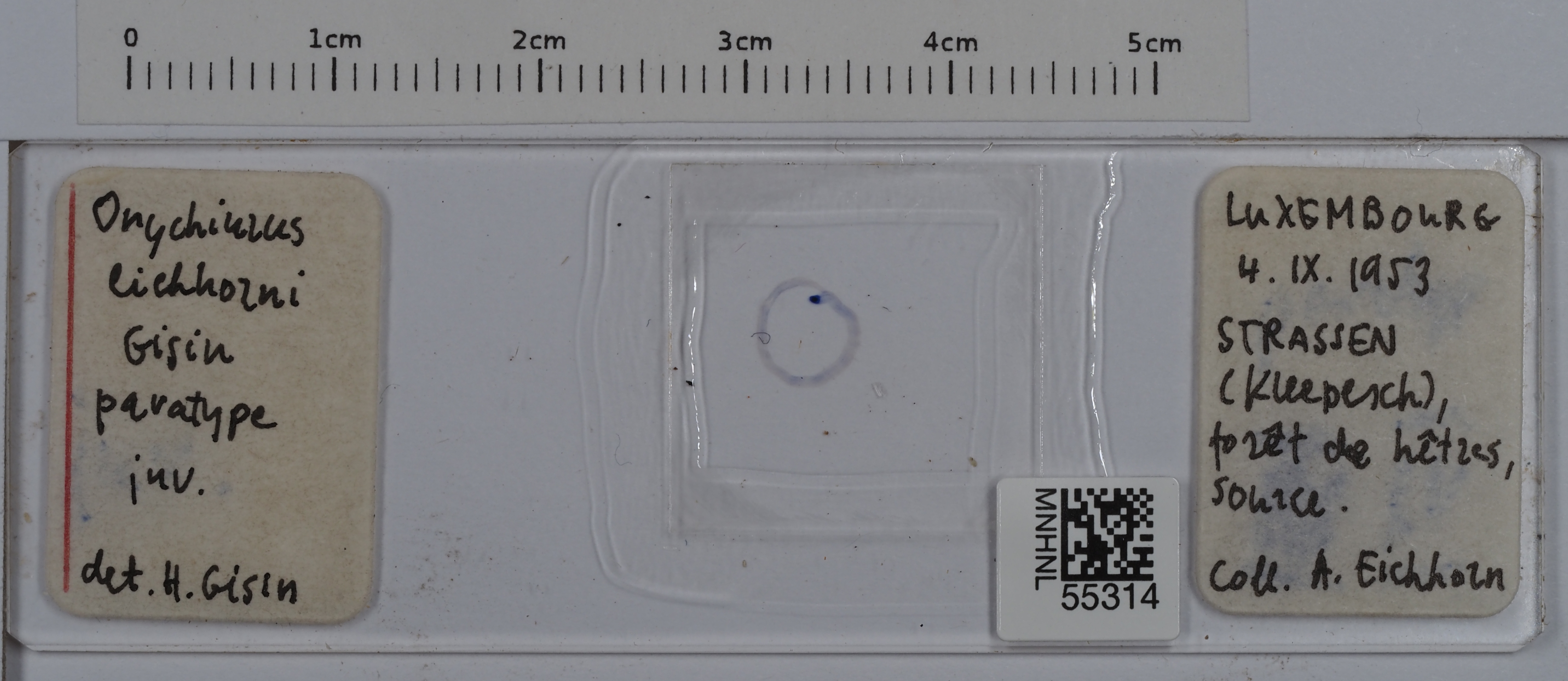
- Protaphorura eichhorni

Scientific classification
- Domain: Eukaryota
- Kingdom: Animalia
- Phylum: Arthropoda
- Class: Collembola
- Order: Poduromorpha
- Family: Onychiuridae
- Genus: Protaphorura; Absolon, 1901

= Protaphorura =

Genus of arthropods

Protaphorura is a genus of arthropods belonging to the family Onychiuridae.

The species of this genus are found in Europe, Russia and Northern America.

Species:

- Protaphorura abscondita Absolon, 1901
- Protaphorura aconae Arbea & Jordana, 1994
