= Cylichnidia =

Scientific classification
- Kingdom: Animalia
- Phylum: Mollusca
- Class: Gastropoda
- Order: Stylommatophora
- Family: Ferussaciidae
- Genus: Cylichnidia; R. T. Lowe, 1852

Genus of gastropods

Cylichnidia is a genus of air-breathing land snails, terrestrial pulmonate gastropod mollusks in the family Ferussaciidae.

== Species ==
Species within the genus Cylichnidia include:

- Cylichnidia ovuliformis
