= Mercury Ghilarov =

Soviet soil scientist (1912–1985)

Academician Mercury Sergeyevich Ghilarov
- Гиляров, Меркурий Сергеевич
- Born: March 6, 1912; Kiev
- Died: March 2, 1985 (aged 72); Moscow
- Resting place: Novodevichy Cemetery
- Citizenship: Soviet Union
- Education: Kiev State University
- Children: Alexey Ghilarov
- Father: Sergey Ghilarov
- Scientific career
- Fields: Soil biology
- Institutions: Severtsov Institute of Ecology and Evolution
- Notable students: N. M. Chernovna

Mercury Sergeyevich Ghilarov (also written as Gilyarov, Giliarov; Russian: Меркурий Сергеевич Гиляров; 6 March 1912 – 2 March 1985) was a Soviet soil scientist who was a pioneer of soil biology, the life in the soil including insects and other small invertebrates. Ghilarov laid emphasis on the soil as a peculiar medium that consisted of a mix of liquid, solid, and gas phases and therefore suggested that it was the zone of evolutionary transition between aquatic and terrestrial life forms.

== Biography ==
Mercury Ghilarov was born in Kiev and studied entomology at the State University of Kiev from 1929 to 1933 after which he worked for the Ukrainian Plant Protection Station.

He later moved to Moscow to work on rubber-bearing plants and then began to study soil insects. He obtained a Ph.D. in 1938 and in 1944 he moved to the Institute of Evolutionary Morphology where he proposed the idea of soil as a transitional environment between aquatic and terrestrial life. He wrote an influential monograph on “The specificity of soil as insect habitat and its role in insect evolution” (1949) and in 1956 he founded the first laboratory for soil zoology. He began to examine soil faunal compositions and established their use in a system to classify soils in the USSR. Ghilarov may have been the first researcher to systematically observe a relationship between organism biomass and abundance, and though this work in soils made little impact, a similar phenomenon in oceans would become widely known.

== Awards ==
Ghilarov received the USSR State Prizes in 1951, 67 and 80 apart from the Mechnikov Gold Medal from the Academy of Sciences of the Soviet Union (1978). He was also a recipient of the Filippo Silvestri Gold Medal (1965), the Gustav Kraatz Medal (1966) and other honours.

== Publications ==
Main books:

- Ghilarov, M. S. (1949) Features of Soil as a Habitat and Its Significance in the Evolution of Insects [Особенности почвы как среды обитания и ее значение в эволюции насекомых]. Moscow and Leningrad: Academy of Sciences of the USSR. 280 pp . [in Russian]
- Ghilarov, M. S. (1965) Zoological Method of Soil Diagnostics [Зоологический метод диагностики почв]. Moscow: Nauka. 278 pp. [in Russian]
- Ghilarov, M. S. (1970) Patterns of Arthropod Adaptations to Terrestrial Life [Закономерности приспособлений членистоногих к жизни на суше]. Moscow: Nauka. 276 pp. [in Russian]
