= Absolonia =

Scientific classification
- Domain: Eukaryota
- Kingdom: Animalia
- Phylum: Arthropoda
- Class: Collembola
- Order: Poduromorpha
- Family: Onychiuridae
- Genus: Absolonia; Börner, 1901

Genus of springtails

Absolonia is a genus of springtails belonging to the family Onychiuridae.

Species:

- Absolonia gigantea (Absolon, 1901)
