= E. Dolby Shelton =

English printer, publisher, and social reformer (1856–1944)

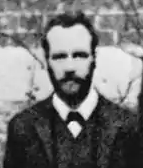
- Shelton in 1891
- Born: Edward Dolby Shelton; 5 January 1856; Peterborough, England
- Died: 1 April 1944 (aged 88); Rayleigh, Essex, England
- Occupations: Printer; publisher; social reformer
- Known for: Advocacy for temperance and vegetarianism
- Spouse: Frances Elizabeth Stroulger (m. 1885)
- Children: 1

Signature
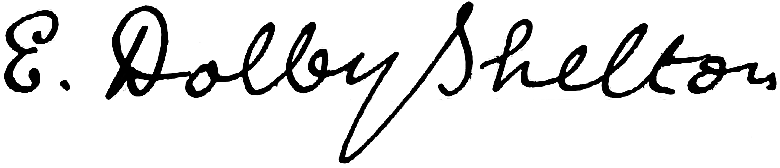

Edward Dolby Shelton (5 January 1856 – 1 April 1944) was an English printer, publisher, and social reformer. He was active in the temperance and vegetarianism movements. Shelton worked in Alexander Thomson's printing business in Manchester, co-managed the Isle of Wight Express, and later ran a printing and publishing business in Ely, Cambridgeshire. While living on the Isle of Wight, he managed the Ventnor Vegetarian Hotel, where Mahatma Gandhi stayed. He later continued his business and church activities in Ely while remaining associated with vegetarian work.

== Biography ==
=== Early life ===
Edward Dolby Shelton was born in Peterborough on 5 January 1856. He attended the British School there until the age of 11.

=== Vegetarianism and temperance ===
Shelton became a vegetarian after hearing a lecture by J. M. Skinner, a fellow Good Templar and temperance advocate, while living in Leicester. His involvement in vegetarianism increased after he moved to Northampton and joined the Vegetarian Society.

=== Career ===
==== Manchester and London ====
In 1880, Shelton moved to Manchester and worked for Alexander Thomson's printing business. In Manchester, he met vegetarians associated with the movement and lived with Joseph Alley, a strict vegetarian. Shelton became active in the Vegetarian Society and later joined its executive committee, encouraged by R. Bailey Walker.

In the second quarter of 1885, he married Frances Elizabeth Stroulger; they had one son, Percival. Shelton moved to London in May 1885. According to James Gregory, vegetarianism initially divided the household, but his wife later adopted the diet.

==== Ventnor and the Isle of Wight ====
In 1888, the family moved to Ventnor on the Isle of Wight for health reasons. Shelton co-managed the Isle of Wight Express, a publication which refused alcohol advertising and gave space to social issues. He also entered a printing and publishing partnership with William Briddon, which ended in 1888. The venture was not financially successful, and Shelton relied on income from managing the Ventnor Vegetarian Hotel, which attracted vegetarians visiting from Manchester and London. Mahatma Gandhi later stayed there.

==== Ely and Cambridgeshire ====
Shelton later moved to Ely, Cambridgeshire. He gave more attention to business and church affairs and became less involved in organised vegetarian propaganda, while remaining connected to the Cambridge Vegetarian Society. Gregory notes that local perceptions of the society sometimes characterised its members as "freaks and fanatics".

From 1893 to 1905, Shelton was in partnership with John P. Tibbitts as Shelton and Tibbitts, publishing and printing local works. Publications included Gems of Ely Cathedral (1900) and the Ely Red Book (1894). Shelton also produced local postcards, including views of the Soldiers' Memorial in Ely Cathedral.

=== Later life and death ===
Around the age of 50, Shelton became a seer for the Trustees of the Countess of Huntingdon's Connexion, holding the position into the 1930s. Shelton and his wife continued to promote vegetarianism; she wrote a regular column for The Vegetarian, and Shelton attended cookery lessons as part of his advocacy.

Shelton died in Rayleigh, Essex, on 1 April 1944, aged 88. Shelton was profiled in The Vegetarian Messenger in 1935, and his obituary appeared in the Vegetarian News.
