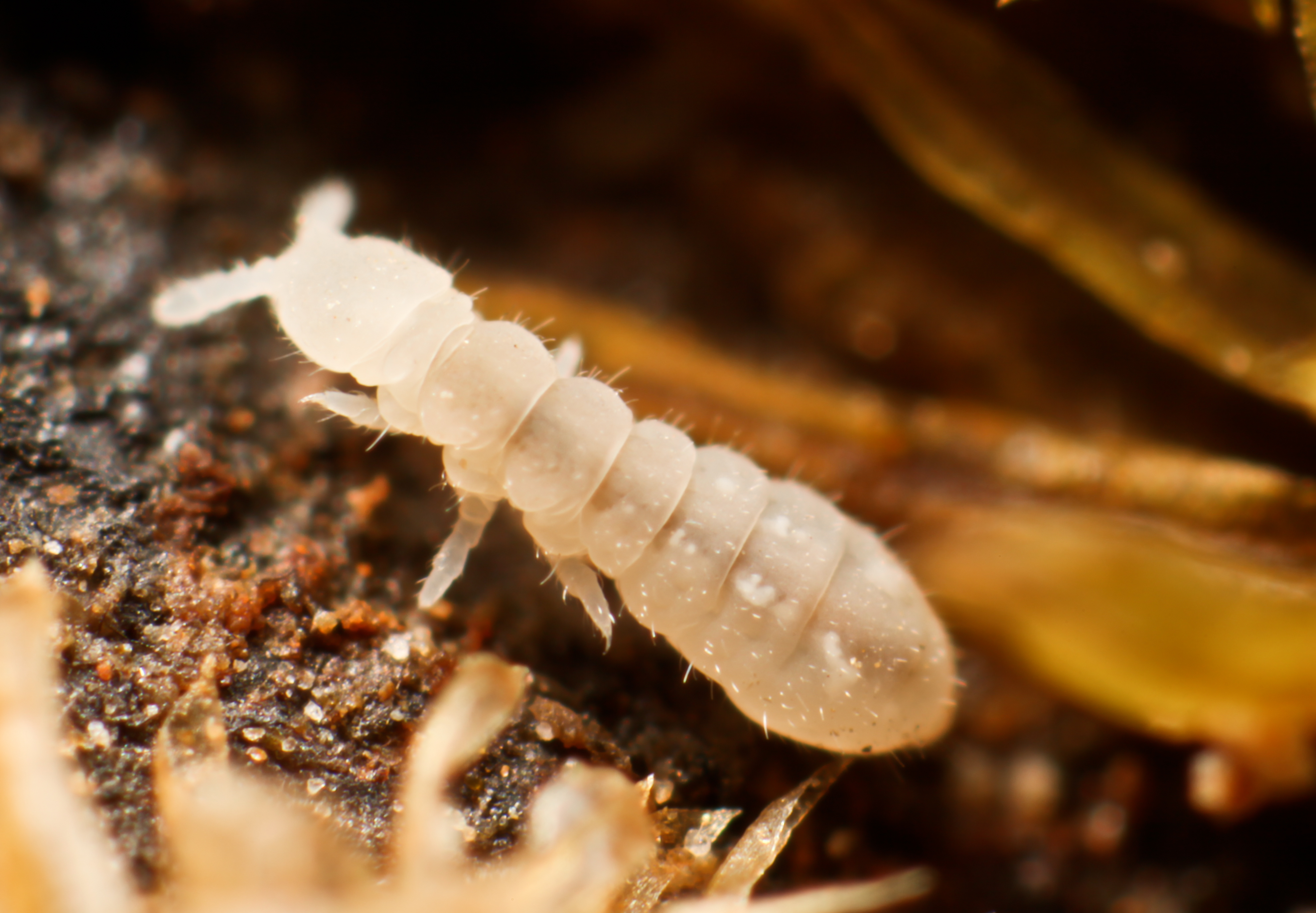

Scientific classification
- Domain: Eukaryota
- Kingdom: Animalia
- Phylum: Arthropoda
- Class: Collembola
- Order: Poduromorpha
- Family: Onychiuridae
- Genus: Onychiurus; Gervais, 1841

= Onychiurus =

Genus of arthropods

Onychiurus is a genus of arthropods belonging to the family Onychiuridae.

The genus has cosmopolitan distribution.

Species:

- Onychiurus aborigensis Fjellberg, 1987
- Onychiurus absoloni (Boener, 1901)
