= Sandra Shelton =

American economist

Sandra Waller Shelton (1954–2021) was an American economist, specializing in auditing and accounting. She was a professor in the School of Accountancy & MIS at DePaul University, where she was named KPMG Alumni Distinguished Professor in 2012 and KPMG Neil F. Casson Endowed Professor in 2016.

== Education and career ==
Shelton attended Hamilton High School and was a 1976 graduate of Rhodes College, where she majored in economics. After receiving a Master of Business Administration from Indiana University School of Business in Bloomington in 1978, she began working for one of what at that time were the big six accounting firms, but returned to academia after guest-lecturing at Chicago State University. She completed a Ph.D. in accounting from the University of Wisconsin–Madison in 1994, and joined the De Paul faculty.

== Recognition ==
The PhD Project, a non-profit organization whose goal is to bring minority students back to academia as professors, listed Shelton in their hall of fame in 2014. In 2017 the Rhodes College Black Student Association gave Shelton their Distinguished Alumni Award.
