= Soil zoology =

Study of animals that live in soil

Soil zoology or pedozoology is the study of animals living fully or partially in the soil (soil fauna). The field of study was developed in the 1940s by Mercury Ghilarov in Russia. Ghilarov noted inverse relationships between size and numbers of soil organisms. He also suggested that soil included water, air and solid phases and that soil may have provided the transitional environment between aquatic and terrestrial life. The phrase was apparently first used in the English speaking world at a conference of soil zoologists presenting their research at the University of Nottingham, UK, in 1955.

Because soil zoology encompasses all animals living within the soil, it includes macrofauna like mammals, arthropods, and insects, as well as microfauna like nematodes and tardigrades. The extent of biodiversity within soils far broader than scientists have managed to study so far, with thousands of species capable of coexisting in different sites. Studying the interactions that take place between organisms in the soil can bring new insights farmers can use to reduce chemical usage by focusing instead on integrated pest management (a combination of practices to best control and reduce pest damage).

== See also ==
- Biogeochemical cycle
- Soil ecology
- Zoology

== Bibliography ==
- Safwat H. Shakir Hanna, ed, 2004, Soil Zoology For Sustainable Development In The 21st century: A Festschrift in Honour of Prof. Samir I. Ghabbour on the Occasion of His 70th Birthday, Cairo, ISBN 977-17-1903-3.
- Brown, G. G., & Sautter, K. D. (2009). Biodiversity, conservation and sustainable management of soil animals: The XV international colloquium on soil zoology and XII International Colloquium on Apterygota. Pesquisa Agropecuária Brasileira, 44(8), i–ix. https://doi.org/10.1590/s0100-204x2009000800001
