= Shelton High School =

Shelton High School may refer to:

- Shelton High School (Washington) in Shelton, Washington
- Shelton High School (Connecticut) in Shelton, Connecticut
