= Shelton Hospital =

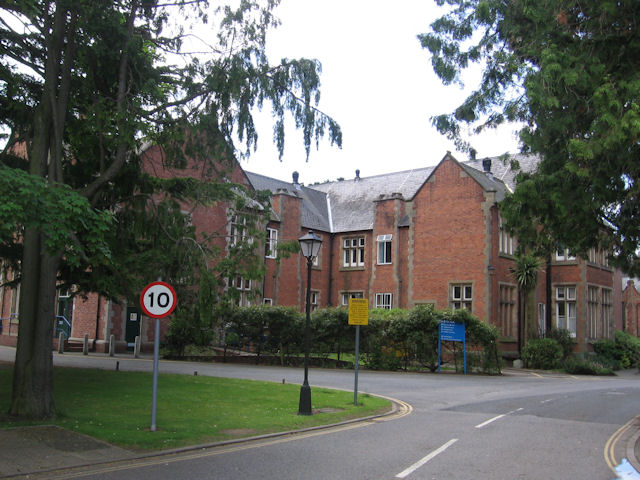
- Entrance to Shelton Hospital

- Shown in Shropshire

Geography
- Location: Shelton, Shropshire, England
- Coordinates: 52.7120°N 2.8015°W

Organisation
- Care system: NHS
- Type: Specialist

Services
- Speciality: Mental health

History
- Founded: 1845
- Closed: 2012

Links
- Lists: Hospitals in England

Shelton Hospital was a mental health facility in Shelton, Shropshire, England. The main building survives and it is a Grade II listed building.

== History ==
The hospital, which was designed by George Gilbert Scott and William Bonython Moffatt using a corridor layout, opened as the Shropshire and Wenlock Borough Lunatic Asylum in March 1845. It was built on 15 acres of land belonging to St Julian's church, Shrewsbury, and purchased at a cost of £2,029.18. 7d. Built in Tudor style of brick with stone dressings, the 60 patients were segregated, male and female. This also included the staff (nursing attendants) entering from separate entrances and appears to conform to the 19th concept of the ideal asylum. A major extension, involving five extra wards, was completed in 1884. It became Salop Mental Hospital in 1921 and saw service as the Copthorne and Shelton Emergency Hospital during the Second World War.

Shortly after reaching its peak population of 1,027 patients in 1947, the facility joined the National Health Service as Shelton Hospital in September 1948.

John Barker was a psychiatrist at the hospital who ran a number of research projects including privately setting up the Premonitions Bureau. On 26 February 1968, tragedy struck the hospital when a fire ripped through a female ward, killing 21 patients. Hospital Fire Regulations throughout the country were outdated, in Shelton's case, they followed those of 1917. Following the fire on Beech Ward, all hospital fire regulations were evaluated and updated.

After the introduction of Care in the Community in the early 1980s, the hospital went into a period of decline and closed in September 2012. The main buildings were subsequently converted into apartments as Leighton Park. Meanwhile, a modern mental health facility known as the Redwoods Centre has been established a little south of the old hospital.
