= Sheldon spectrum =

Phenomenon of marine life

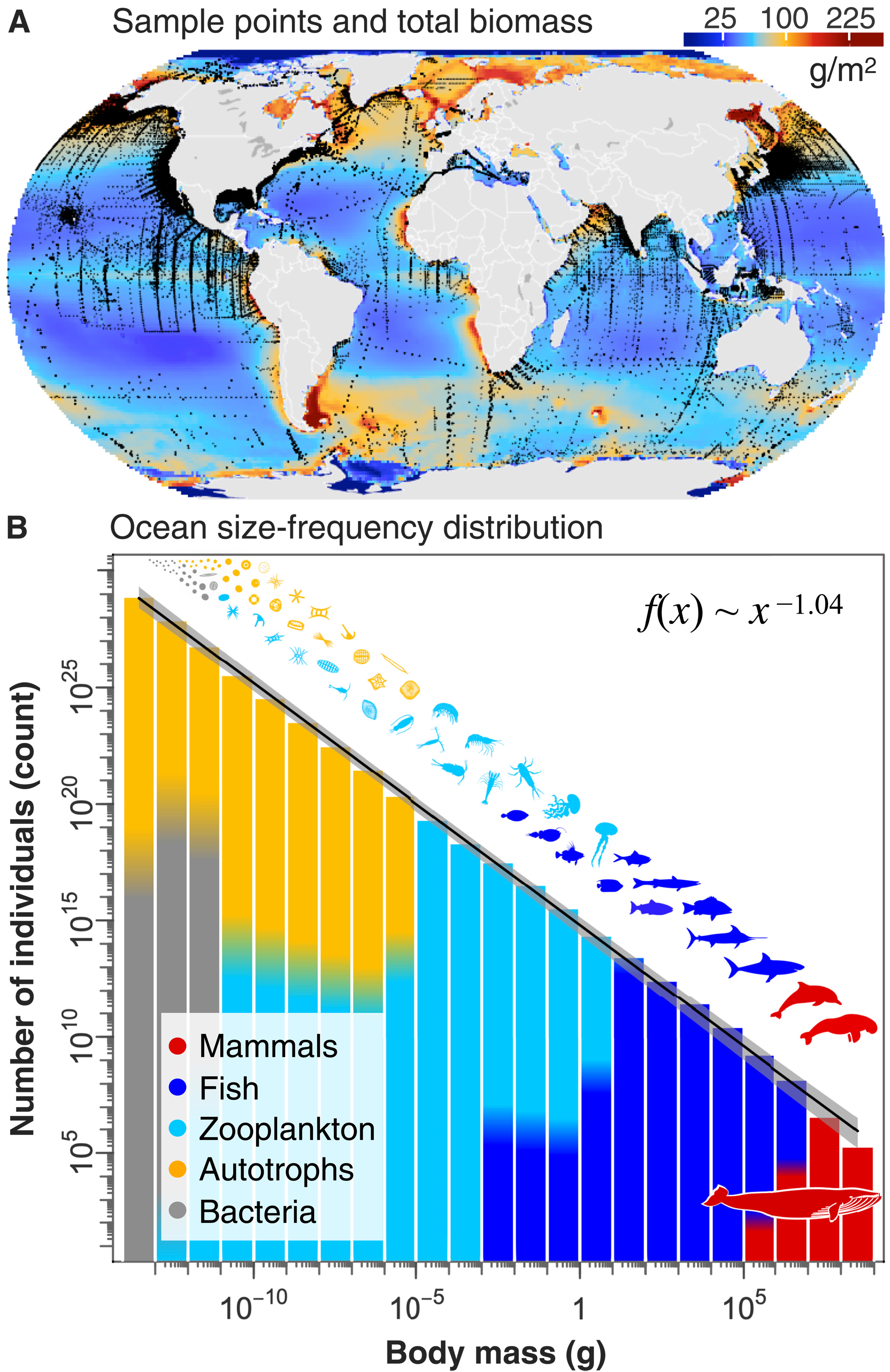
(A) The black mapped points are n = 226,405 sample locations for measurements of heterotrophic bacteria and zooplankton. Autotrophs were estimated from satellite imagery of surface chlorophyll and fish from global process models constrained by catch data. Marine mammals are estimated from species global population estimates, and their biomass is not included on the map. Biomass (g/m2; wet weight) of each group is summed over all groups in each 1° region of the ocean (only biomass in the upper 200 m is shown here). (B) Total ocean biomass (wet weight) is partitioned across relevant size classes (g, wet weight) for each group to estimate the global size spectrum. This is shown as the total number of individuals in each order of magnitude size class over the ocean’s epipelagic and continental shelves (upper ~200 m), giving an exponent of −1.04 (95% CI: −1.05 to −1.02). The gray confidence band includes biomass uncertainty in each size class and uncertainty in the size distribution of each group. Bin colors show the relative fraction of each group on a linear axis [no relation to y axis or to the biomass in (A)].

The Sheldon spectrum is an empirically-observed feature of marine life by which the size of an organism is inversely correlated with its abundance in the ocean. The spectrum is named after Ray Sheldon, a marine ecologist at Canada’s Bedford Institute of Oceanography in Dartmouth, Nova Scotia. Sheldon and colleagues first suggested the existence of the inverse correlation based on seagoing measurements of plankton made with a Coulter counter in the late 1960s, most notably during the first circum-navigation of the Americas aboard the CCGS Hudson.

The inverse correlation implies that biomass density as a function of logarithmic body mass is approximately constant over many orders of magnitude. For example, when Sheldon and his colleagues analyzed a plankton sample in a bucket of seawater, they would tend to find that one third of the plankton mass was between 1 and 10 micrometers, another third was between 10 and 100 micrometers, and a third was between 100 micrometers and 1 millimeter. To make up for the differences of size, there must be a remarkably accurate mathematically correlative decrease in number of organisms as they become larger, in order for the biomass to remain constant. Thus, the rule predicts that krill which are a million times smaller than tuna are a million times more abundant in the ocean, a prediction which appears to be true.

There is strong evidence that human behavior, particularly overfishing and whaling, have modified the Sheldon spectrum for larger species, and it is unknown what long term effects such global alteration may have.
