= Shelton, Shropshire =

Suburb of Shrewsbury, Shropshire, England

Coordinates: 52.7150°N 2.7925°W

Shelton
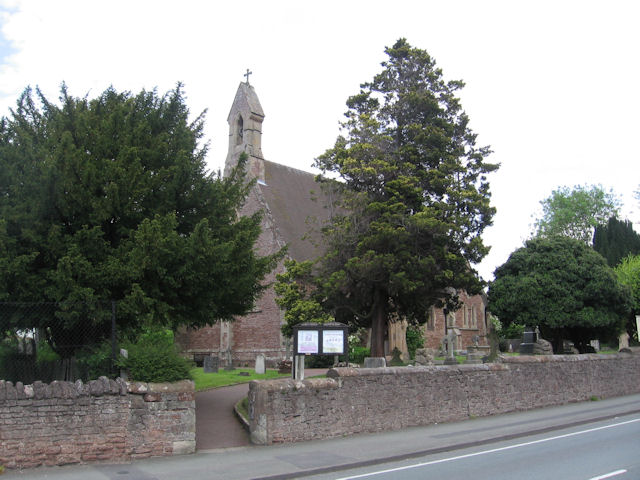
- Oxon and Shelton church

- Location within Shropshire
- OS grid reference: SJ467134
- Unitary authority: Shropshire
- Ceremonial county: Shropshire
- Region: West Midlands
- Country: England
- Sovereign state: United Kingdom
- Post town: Shrewsbury
- Postcode district: SY3
- Dialling code: 01743
- Police: West Mercia
- Fire: Shropshire
- Ambulance: West Midlands
- UK Parliament: Shrewsbury

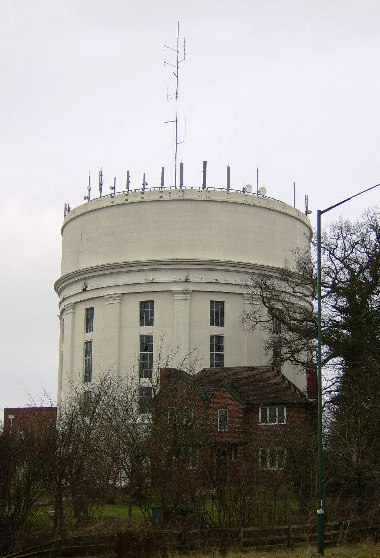
Shelton water tower on the Severn Trent Water site.

Shelton is a suburb located in the west of the town of Shrewsbury in Shropshire, England, described by the Pevsner Architectural Guides as "Shrewsbury's principal interwar suburb."

It was once a village of its own, but the town of Shrewsbury has grown steadily in the area since the 1950s. It has a Church of England parish church, Christ Church (built 1854) which serves a parish formally known as Shelton and Oxon.

== History ==
=== Possible Roman Road ===
The 1861 six-inch OS map shows a footpath just south of the lunatic asylum as "site of Roman road". On later OS maps the marking was dropped from this location.

=== Domesday Book ===
Shelton appears in the Domesday Book as ‘Saltone’, with 4 households.

=== The Shelton Oak ===
The Shelton Oak (see watercolour) was a long lived oak tree which, by tradition, Owain Glyndŵr climbed to view the Battle of Shrewsbury in 1403. An oak tree which died in the 1940s (see photograph), and the remnants of which were removed for road widening in the 1950s, was said to be the Shelton Oak.

In the 1880s an acorn from the Shelton Oak was planted in the Dingle in The Quarry, the main park in Shrewsbury. Shropshire Council planted an acorn from that tree on opening the nearby Mytton Oak Remembrance Park in 2014.

A young oak tree located by the side of the modern junction, where the footpath from the end of Merlin Road emerges onto the main road, has a plaque at its base which reads:

Near this site once stood the Shelton Oak from which according to a tradition recorded in the late 18th century Owen Glyndŵr viewed the Battle of Shrewsbury on 31st July 1403. This tree was planted by the Mayor of Shrewsbury Councillor Mrs Jean Marsh on 27th January 1981 and was presented by Major W Manners MBE.

The Battle of Shrewsbury date is erroneous, it should read "21st July 1403".

=== The Oak, Shelton (inn) ===
An inn called The Oak (see photograph) formerly stood between the Mount and Shelton Road where the two roads meet. It was constructed in 1939 and demolished 60 years later.

There is now a monument at the junction where the two roads meet, with a relief featuring the story of the Shelton Oak.

=== Vicarage ===
A modern day pub called Oxon Priory, belonging to the 'Hungry Horse' chain, occupied the listed former vicarage for Oxon and Shelton parish. The pub has since closed down as of October 2025. The building's roof caught fire on 6 October

=== Prince of Wales visits Rossall, 1806 ===
On 9 September 1806 George, Prince of Wales stayed at Rossall just north of Shelton. The following morning he was attended by the Mayor of Shrewsbury and others who conferred on His Royal Highness the freedom of the borough.

=== Toll House ===
Following the Act of Union in 1801 there was a move to enable Irish MPs to make easier journeys to the House of Commons in London. Thomas Telford was Director of the Holyhead Road Commission between 1815 and 1830 and made many improvements to the Holyhead Road.

A Toll house was built by Telford in 1829 on the Holyhead Road at Shelton. It was situated at the junction with Featherbed Lane. To allow for road widening in the early 1970s, it was dismantled and re-erected at Blists Hill Victorian Town.

=== Bypass ===
In 1933 the (now "old") Shrewsbury bypass was opened with Shelton at its western end. The section from Shelton to Porthill island is called Shelton Road. 1992 saw the opening of today's A5 bypass further out from Shrewsbury.

=== Shelton Hospital ===
Shelton Hospital was a hospital specialising in mental health, located in Shelton. After services transferred to a modern facility known as the Redwoods Centre, it closed in 2012.

== Severn Trent Water Site ==
Severn Trent Water has a major site on Welshpool Road in Shelton, consisting of offices and a water treatment works.

== Cricket ==
Shelton has a cricket club whose ground is adjacent to the former Shelton Hospital (see above), with which the club has strong historic associations.

The team played in the Shropshire Premier Cricket League until the league was wound up after the 2011 season.

In 2012 Shelton played in the Premier Division of the newly formed Shropshire County Cricket League but were relegated to Division One at the end of that season.

In 2015 Shelton finished second in Division One, gaining promotion to the Premier Division and ending a spell of three years outside the top division. However at the end of the 2016 season they finished bottom of the Premier Division and were relegated back to Division One for the 2017 season.

In 2019 Shelton won the Division One title by 43 points promoting them back to the Shropshire Premier Division. They have remained in the division since then finishing 9th in 2021 and 8th in 2022.
