= Shelton Oak =

Tree in England

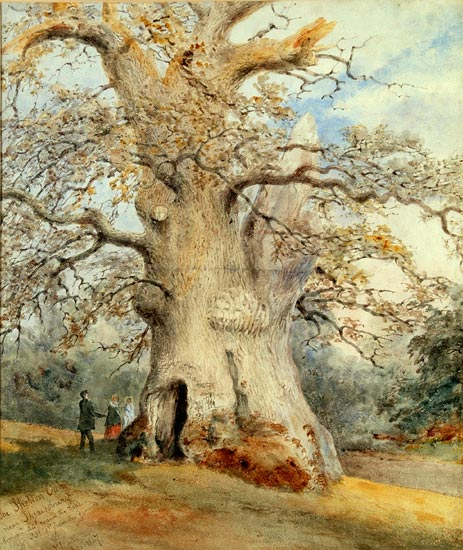
- Early 19th-century painting of the tree by David Parkes
- Location: Near Shrewsbury, England
- Date felled: by 1940

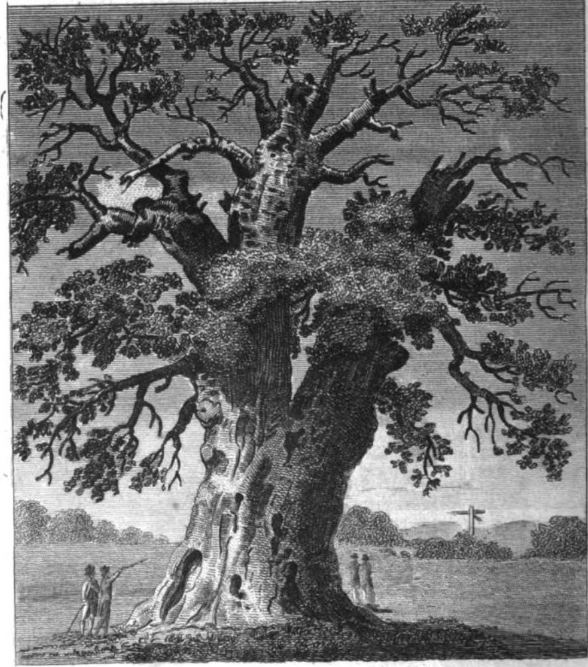
Shelton Oak 1810

The Shelton Oak, also known as Owen Glendwr's Observatory or the Glendower Oak, was a veteran oak tree near Shrewsbury, England. It may be the "grette Oak at Shelton" mentioned in a document from the time of Henry III (1216–1272). The oak is said to have been climbed by Owain Glyndŵr to view the 1403 Battle of Shrewsbury, from which its alternative name derives. In later years the tree became renowned for its hollow trunk which was variously described as able to accommodate twenty people, six people sitting for dinner or an eight-person quadrille dance. The tree had fallen by 1940 and its remains were removed in the 1950s to facilitate improvements to an adjacent road junction.

== Battle of Shrewsbury ==
The tree stood around 1.5 miles (2.4 km) from the town of Shrewsbury. The oak is believed to be mentioned in a document dating to the reign of Henry III (1216-1272) which refers to a "grette Oak at Shelton" that stood on the land of Adam Waring.

The oak is linked with a legend of Owain Glyndŵr, the last native Welshman to hold the title Prince of Wales (Welsh: Tywysog Cymru). In 1403 he marched from Wales with his men to join an army led by Henry Percy (Hotspur) who was fighting a rebellion against the English king Henry IV. His route of march was blocked by the king's men on 21 July so Owain climbed the Shelton Oak to view the progress of the Battle of Shrewsbury, some 3 miles (4.8 km) distant. From his vantage point Glyndŵr could see that Hotspur's father Henry Percy, 1st Earl of Northumberland, had not joined the battle and Hotspur's men were losing. Glyndŵr decided not to fight and retreated to Oswestry. The story is regarded as a legend as history is not certain if Glyndŵr actually marched to Shrewsbury.

== Later history ==
The Shelton Oak was pictured in Jacob George Strutt's 1822 book Sylva Britannica. In 1823 it was recorded to be at least 41 feet 6 inches (12.65 m) high; 44 feet 3 inches (13.49 m) in circumference at ground level and 27 feet 4 inches (8.33 m) at a height of 8 feet (2.4 m). It was also noted that the hollow trunk had "sufficient room for, at least, half a dozen to take a snug dinner". Until 1824, when it was sold, the land the oak stood upon was owned by the Mytton family. A report from this year noted that at a height of 1 foot 6 inches (0.46 m) the circumference of the oak was 37 feet (11 m) and at 5 feet (1.5 m) the circumference was 26 feet (7.9 m). It was noted at this time that the hollow trunk could accommodate 20 people.

During the early 19th-century a plaque was erected at the site that read: "On July XXII AD MCCCCIIII OWEN GLENDWR ascended this Tree to reconnoitre, on his march to Shrewsbury, to join the daring Hotspur, against King Henry IV; but, finding his friends were defeated, returned from this spot into Wales" (the date and year stated here, 22 July 1404, are not those of the actual battle). The tree was also known at this time as "Owen Glendwr's Observatory" and the "Glendower Oak" due to its association with the legend. An acorn from the tree was planted by the gate of Pentreheylin Hall by a Mrs Croxon in 1832 and was flourishing more than 40 years later. A report from 1878 suggests that the hollow trunk of the Shelton Oak was by then large enough for eight people to dance a quadrille within it. A second acorn from the tree was grown into a sapling and planted at The Elms in Shrewsbury by Dr Charles Waring Saxton on 5 February 1880.

By 1884 the tree was said to be "in a complete state of decay, and hollow, even in the larger ramifications". The tree had died by 1940 and the stump was removed in the 1950s to allow improvements to take place to the adjacent junction of the A5 and the Welshpool Road. On 27 January 1981, a replacement oak tree was planted by Mayor of Shrewsbury Jean Marsh on the verge adjacent to the site of the original. Shropshire Council opened the Mytton Oak Remembrance Park in 2014 and planted a descendant of the Elms oak tree (therefore "grandson" of the Shelton Oak) within its grounds.
