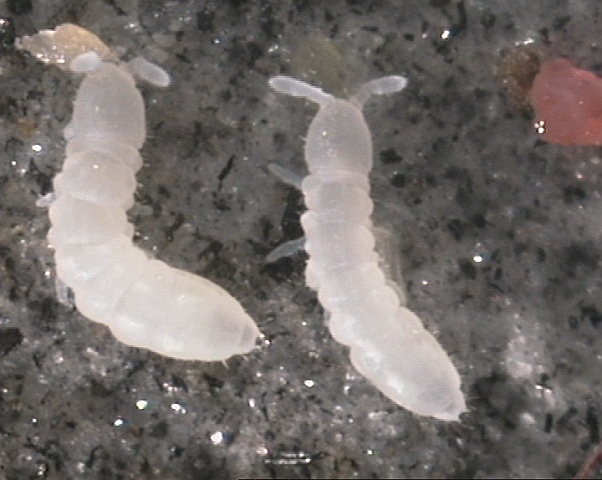
- Protaphorura armata

Scientific classification
- Domain: Eukaryota
- Kingdom: Animalia
- Phylum: Arthropoda
- Class: Collembola
- Order: Poduromorpha
- Superfamily: Onychiuroidea
- Family: Onychiuridae; Lubbock, 1867

= Onychiuridae =

Family of springtails

Onychiuridae is a family of Collembola. This family has 600 species in 51 genera.

== List of genera ==
According to Checklist of the Collembola of the World:

- Onychiurinae Lubbock, 1867
  - Cribrochiurini Weiner, 1996
    - Cribrochiurus Weiner, 1996
  - Hymenaphorurini Pomorski, 1996
    - Arneria Pomorski, 2000
    - Dinochiurus Pomorski & Steinmann, 2004
    - Heteraphorura Bagnall, 1948
    - Hymenaphorura Bagnall, 1948
    - Kalaphorura Absolon, 1901
    - Paronychiurus Bagnall, 1948
    - Probolaphorura Dunger, 1977
    - Protaphorurodes Bagnall, 1949
    - Psyllaphorura Bagnall, 1948
    - Reducturus Pomorski & Steinmann, 2004
    - Sacaphorura Pomorski & Steinmann, 2004
    - Vexaphorura Pomorski & Steinmann, 2004
    - Wandaphorura Pomorski, 2007
  - Oligaphorurini Bagnall, 1949
    - Archaphorura Bagnall, 1949
    - Chribellphorura Weiner, 1996
    - Dimorphaphorura Bagnall, 1949
    - Micraphorura Bagnall, 1949
    - Oligaphorura Bagnall, 1949
  - Onychiurini Börner, 1906
    - Absolonia Börner, 1901
    - Argonychiurus Bagnall, 1949
    - Bionychiurus Pomorski, 1996
    - Deharvengiurus Weiner, 1996
    - Deuteraphorura Absolon, 1901
    - Ongulonychiurus Thibaud & Massoud, 1986
    - Onychiuroides Bagnall, 1948
    - Onychiurus Gervais, 1841
    - Orthonychiurus Stach, 1954
    - Pilonychiurus Pomorski, 2007
    - Similonychiurus Pomorski, 2007
    - Vibronychiurus Pomorski, 1998
  - Protaphorurini Bagnall, 1949
    - Jacekaphorura Pomorski & Babenko, 2010
    - Megaphorura Fjellberg, 1998
    - Protaphorura Absolon, 1901
    - Spelaphorura Bagnall, 1948
    - Supraphorura Stach, 1954
    - Yoshiiphorura Jordana & Martínez, 2004
  - Thalassaphorurini Pomorski, 1998
    - Agraphorura Pomorski, 1998
    - Allonychiurus Yoshii, 1995
    - Detriturus Pomorski, 1998
    - Micronychiurus Bagnall, 1949
    - Sensillonychiurus Pomorski & Sveenkova, 2006
    - Spinonychiurus Weiner, 1996
    - Tantulonychiurus Pomorski, 1996
    - Thalassaphorura Bagnall, 1949
    - Uralaphorura Martynova, 1978
- Lophognathellinae Stach, 1954
    - Lophognathella Börner in Schultze, 1908
    - Ussuriaphorura Martynova, 1979
- Tetrodontophorinae Stach, 1954
    - Anodontophorus Pomorski, 2007
    - Homaloproctus Börner, 1909
    - Tetrodontophora Reuter, 1882
