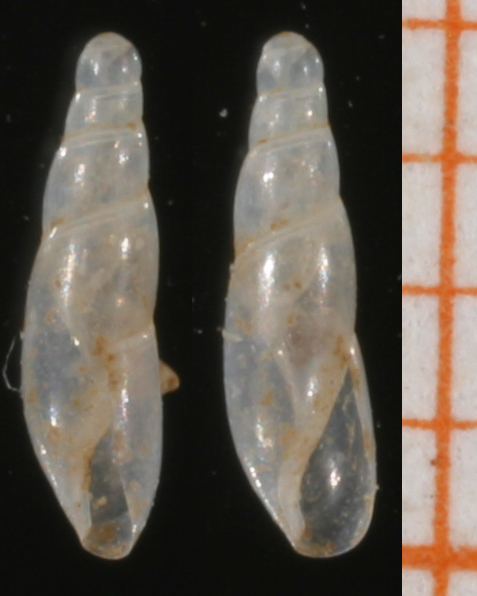
- Two fresh shells of Cecilioides acicula, scale bar in mm

Scientific classification
- Kingdom: Animalia
- Phylum: Mollusca
- Class: Gastropoda
- Order: Stylommatophora
- Superfamily: Achatinoidea
- Family: Ferussaciidae; Bourguignat, 1883

Synonyms
- Cecilioididae Mörch, 1864; Ferrussacidae Bourguignat, 1883 (incorrect original spelling); Ferrussaciidae Bourguignat, 1883 (incorrect spelling)

= Ferussaciidae =

Ferussaciidae Temporal range: Upper Eocene-Recent

Family of gastropods

Ferussaciidae is a family of air-breathing land snails, terrestrial pulmonate gastropod mollusks in the superfamily Achatinoidea.

This family has no subfamilies. The family name Ferussaciidae is from 1883 and therefore it is more recent than the family name Cecilioididae Mörch, 1864. However, the latter has been declared as a nomen oblitum because it had not been used for over 100 years. Ferussaciidae has been declared a nomen protectum.

== Distribution ==
The distribution of Ferussaciidae includes Africa to Europe and the Near East, tropical Americas, Hawaii and tropical Asia.

== Fossil record ==
Cecilioides sommeri is the family's oldest fossil record, dating from the Middle Paleocene of Brazil (Itaboraí Basin).

== Anatomy ==
In this family, the number of haploid chromosomes lies between 26 and 30 (according to the values in this table).

== Genera ==
Genera within the family Ferussaciidae include: (The following unreferenced, unchecked genera are probably from Schileyko (1999))

- Amphorella Lowe, 1852
- Calaxis Letourneux & Bourguignat, 1887
- Cecilioides Férussac, 1814
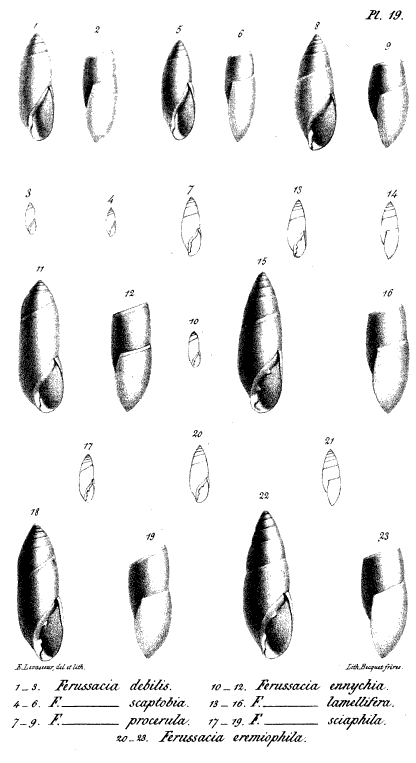
- Several members of the family Ferussaciidae. Sketches from 1856.
  Coilostele Benson, 1864
- Conollya Odhner, 1932
- Cylichnidia R. T. Lowe, 1852
- Digoniaxis Jousseaume, 1889
- Ferussacia Risso, 1826 - type genus of the family Ferussaciidae
- Geostilbia Crosse, 1867
- Hohenwartiana Bourguignat, 1864
- Karolus Folin, 1870
- Pseudocalaxis Pallary, 1912
- Sculptiferussacia Germain, 1911
