= Neanura persimilis =

Scientific classification
- Domain: Eukaryota
- Kingdom: Animalia
- Phylum: Arthropoda
- Class: Collembola
- Order: Poduromorpha
- Family: Neanuridae
- Tribe: Neanurini
- Genus: Neanura
- Species: N. persimilis

Binomial name
- Neanura persimilis Mills, 1934

Species of springtail

Neanura persimilis is a species of springtail in the family Neanuridae.
