= Neanura magna =

Scientific classification
- Domain: Eukaryota
- Kingdom: Animalia
- Phylum: Arthropoda
- Class: Collembola
- Order: Poduromorpha
- Family: Neanuridae
- Tribe: Neanurini
- Genus: Neanura
- Species: N. magna

Binomial name
- Neanura magna (Macgillivray, 1893)

Synonyms
- Anoura magna MacGillivray, 1893

Species of springtail

Neanura magna, the bear-bodied springtail, is a species of springtail in the family Neanuridae.
