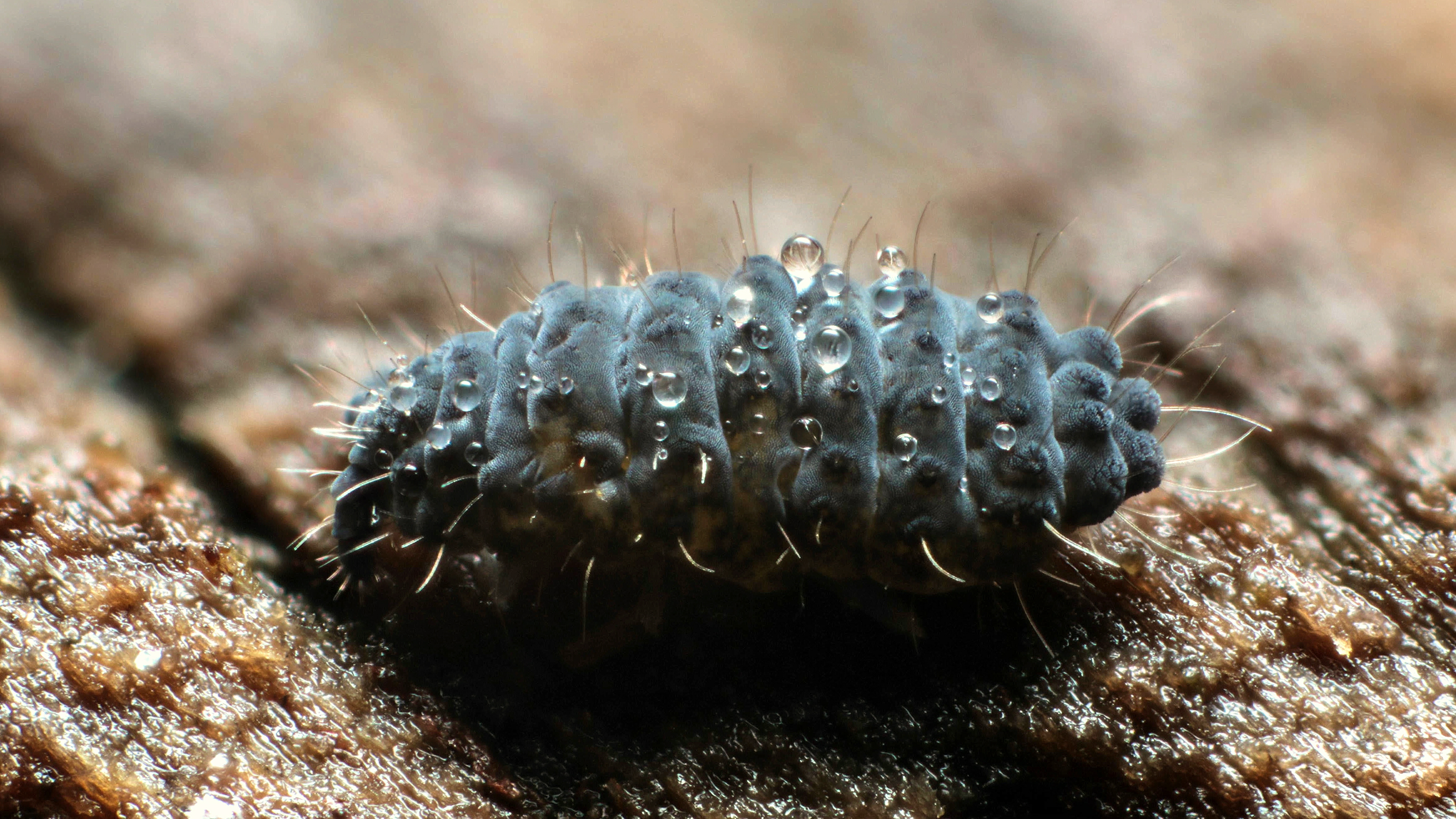

Scientific classification
- Kingdom: Animalia
- Phylum: Arthropoda
- Class: Collembola
- Order: Poduromorpha
- Family: Neanuridae
- Genus: Neanura
- Species: N. muscorum

Binomial name
- Neanura muscorum (Templeton, 1835)

Synonyms
- N. tuberculata (Nicolet, 1842)

= Neanura muscorum =

Species of springtail

Neanura muscorum is a species of Collembola, which are commonly called springtails, in the family Neanuridae and subfamily Neanurinae. It is extremely common and most often found under bark (in Europe).

== Characteristics ==
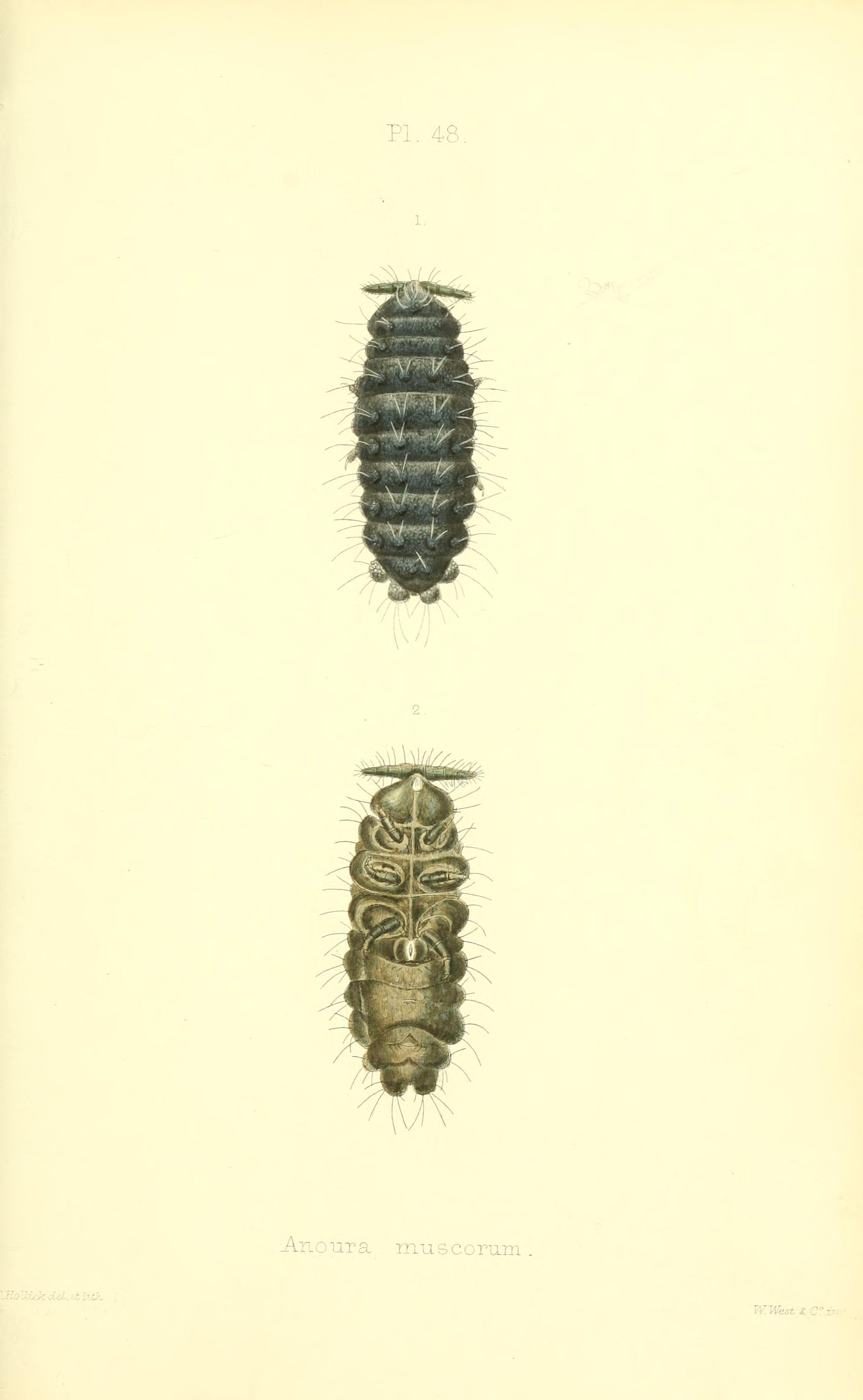
Illustration of N. muscorum.

Neanura muscorum is 3.5 mm in length and is covered in warty bumps and long setae. It is blueish grey and has three ocelli. It lacks a furca. It eats small plants and fungi growing on the bark. It, like many other Collembola, serves as prey for a lot of predatory arthropods.
