= Neanura growae =

Scientific classification
- Domain: Eukaryota
- Kingdom: Animalia
- Phylum: Arthropoda
- Class: Collembola
- Order: Poduromorpha
- Family: Neanuridae
- Tribe: Neanurini
- Genus: Neanura
- Species: N. growae

Binomial name
- Neanura growae Christiansen & Bellinger, 1980

Species of springtail

Neanura growae is a species of springtail in the family Neanuridae.
