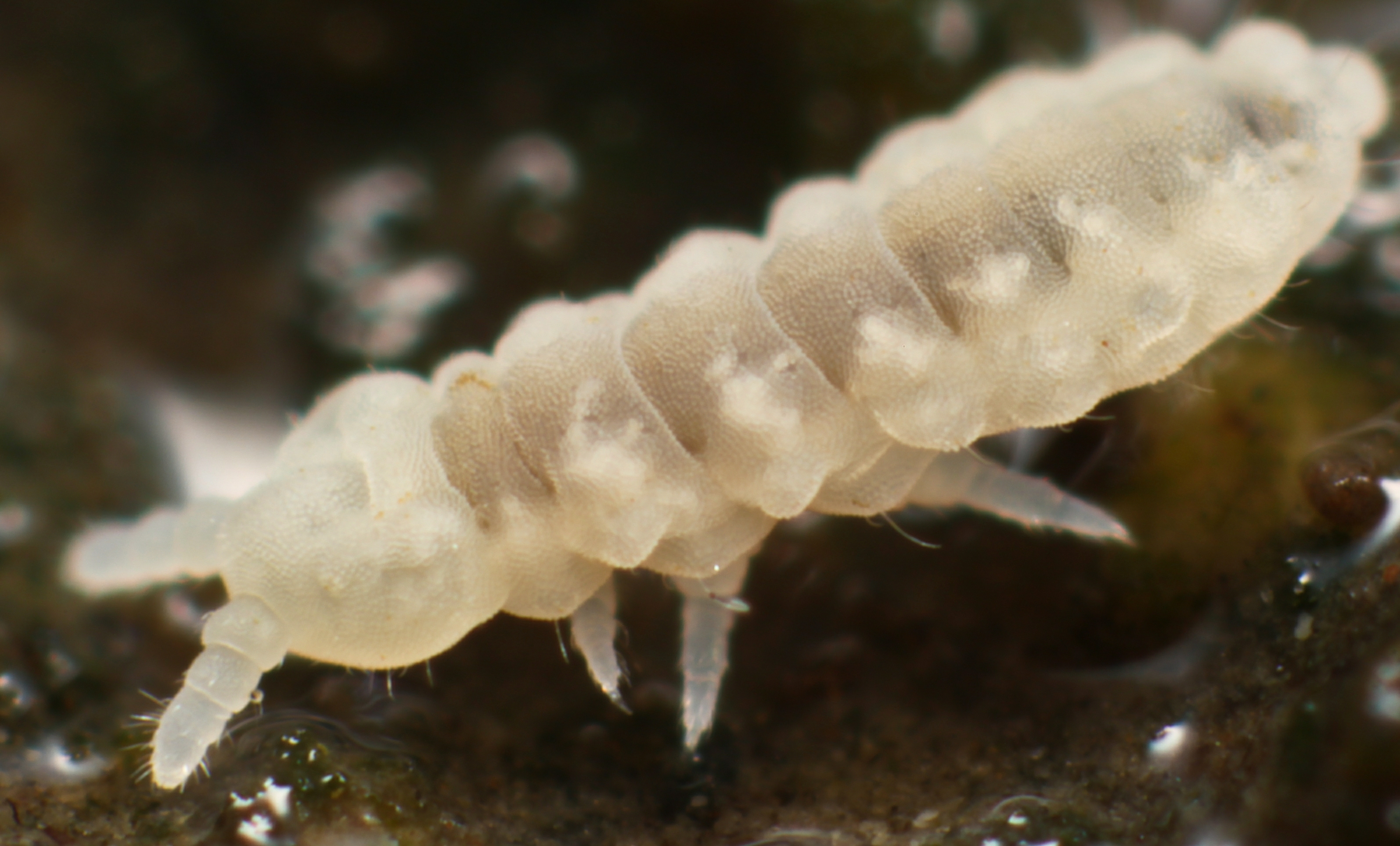
- Anurida granaria

Scientific classification
- Kingdom: Animalia
- Phylum: Arthropoda
- Clade: Pancrustacea
- Class: Collembola
- Order: Poduromorpha
- Superfamily: Neanuroidea
- Family: Neanuridae
- Subfamily: Pseudachorutinae; Börner, 1906

= Pseudachorutinae =

Subfamily of springtails

Pseudachorutinae is a subfamily of springtails in the family Neanuridae. There are more than 50 genera and 200 described species in Pseudachorutinae.

Most genre in the Pseudachorutinae require microscopy via cheotaxy and a vaternal view, as well as an eye count and information on the behavior of side to or dorsal setae in relation to the body.

== Genera ==
These 57 genera belong to the subfamily Pseudachorutinae:

- Acanthanura Börner, 1906
- Aethiopella Handschin, 1942
- Aethiopellina Delamare, 1951
- Anurachorutes Kuznetsova & Potapov, 1988
- Anurida Laboulbene, 1865
- Anuridella Willem, 1906
- Anuritelsa Womersley, 1939
- Arlesia Handschin, 1942
- Arlesiella Delamare-Deboutteville, 1951
- Brasilimeria Stach, 1949
- Cassagnaudina Massoud, 1967
- Cassagnaurida Salmon, 1964
- Cephalachorutes Bedos & Deharveng, 1991
- Ceratrimeria Börner, 1906
- Delamarellina Rapoport & Rubio, 1963
- Forsteramea Salmon, 1965
- Furculanurida Massoud, 1967
- Gamachorutes Cassagnau, 1978
- Gastranurida Bagnall, 1949
- Grananurida Yosii, 1954
- Halachorutes Arlé, 1966
- Handschinurida
- Holacanthella Börner, 1906
- Hylaeanura Arlé, 1966
- Intermediurida Najt, Thibaud & Weiner, 1990
- Israelimeria Weiner & Kaprus, 2005
- Kenyura Salmon, 1954
- Koreanurina Najt & Weiner, 1992
- Lanzhotia Rusek, 1985
- Linnaniemia Philiptschenko, 1927
- Megalanura Ellis & Bellinger, 1973
- Meganurida Carpenter, 1935
- Micranurida Börner, 1901
- Minotaurella Weiner, 1999
- Najtafrica Barra, 2002
- Neotropiella Handschin, 1942
- Notachorudina Cassagnau & Rapoport, 1962
- Oudemansia Schött, 1893
- Paranurida Skarzynski & Pomors, 1994
- Philotella Najt & Weiner, 1985
- Platanurida Carpenter, 1925
- Pongeia Najt & Weiner, 2002
- Pratanurida Rusek, 1973
- Protachorutes Cassagnau, 1955
- Pseudachorudina Stach, 1949
- Pseudachorutella Stach, 1949
- Pseudachorutes Tullberg, 1871
- Pseudanurida Schött, 1901
- Quatacanthella Salmon, 1945
- Rusekella Deharveng, 1982
- Sernatropiella
- Simonachorutes
- Stachorutes Dallai, 1973
- Tasmanura Womersley, 1937
- Tijucameria de Mendonca & Fernandes, 2005
- Venezuelida Diaz & Najt, 1995
- Womersleymeria Stach, 1949
