= Friesea tilbrooki =

Scientific classification
- Kingdom: Animalia
- Phylum: Arthropoda
- Clade: Pancrustacea
- Class: Collembola
- Order: Poduromorpha
- Family: Neanuridae
- Genus: Friesea
- Species: F. tilbrooki

Binomial name
- Friesea tilbrooki Wise, 1970

Species of springtail

Friesea tilbrooki is a species of springtail belonging to the family Neanuridae. The species was first described by Keith Arthur John Wise in 1964. The species was first described by Keith Arthur John Wise in 1970, and is found in South Georgia and other Subantarctic islands including Bouvet Island, Heard Island and Macquarie Island.

== Taxonomy ==
The species was first described in 1970 by Keith Arthur John Wise based on specimens found on South Georgia island. He named the species after British zoologist Peter Tillbrook.

== Description ==
Friesea tilbrooki is pale blue in colour with white underside, and body length of up to 2.2 mm (0.087 in). It is morphologically similar to F. multispinosa, but can be distinguished by the presence of three sense-rods on antennae IV, fewer abdominal spines, and no presence of an internal tooth on the claw.

== Distribution and habitat ==
The species is found in many subantarctic islands, including South Georgia, Bouvet Island, Macquarie Island and Heard Island. The species is exclusively found in marine littoral zones.
