= Friesea grisea =

Scientific classification
- Domain: Eukaryota
- Kingdom: Animalia
- Phylum: Arthropoda
- Class: Collembola
- Order: Poduromorpha
- Family: Neanuridae
- Genus: Friesea
- Species: F. grisea

Binomial name
- Friesea grisea (Schaffer, 1891)

Synonyms
- Achorutoides antarcticus Wahlgren, 1908

Species of springtail

Friesea grisea is a species of springtail in the genus Friesea, native to South Georgia, Antarctica.

It was originally thought to be a "pan-Antarctic" species however this was later disproven as three distinct species were recognized (Friesea antarctica, Friesea gretae, Friesea propria).
