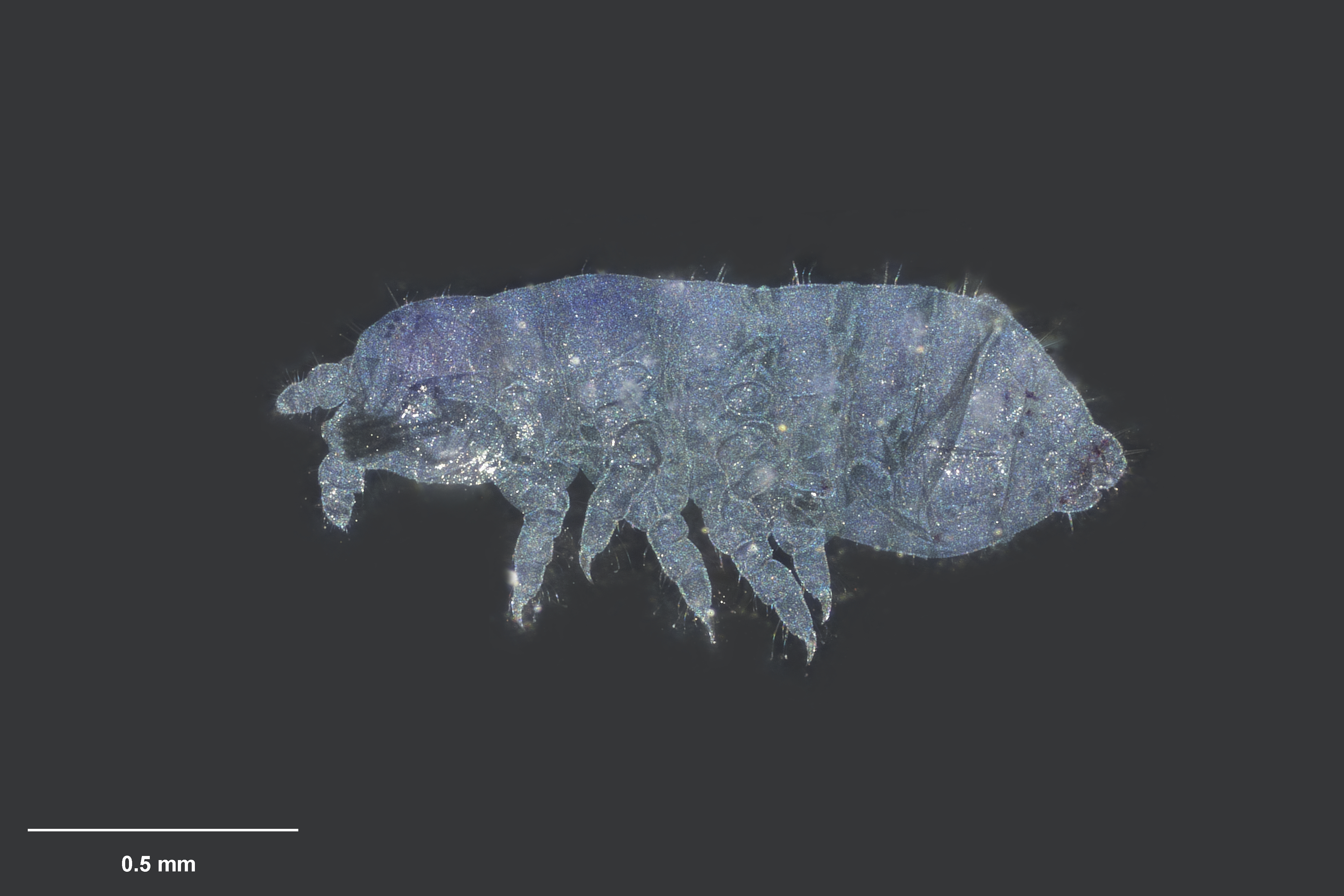
- Type specimen of Friesea litoralis from the collections of Te Papa

Scientific classification
- Domain: Eukaryota
- Kingdom: Animalia
- Phylum: Arthropoda
- Class: Collembola
- Order: Poduromorpha
- Family: Neanuridae
- Genus: Friesea
- Species: F. litoralis

Binomial name
- Friesea litoralis (Wise, 1964)

Synonyms
- Colonavis litoralis Wise, 1964; Friesea littoralis Massoud, 1967

= Friesea litoralis =

Species of springtail

Friesea litoralis is a species of springtail belonging to the family Neanuridae. The species was first described by Keith Arthur John Wise in 1964. The species is native to Campbell Island in the New Zealand Subantarctic Islands.

== Taxonomy ==
The species was first described as Colonavis litoralis in 1964 by Keith Arthur John Wise. Wise placed the species within Colonavis and not Friesea due to the absence of furcula, tenaculum and spine papillae, and presence of serrate setae. In 1967 Zaher Massoud placed the species within the genus Friesea.

== Description ==
Friesea litoralis is dark blue to black in colour.

== Distribution ==
The species is known to occur in the Campbell Islands. The holotype of the species was found at Lookout Bay underneath stones and kelp, with further paratypes found at Lookout Bay and Smoothwater Bay.
