= Paravietnura insolita =

- Figures 9–21; Paravietnura insolita sp. n.: 9 dorsal chaetotaxy of head and Th. I (holotype) 10 dorsal chaetotaxy of Ant.

Scientific classification
- Kingdom: Animalia
- Phylum: Arthropoda
- Clade: Pancrustacea
- Class: Collembola
- Order: Poduromorpha
- Family: Neanuridae
- Genus: Paravietnura
- Species: P. insolita

Binomial name
- Paravietnura insolita Smolis & Kuznetsova, 2018

Species of springtail

Paravietnura insolita is a species of springtail belonging to the family Neanuridae.

Body length without antennae is 1.10-1.35 mm. Body with blue pigmented. Body tubercles well developed. Two pigmented 2+2 black eyes found on each side of head. Mouth parts reduced. Body short and squarish. Ordinary chaetae possess four types - long macrochaetae, short macrochaetae, very short macrochaetae and mesochaetae.
