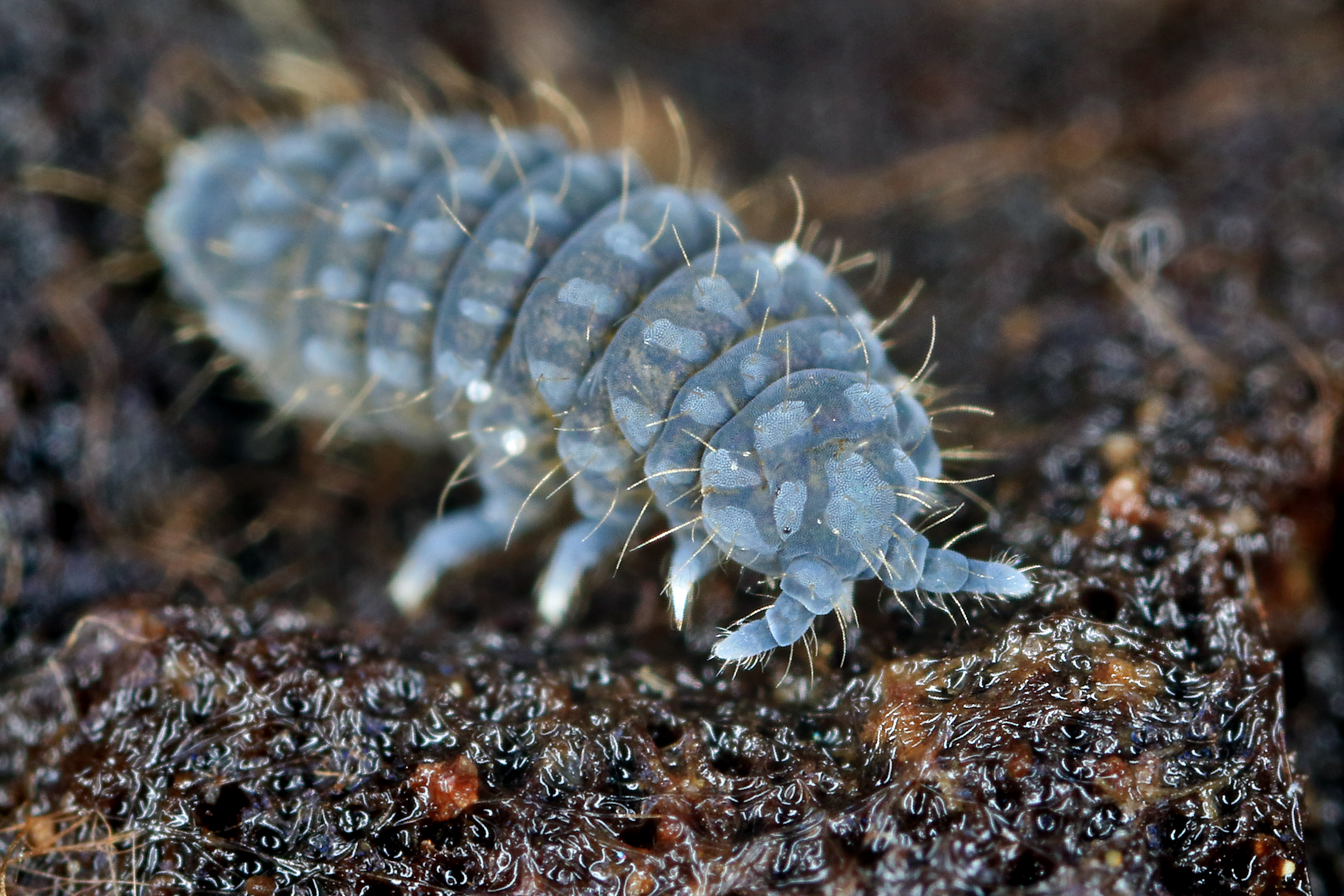

Scientific classification
- Kingdom: Animalia
- Phylum: Arthropoda
- Clade: Pancrustacea
- Class: Collembola
- Order: Poduromorpha
- Family: Neanuridae
- Genus: Deutonura
- Species: D. monticola

Binomial name
- Deutonura monticola (P.Cassagnau, 1954)

= Deutonura monticola =

Species of springtail

Deutonura monticola is a species of springtail that belongs to the family Neanuridae. It was described by Paul Cassagnau in 1954.
