= Odontella =

Odontella is the scientific name of two genera of organisms and may refer to:

- Odontella (diatom), a genus of diatoms in the family Triceratiaceae
- Odontella (springtail), a genus of insects in the family Odontellidae
