= Caputanurininae =

Scientific classification
- Domain: Eukaryota
- Kingdom: Animalia
- Phylum: Arthropoda
- Class: Collembola
- Order: Poduromorpha
- Superfamily: Neanuroidea
- Family: Neanuridae
- Subfamily: Caputanurininae; Lee, 1983

Subfamily of springtails

Caputanurininae is a subfamily of springtails in the family Neanuridae. There are at least two genera and at least one described species, Caputanurina sinensis, in Caputanurininae.

== Genera ==
These two genera belong to the subfamily Caputanurininae:

- Caputanurina Lee, 1983
- Leenurina Najt & Weiner, 1992
