= Frieseinae =

Scientific classification
- Domain: Eukaryota
- Kingdom: Animalia
- Phylum: Arthropoda
- Class: Collembola
- Order: Poduromorpha
- Superfamily: Neanuroidea
- Family: Neanuridae
- Subfamily: Frieseinae; Massoud, 1967

Subfamily of springtails

Frieseinae is a subfamily of springtails in the family Neanuridae. There are 4 genera and more than 200 described species in Frieseinae.

== Genera ==
- Friesea Dalla Torre, 1895
- Gisinea Massoud, 1965
- Halofriesea Yoshii & Sawada, 1997
- Tremoisea Cassagnau, 1973
