= Odontella cornifer =

Scientific classification
- Domain: Eukaryota
- Kingdom: Animalia
- Phylum: Arthropoda
- Class: Collembola
- Order: Poduromorpha
- Family: Odontellidae
- Genus: Odontella
- Species: O. cornifer

Binomial name
- Odontella cornifer Mills, 1934

Species of springtail

Odontella cornifer is a species of springtail in the family Odontellidae.
