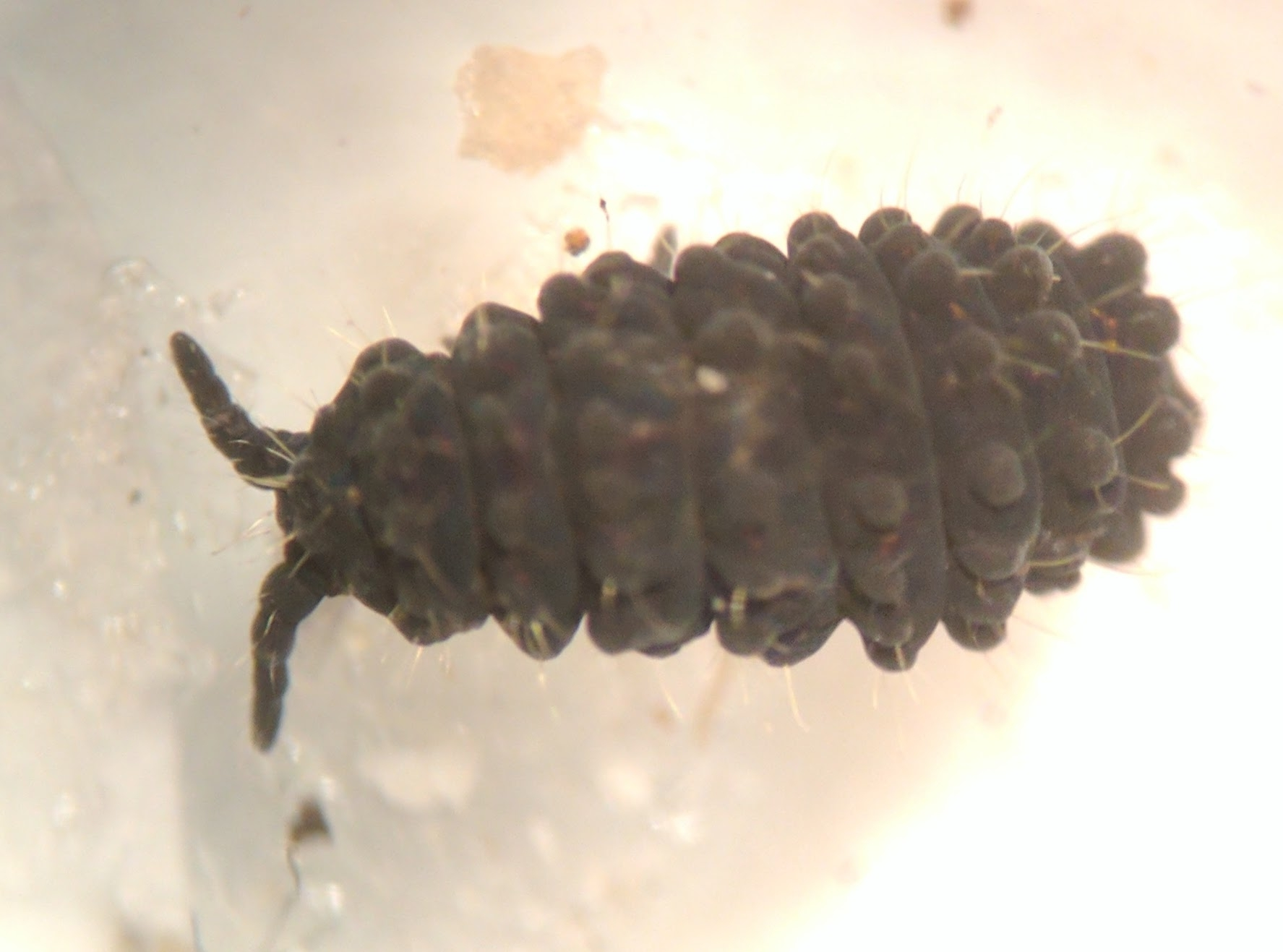

Scientific classification
- Domain: Eukaryota
- Kingdom: Animalia
- Phylum: Arthropoda
- Class: Collembola
- Order: Poduromorpha
- Family: Neanuridae
- Genus: Morulina
- Species: M. crassa

Binomial name
- Morulina crassa Christiansen & Bellinger, 1980

= Morulina crassa =

Species of springtail

Morulina crassa is a species of springtail in the family Neanuridae.
