= Pseudachorutes aureofasciatus =

Scientific classification
- Domain: Eukaryota
- Kingdom: Animalia
- Phylum: Arthropoda
- Class: Collembola
- Order: Poduromorpha
- Family: Neanuridae
- Genus: Pseudachorutes
- Species: P. aureofasciatus

Binomial name
- Pseudachorutes aureofasciatus (Harvey, 1898)

Synonyms
- Gnathocephalus aureofasciatus Harvey, 1898

Species of springtail

Pseudachorutes aureofasciatus is a species of springtail in the family Neanuridae.
