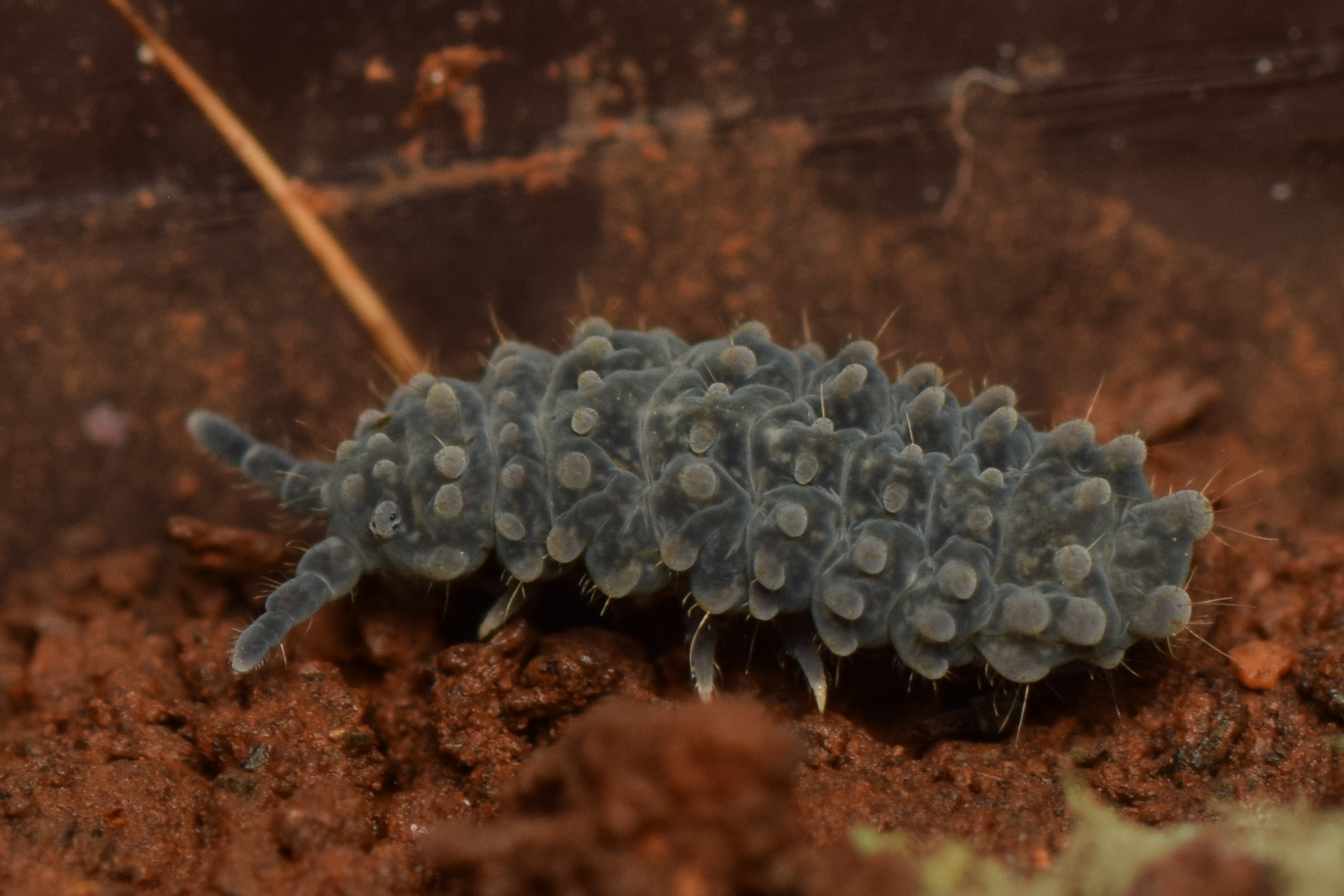

Scientific classification
- Domain: Eukaryota
- Kingdom: Animalia
- Phylum: Arthropoda
- Class: Collembola
- Order: Poduromorpha
- Family: Neanuridae
- Genus: Morulina
- Species: M. multatuberculata

Binomial name
- Morulina multatuberculata (Coleman, 1941)

Synonyms
- Neanura multatuberculata Coleman, 1941

= Morulina multatuberculata =

Species of springtail

Morulina multatuberculata is a species of springtail in the family Neanuridae.
