= Morulininae =

Scientific classification
- Domain: Eukaryota
- Kingdom: Animalia
- Phylum: Arthropoda
- Class: Collembola
- Order: Poduromorpha
- Superfamily: Neanuroidea
- Family: Neanuridae
- Subfamily: Morulininae

Subfamily of springtails

Morulininae is a subfamily of springtails in the family Neanuridae. There are at least 2 genera and about 11 described species in Morulininae.

== Genera ==
These two genera belong to the subfamily Morulininae:

- Morulina Borner, 1906
- Promorulina Cassagnau, 1997
