= Charles Macnamara =

Canadian photographer, entomologist, historian, and field naturalist

Charles Macnamara (1870 – December 23, 1944) was an amateur photographer, entomologist, historian, and field naturalist born in Quebec City, Quebec. He had a twin brother named Richard (Dickie), who died at the age of 10 due to typhoid fever. In 1880, his family moved to Arnprior, Ontario. When Macnamara left high school at the age of 14 in 1885, he joined his father in working for the McLachlin Brothers lumbering firm until 1936 where he worked six days a week as a bookkeeper. Despite his busy work schedule, he managed to maintain meticulously detailed documents on nature; including beavers, orchids, and soil insects.

Between late 1909 and early 1910, Macnamara built a log cabin as a stopping-off place for studying to study nature and the woods near Arnprior. Over the fireplace, he painted the Ojibway motto No-piming en-dad jawen-imid – "The dweller in the woods is always happy." This phrase later inspired the name of the Nopiming Game Reserve which was set up by Macnamara in 1920 near Arnprior so that the local and migratory wildlife would have a safe habitat. In August that year, he discovered and described a new species of Pseudachorutes (Collembola). He also spent 14 years observing and documenting a beaver colony near Marshall's Bay. The Macnamara Field Naturalist's Club, founded in 1984, was named after him.

He learned French and German, exchanged letters with European booksellers and scientists and took correspondence courses with Cornell University where he completed a science degree. While he participated in more social activities in his youth, most of his intellectual life took place over long distance and he became a recluse in his later years. This was made evident by the fact that he declined to meet a German scientist he had corresponded with when the scientist visited Montreal. Macnamara wrote many articles for the Ottawa Field Naturalist's Club and contributed to other publications such as the Canadian Field-Naturalist, the Journal of the American Museum of Natural History, and the British Journal of Photography.
