= Triaena =

Sphenophorina may refer to two different taxa:

- Triaena Hübner, 1827, a synonym for Acronicta, a genus of moths
- Triaena Tullberg, 1871, a synonym for Friesea, a genus of springtails
