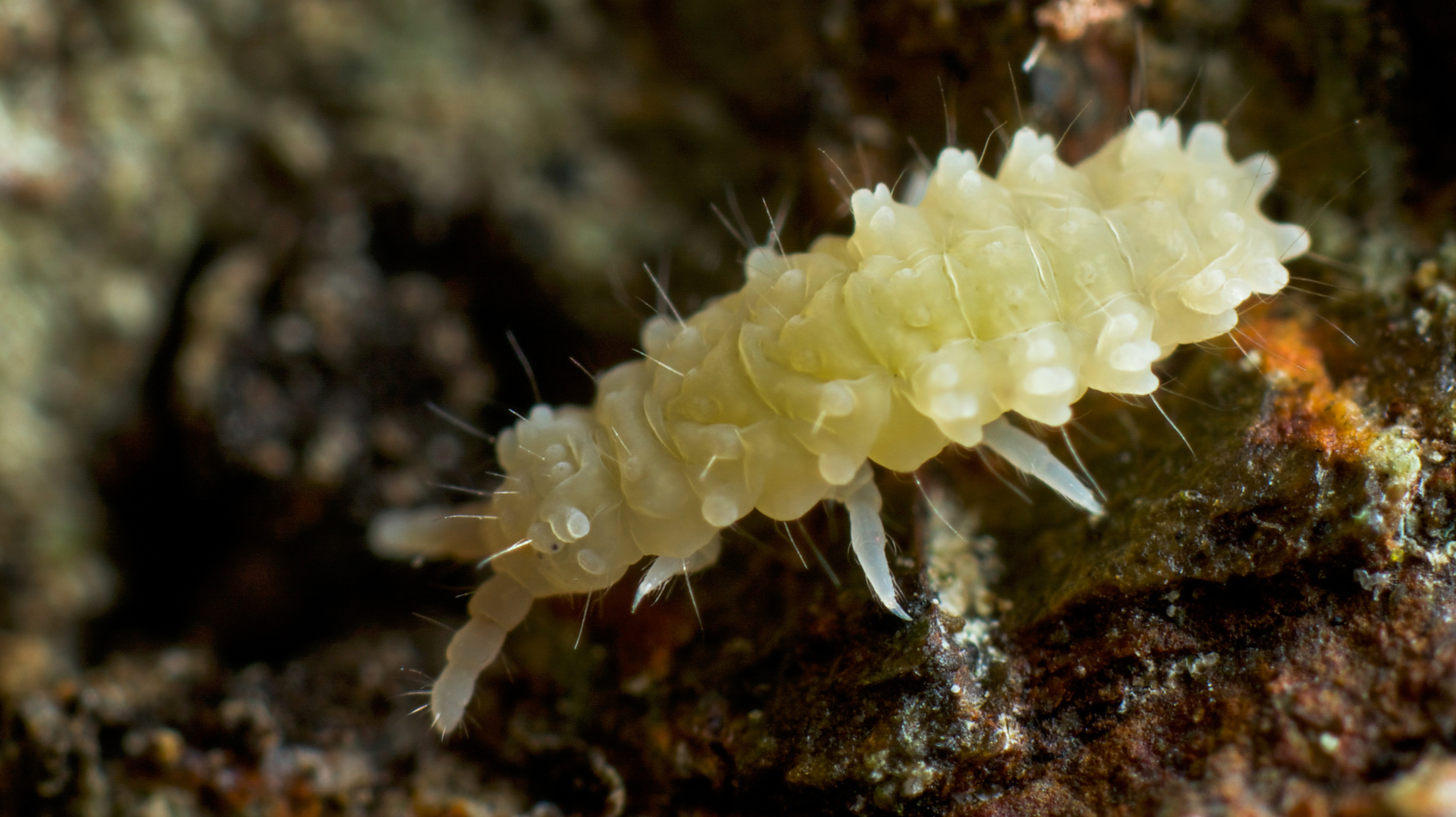

Scientific classification
- Kingdom: Animalia
- Phylum: Arthropoda
- Class: Collembola
- Order: Poduromorpha
- Family: Neanuridae
- Subfamily: Neanurinae; Börner, 1901

Tribes
- 6, see text

Synonyms
- Bilobidae Stach, 1951

= Neanurinae =

Subfamily of springtails

The subfamily Neanurinae contains pudgy short-legged springtails of the order Poduromorpha. It was established by Carl Börner in 1901 – or rather, it is the result of taxa being split out of Börner's family (initially proposed as a subfamily, but this had to be changed when springtails were discovered to be closely related to but not actually insects) whereas the type genus and its closest relatives were retained here.

Like other Neanuridae, they are stout-bodied springtails with vestigial furcula, making them essentially unable to jump. Like their relatives, they lack anal thorns and have primitive ocelli.

== Systematics ==
There are six tribes of Neanurinae currently recognized. Some notable genera are also listed here:

- Neanurini
  - Deutonura
  - Edoughnura Deharveng, Kroua & Bedons, 2007
  - Endonura
  - Neanura
  - Protanura
- Morulodini
- Lobellini
- Paleonurini
  - Bilobella
- Paranurini
- Sensillanurini

In addition, there are several genera incertae sedis, which cannot be assigned robustly to a tribe:

- Echinanura
- Paravietnura
- Graniloba
- Pseudadbiloba
- Pseudobiloba
- Zealandmeria
