= Paravietnura notabilis =

Scientific classification
- Kingdom: Animalia
- Phylum: Arthropoda
- Class: Collembola
- Order: Poduromorpha
- Family: Neanuridae
- Genus: Paravietnura
- Species: P. notabilis

Binomial name
- Paravietnura notabilis Smolis & Kuznetsova, 2018

Species of springtail

Paravietnura notabilis is a species of springtail belonging to the family Neanuridae.

Body length without antennae is 0.85 mm. Body with blue pigmented. Body tubercles well developed. Two pigmented 2+2 black eyes found on each side of head. Mouth parts reduced. Body stumpy and relatively short. Ordinary chaetae possess four types - long macrochaetae, short macrochaetae, very short macrochaetae and mesochaetae.
