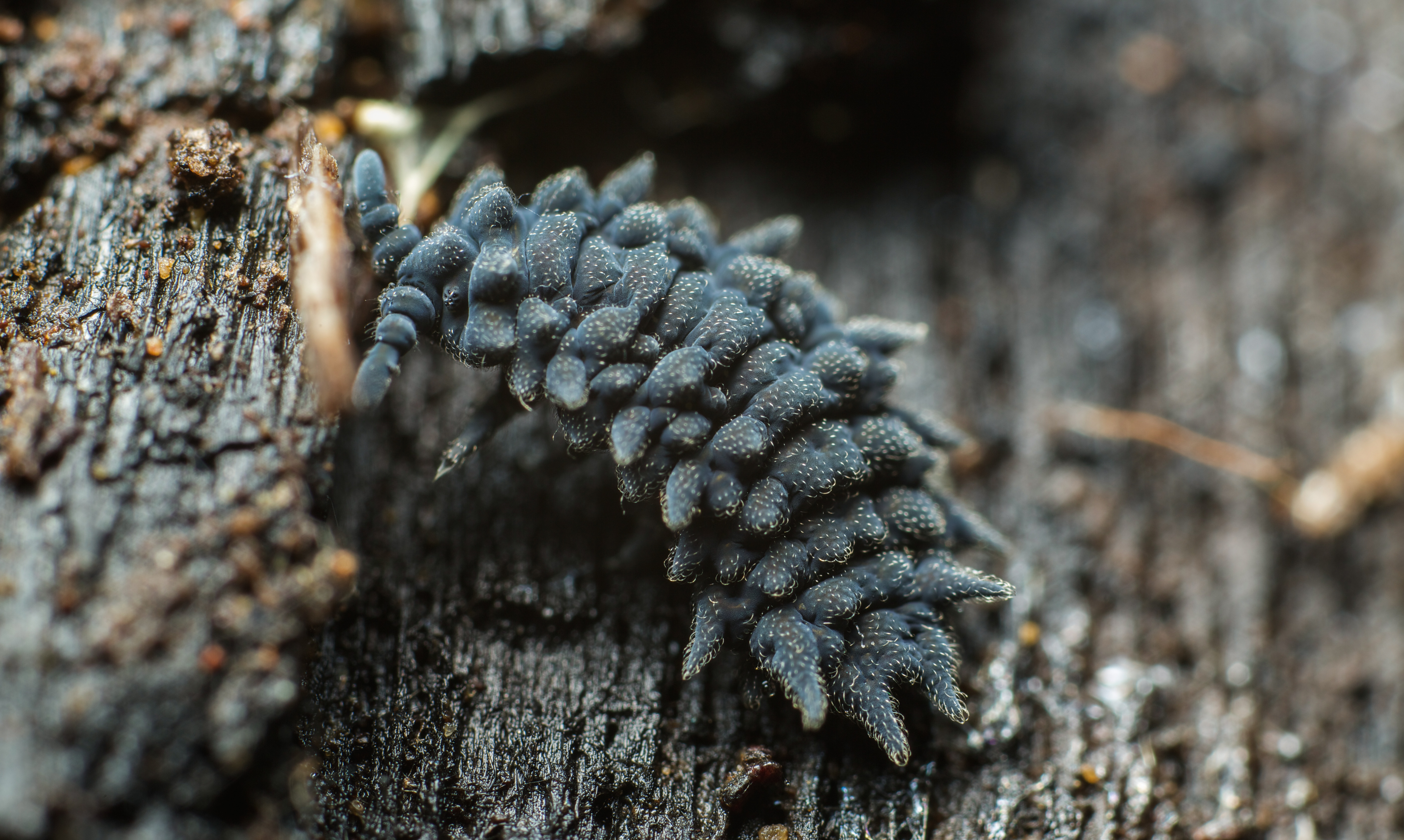
- Uchidanurinae

Scientific classification
- Kingdom: Animalia
- Phylum: Arthropoda
- Clade: Pancrustacea
- Class: Collembola
- Order: Poduromorpha
- Superfamily: Neanuroidea
- Family: Neanuridae
- Subfamily: Uchidanurinae; Salmon, 1964

= Uchidanurinae =

Subfamily of springtails

Uchidanurinae is a subfamily of springtails in the family Neanuridae. There are at least three genera and at least one described species, Denisimeria caudata, in Uchidanurinae.

== Genera ==
These three genera belong to the subfamily Uchidanurinae:

- Assamanura Cassagnau, 1980
- Denisimeria Massoud, 1964
- Uchidanura Yosii, 1954
