= Paleonura =

Scientific classification
- Domain: Eukaryota
- Kingdom: Animalia
- Phylum: Arthropoda
- Class: Collembola
- Order: Poduromorpha
- Family: Neanuridae
- Genus: Paleonura; P. Cassagnau, 1982

Genus of springtails

Paleonura is a genus of springtails within the family Neanuridae. Members of this genus are found distributed in Central and South America.

== Species ==
- Paleonura aberdarensis Cassagnau, 1996
- Paleonura africana Cassagnau, 1996
- Paleonura angustior (Rusek, 1971)
- Paleonura anophthalma Cassagnau, 1991
- Paleonura anosyennica Cassagnau, 1996
- Paleonura badaga Cassagnau, P, 1988
- Paleonura barbata Cassagnau, P, 1988
- Paleonura bilinskii Pasnik & Weiner, 2013
- Paleonura borincana Palacios-Vargas, JG, Soto-Adames & FN, 2017
- Paleonura carayoni Massoud & Thibaud, 1987
- Paleonura cassagnaui Weiner, WM et Najt, J, 1998
- Paleonura coalescens Cassagnau, 1996
- Paleonura colimana Palacios-Vargas, JG et Gómez-Anaya, JA, 1995
- Paleonura daniae Palacios-Vargas, JG et Díaz, M, 1992
- Paleonura decorata Cassagnau, P, 1988
- Paleonura deharvengi Cassagnau, 1991
- Paleonura dejeani Cassagnau, 1996
- Paleonura dilatata Deharveng, L et Bedos, A, 1993
- Paleonura epiphytica Smolis, A et Deharveng, L, 2003
- Paleonura formosana (Yosii, R, 1965)
- Paleonura ganesh Cassagnau, 1991
- Paleonura guadalcanarae (Yosii, 1960)
- Paleonura guae (Yoshii, 1976)
- Paleonura gurung Cassagnau, 1991
- Paleonura ili (Christiansen, K & Bellinger, P, 1992)
- Paleonura indrabahadouri Cassagnau, 1991
- Paleonura insularum (Carpenter, 1935)
- Paleonura irregularis Cassagnau, 1991
- Paleonura khumbica (Cassagnau, 1971)
- Paleonura lamjungensis Cassagnau, 1991
- Paleonura lanna Deharveng, L et Bedos, A, 1993
- Paleonura limnophila (Cassagnau & Rapoport, 1962)
- Paleonura loebli Cassagnau, P, 1988
- Paleonura lonavlana (Yosii, 1966)
- Paleonura louisi Thibaud & Najt, 1993
- Paleonura macronychia Cassagnau, P, 1988
- Paleonura miniseta Massoud & Thibaud, 1987
- Paleonura monochaeta Deharveng, L et Bedos, A, 1993
- Paleonura monophthalma (Yosii, 1966)
- Paleonura nuda Cassagnau & Oliveira, 1990
- Paleonura paurochaetosa Cassagnau, 1991
- Paleonura pescadorius Palacios-Vargas, JG et Gómez-Anaya, JA, 1995
- Paleonura petebellingeri Palacios-Vargas, JG et Simón-Benito, JC, 2007
- Paleonura plumosa Cassagnau, 1996
- Paleonura reducta (Yosii, 1966)
- Paleonura rosacea (Schött, H, 1917)
- Paleonura saproxylica Smolis & Kadej, 2014
- Paleonura setikholensis Cassagnau, 1991
- Paleonura siva (Yosii, 1966)
- Paleonura spectabilis Cassagnau, P, 1982
- Paleonura trisetosa Cassagnau, 1991
