= Paravietnura =

- Figures 9–21; Paravietnura insolita sp. n.: 9 dorsal chaetotaxy of head and Th. I (holotype) 10 dorsal chaetotaxy of Ant. III–IV 11 ventral chaetotaxy of Ant. III 12 dorsal chaetotaxy of Abd. V–VI 13 furca rudimentary 14 chaeta Di1 of Abd. IV 15 chaeta Di1 of Abd. V 16 sensillum of Abd. V 17 labrum 18 labium. Paravietnura notabilis sp. n.: 19 labium 20 labrum. Vietnura caerulea Deharveng and Bedos, 2000: 21 labium.

Scientific classification
- Kingdom: Animalia
- Phylum: Arthropoda
- Clade: Pancrustacea
- Class: Collembola
- Order: Poduromorpha
- Family: Neanuridae
- Subfamily: Neanurinae
- Genus: Paravietnura; Smolis & Kuznetsova, 2018

Type species
- Paravietnura notabilis Smolis & Kuznetsova, 2018

Genus of springtails

Paravietnura, is a genus of springtails belonging to the family Neanuridae. The genus contains 2 species restricted to Russia.

Body with blue pigmented. Body tubercles well developed. Two pigmented eyes found on each side of head. Mouth parts reduced.

== Species ==
- Paravietnura insolita Smolis & Kuznetsova, 2018
- Paravietnura notabilis Smolis & Kuznetsova, 2018
