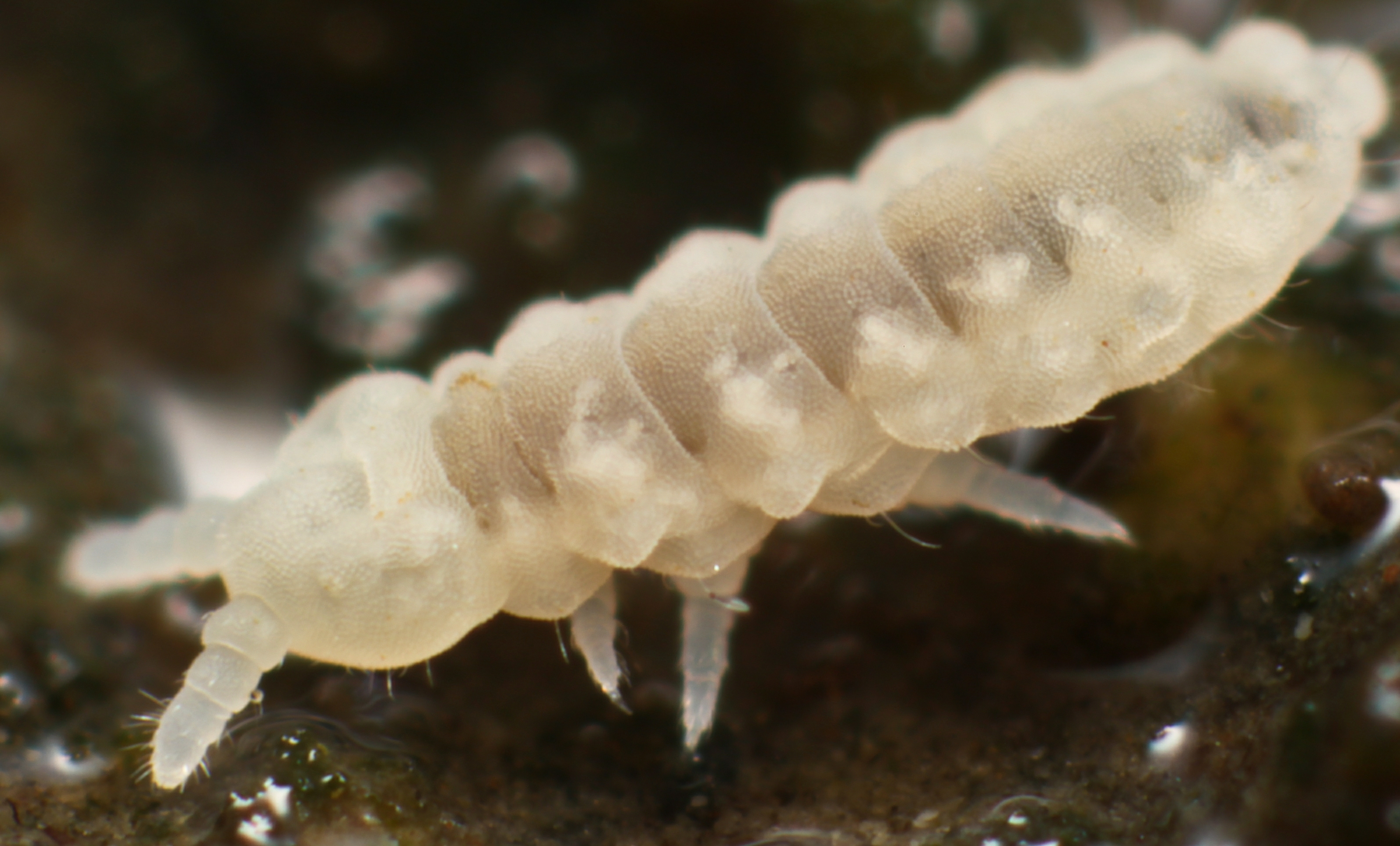

Scientific classification
- Kingdom: Animalia
- Phylum: Arthropoda
- Clade: Pancrustacea
- Class: Collembola
- Order: Poduromorpha
- Family: Neanuridae
- Genus: Anurida
- Species: A. granaria

Binomial name
- Anurida granaria Nicolet, 1847

= Anurida granaria =

Species of springtail

Anurida granaria is a species of springtail of the family Neanuridae described by Swiss entomologist Hercule Nicolet in 1847. One common name for the species is granary short-legged springtail.
