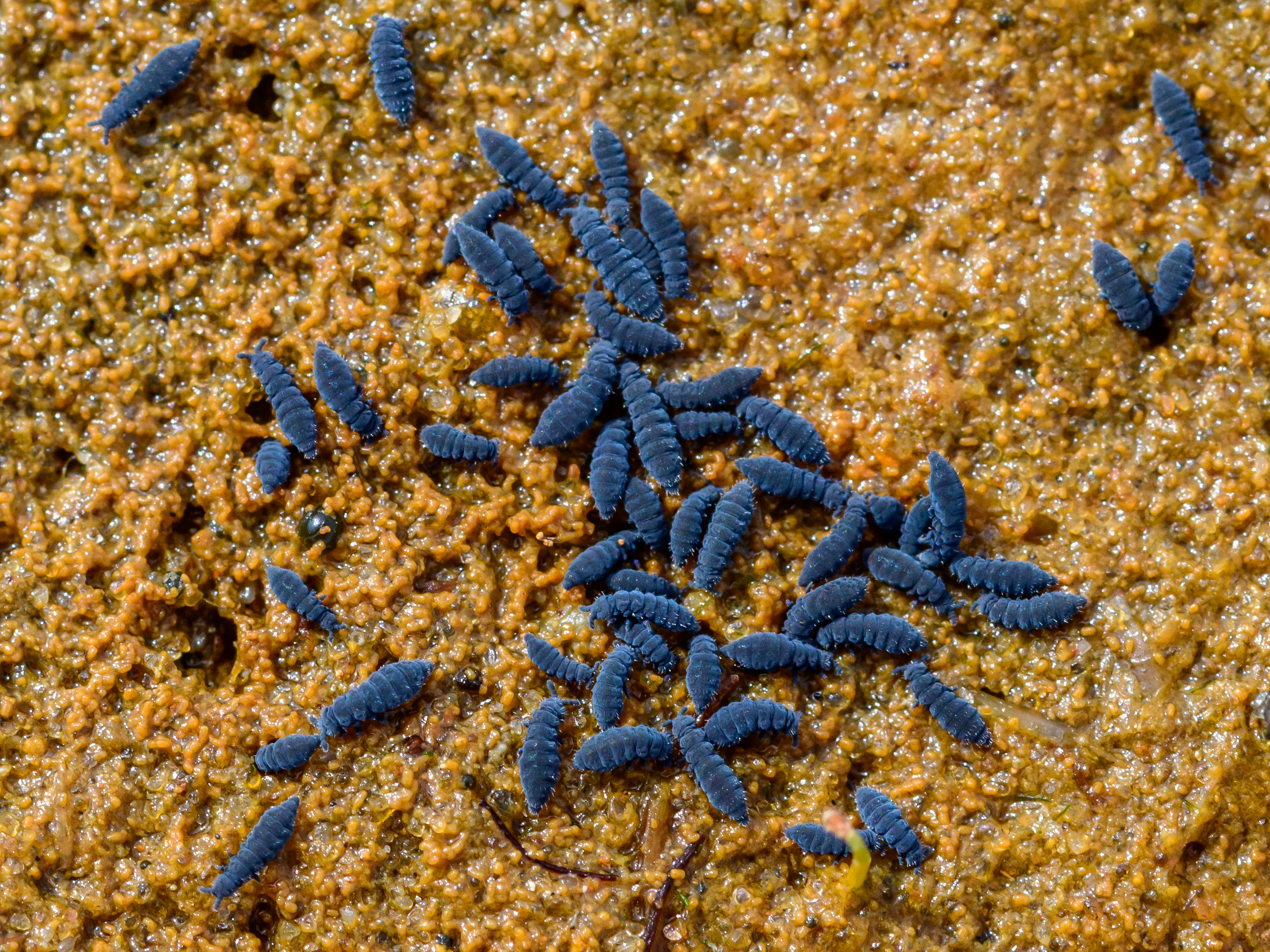
- Anurida maritima

Scientific classification
- Kingdom: Animalia
- Phylum: Arthropoda
- Class: Collembola
- Order: Poduromorpha
- Family: Neanuridae
- Subfamily: Pseudachorutinae
- Genus: Anurida; Laboulbène, 1865

= Anurida =

Genus of springtails

Anurida is a genus of Collembola belonging to the family Neanuridae.

The genus was first described by Laboulbène in 1865.

The genus has cosmopolitan distribution.

Selected species:

- Anurida granaria (Nicolet, 1847)
- Anurida maritima (Guérin-Méneville, 1836)
