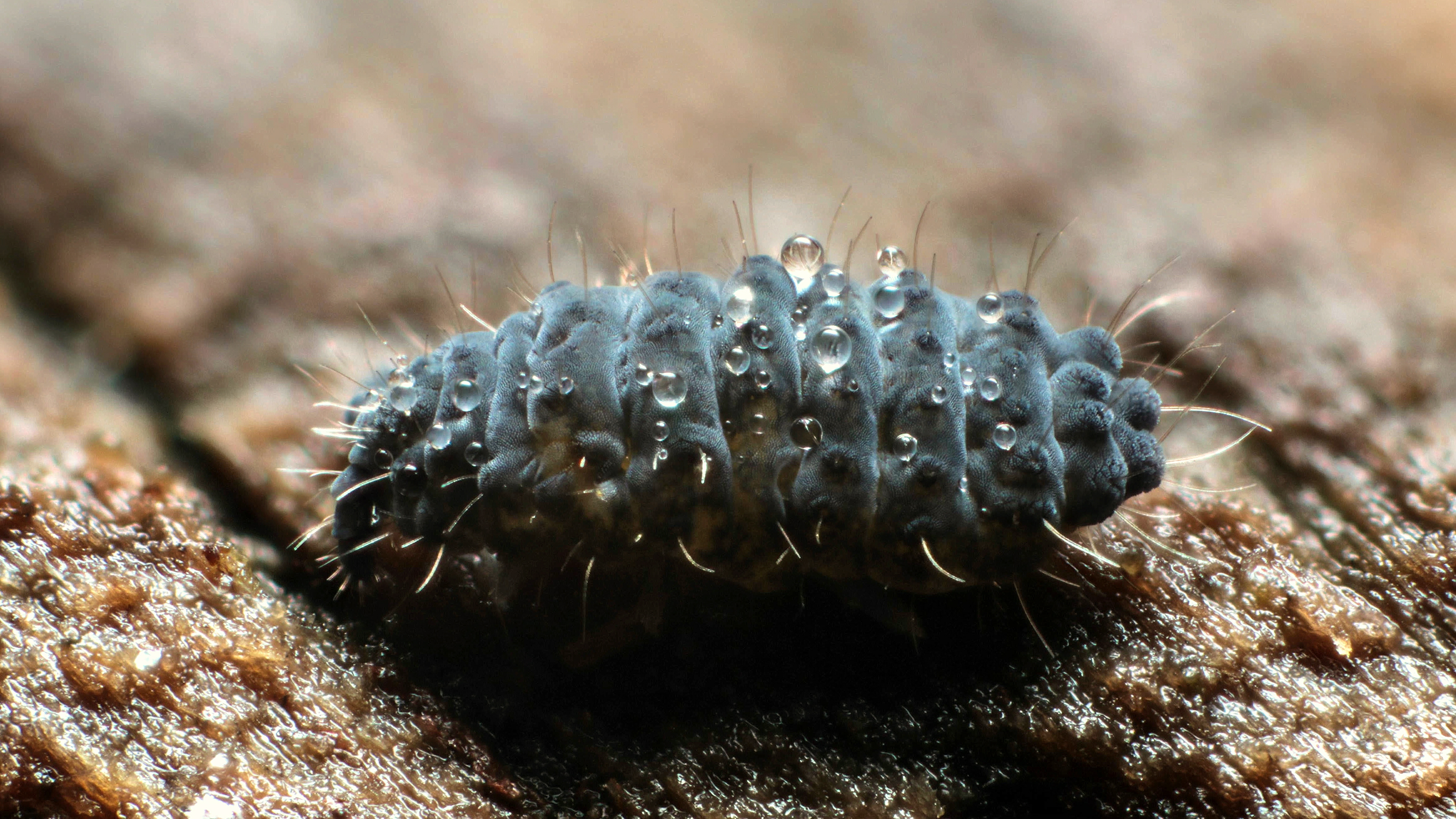
- Neanura muscorum

Scientific classification
- Domain: Eukaryota
- Kingdom: Animalia
- Phylum: Arthropoda
- Class: Collembola
- Order: Poduromorpha
- Family: Neanuridae
- Subfamily: Neanurinae
- Tribe: Neanurini
- Genus: Neanura; MacGillivray, 1893

= Neanura =

Genus of springtails

Neanura is a genus of springtails in the family Neanuridae. There are more than 30 described species in Neanura.

== Species ==
These 39 species belong to the genus Neanura:

- Neanura alba von Toerne, 1956
- Neanura aleo Christiansen & Bellinger, 1992
- Neanura aleuta (Bodvarsson, 1960)
- Neanura ambigua Christiansen & Bellinger, 1980
- Neanura aurantiaca (Caroli, 1912)
- Neanura bara Christiansen & Bellinger, 1980
- Neanura barberi (Handschin, 1928)
- Neanura bullsa Wray, 1953
- Neanura capitata (Folsom, 1932)
- Neanura citronella Carpenter, 1904
- Neanura coronifera Axelson, 1905
- Neanura deharvengi Smolis, Shayanmehr & Yoosefi, 2018
- Neanura eburnea Gisin, 1963
- Neanura giselae Gisin, 1950
- Neanura growae Christiansen & Bellinger, 1980
- Neanura hawaiiensis (Bellinger & Christainsen, 1974)
- Neanura ili Christiansen & Bellinger, 1992
- Neanura illina Christiansen & Bellinger, 1980
- Neanura insularum Carpenter, 1934
- Neanura judithae Smolis & Deharveng, 2017
- Neanura magna (Macgillivray, 1893) (bear-bodied springtail)
- Neanura minuta Gisin, 1963
- Neanura muscorum (Templeton, 1835)
- Neanura ornata Folsom, 1902
- Neanura pallida Deharveng, 1979
- Neanura palmeri Wray, 1967
- Neanura parva (Stach, 1951)
- Neanura persimilis Mills, 1934
- Neanura pini Becker, 1948
- Neanura prima (Bodvarsson, 1960)
- Neanura pseudoparva Rusek, 1963
- Neanura reticulata Axelson, 1905
- Neanura rosea (Gervais, 1842)
- Neanura serrata Folson, 1916
- Neanura servata Folsom
- Neanura setosa Canby, 1926
- Neanura tundricola Fjellberg
- Neanura villosa (Kos, 1940)
- Neanura weigneri (Stach, 1922)
