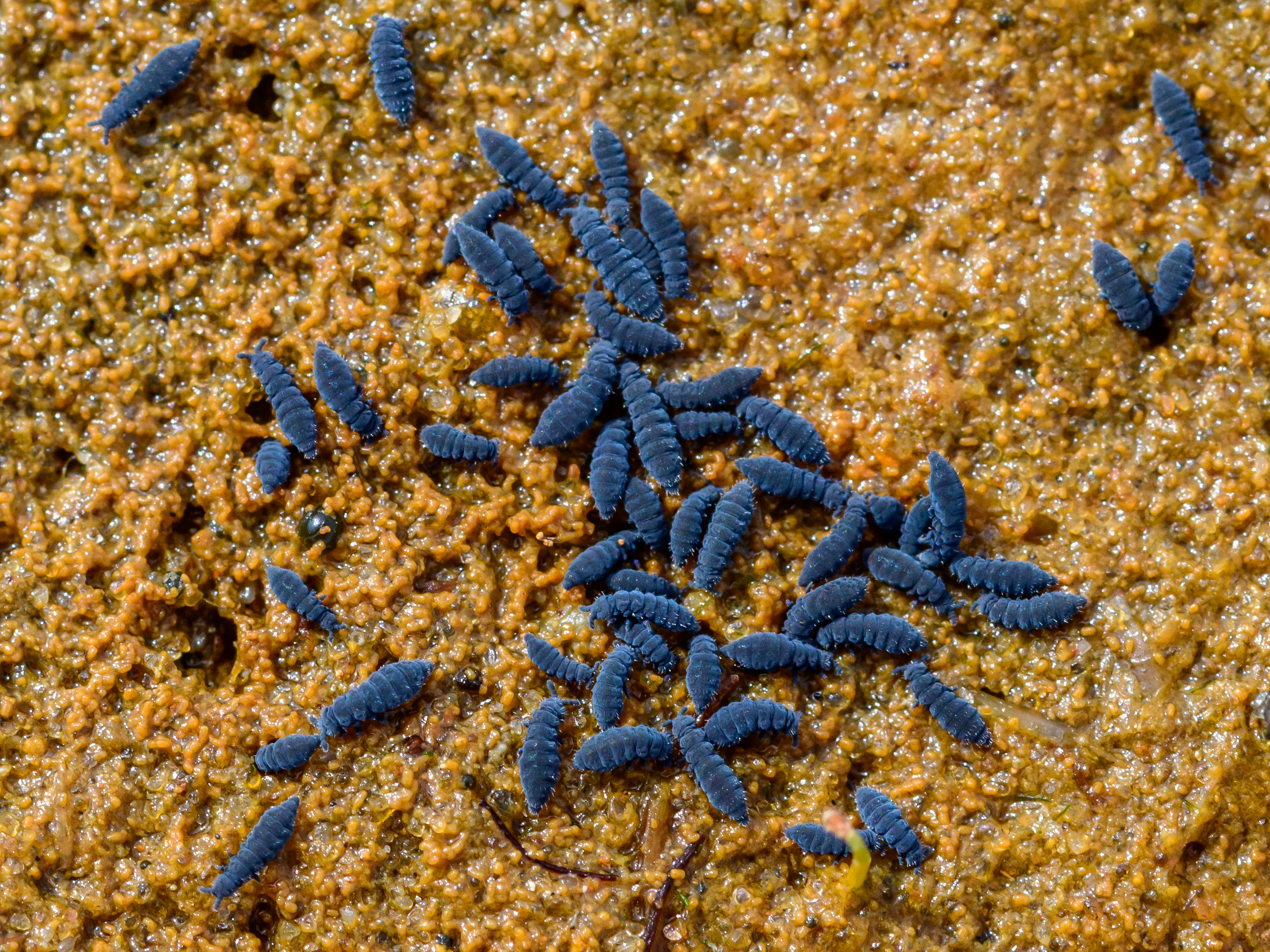
- An aggregation of A. maritima

Scientific classification
- Kingdom: Animalia
- Phylum: Arthropoda
- Clade: Pancrustacea
- Class: Collembola
- Order: Poduromorpha
- Family: Neanuridae
- Genus: Anurida
- Species: A. maritima

Binomial name
- Anurida maritima (Guérin-Méneville, 1836)

Synonyms
- Lipura maritima (Guérin-Méneville, 1836)

= Anurida maritima =

Species of springtail

Anurida maritima, the seashore springtail or rock springtail, is a cosmopolitan collembolan of the intertidal zone. It is often found in aggregations of up to several hundred on the surface of rock-pools.

== Description ==
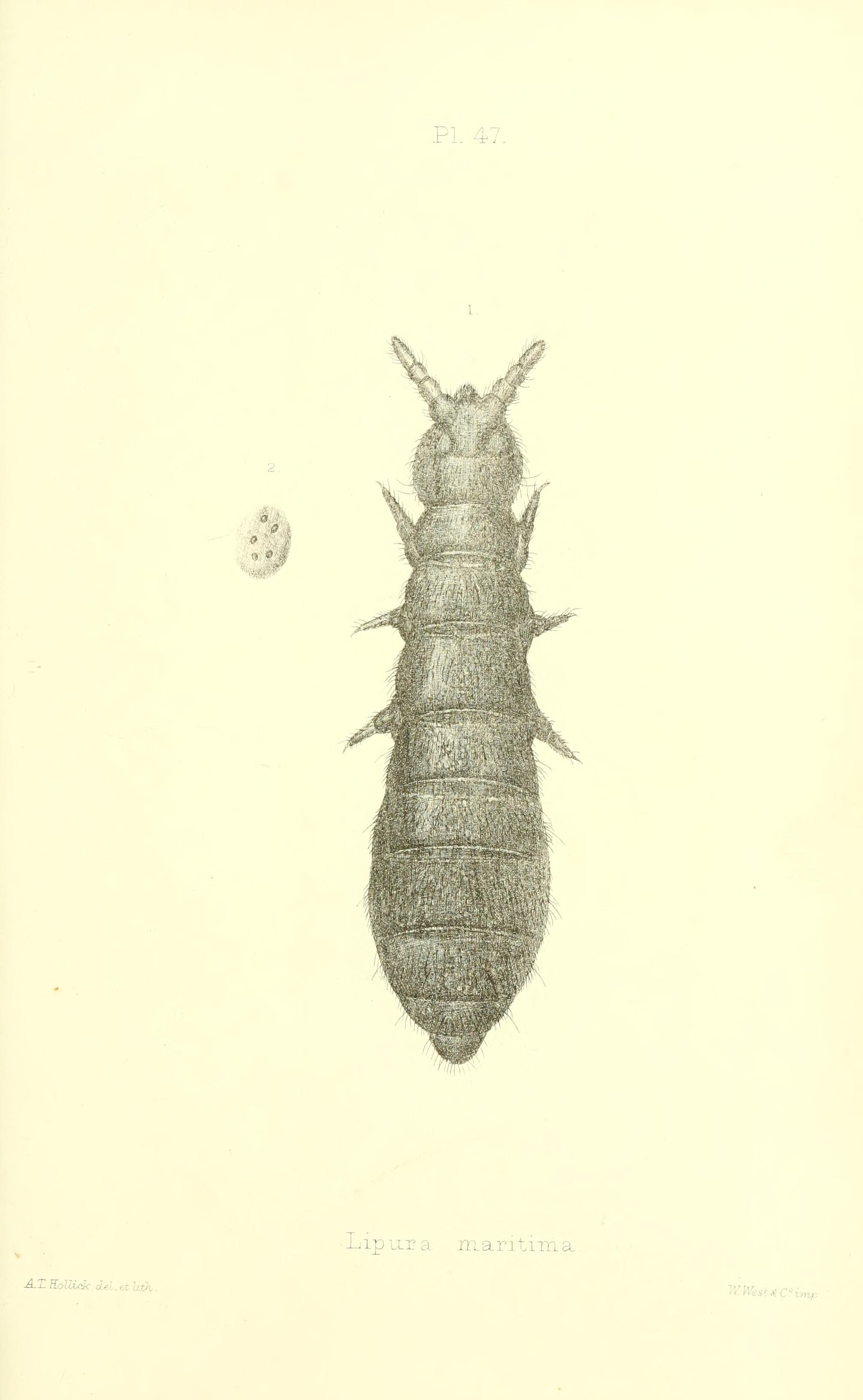
Illustration of A. maritima.

Anurida maritima is a wingless animal, typically up to 3 mm long, and dark slaty blue in colour. Its body is roundish, expanding slightly towards the rear. The head bears a pair of eyes and a single pair of antennae, the thorax comprises three body segments, each of which bears one pair of legs, while the abdomen comprises six segments. The entire body is covered with white hydrophobic hairs which allow the animal to stay above the surface of the water on which it spends much of its life. Unlike other springtails, A. maritima cannot leap, since its furcula is vestigial. This is apparently because when other springtails are placed upon water, surface tension unfolds their furcula and renders them unable to jump, so it has probably been lost by disuse.

== Distribution ==
Anurida maritima is found around the world on rocky shores and tidal marshes. In the British Isles, it is missing from the north-east of Scotland and has not been recorded from south-east Ireland. It is also absent from the Baltic Sea. There have been suggestions that the animals found in northern Europe may be a different species from that found in the Mediterranean Sea.

== Ecology ==
Anurida maritima is a significant scavenger of the upper intertidal zone, feeding on dead animals, chiefly crustaceans (including barnacles) and molluscs.

Aggregation is an important aspect of collembolan biology, and A. maritima has been shown to produce an aggregating pheromone. Like many intertidal animals, A. maritima moves in rhythm with the tidal cycle, and has an endogenous circatidal rhythm with a period of 12.4 hours, using visual cues to orient themselves during their movements.

In the warmer parts of its range, A. maritima is active throughout the year, but in cooler temperate regions, it is only active in the summer months, overwintering as eggs.
