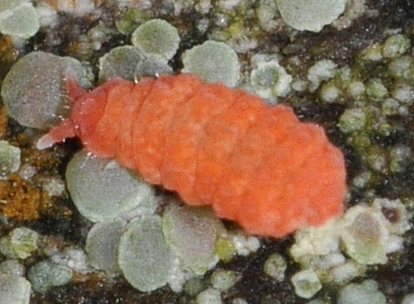

Scientific classification
- Kingdom: Animalia
- Phylum: Arthropoda
- Clade: Pancrustacea
- Class: Collembola
- Order: Poduromorpha
- Family: Neanuridae
- Genus: Bilobella
- Species: B. braunerae

Binomial name
- Bilobella braunerae L. Deharveng, 1981

= Bilobella braunerae =

Species of springtail

Bilobella braunerae is a species of springtail of the family Neanuridae described by French entomologist Louis Deharveng in 1981.
