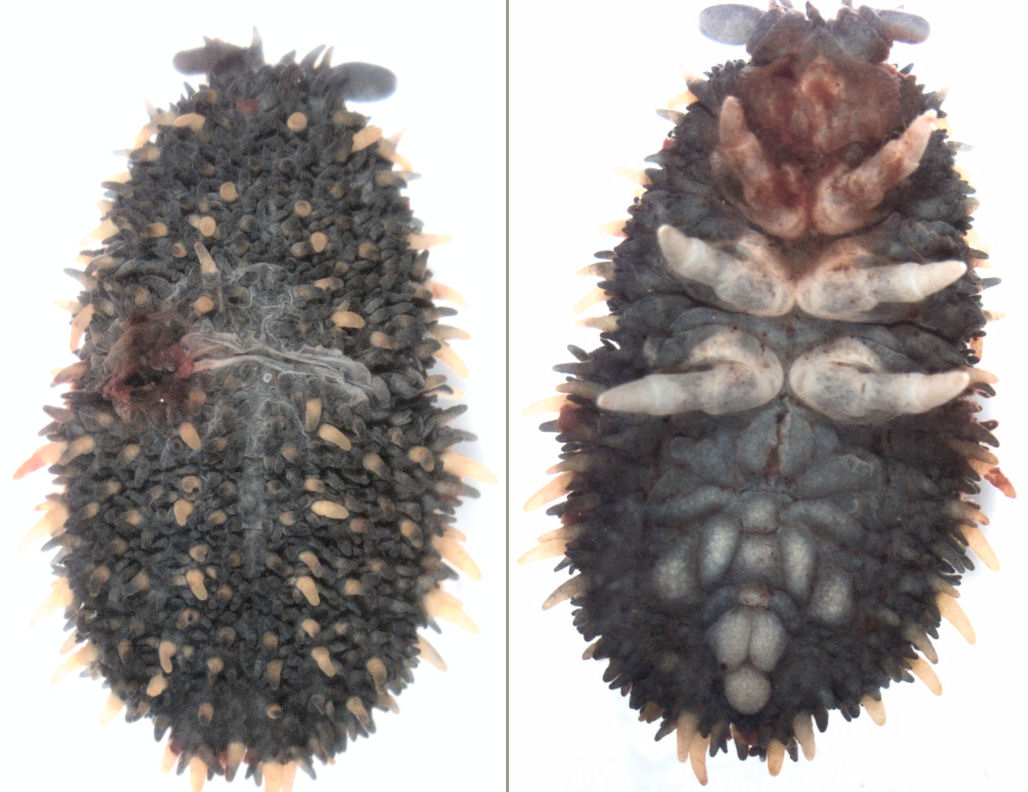

Scientific classification
- Kingdom: Animalia
- Phylum: Arthropoda
- Clade: Pancrustacea
- Class: Collembola
- Order: Poduromorpha
- Family: Neanuridae
- Subfamily: Pseudachorutinae
- Genus: Holacanthella; Börner, 1906

= Holacanthella =

Genus of springtails

Holacanthella is a genus of giant springtails in the family Neanuridae, found only in New Zealand. Up to 17 mm in length, they are the largest springtails in the world.

== Description ==
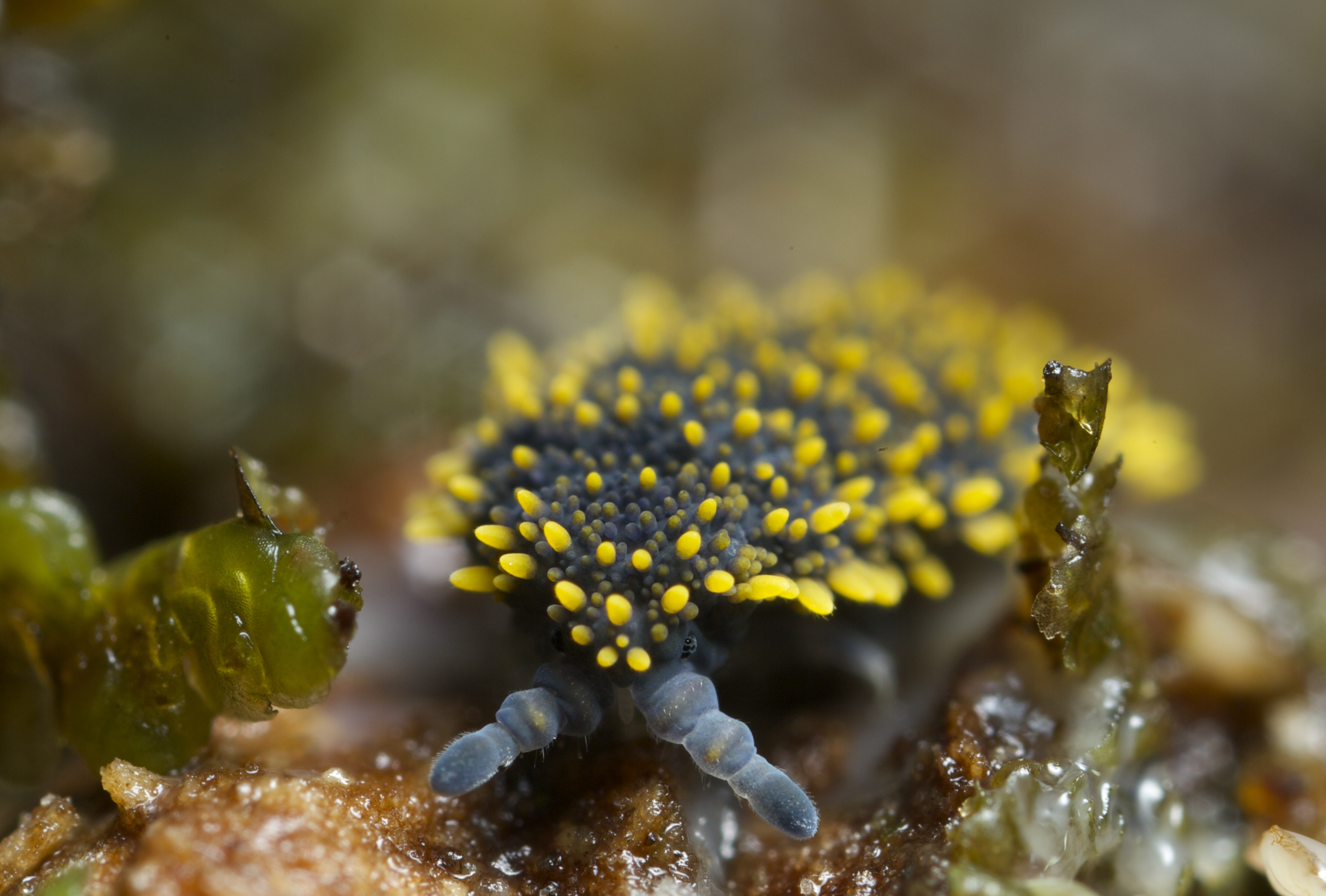
Holacanthella spinosa, Franz Josef, New Zealand

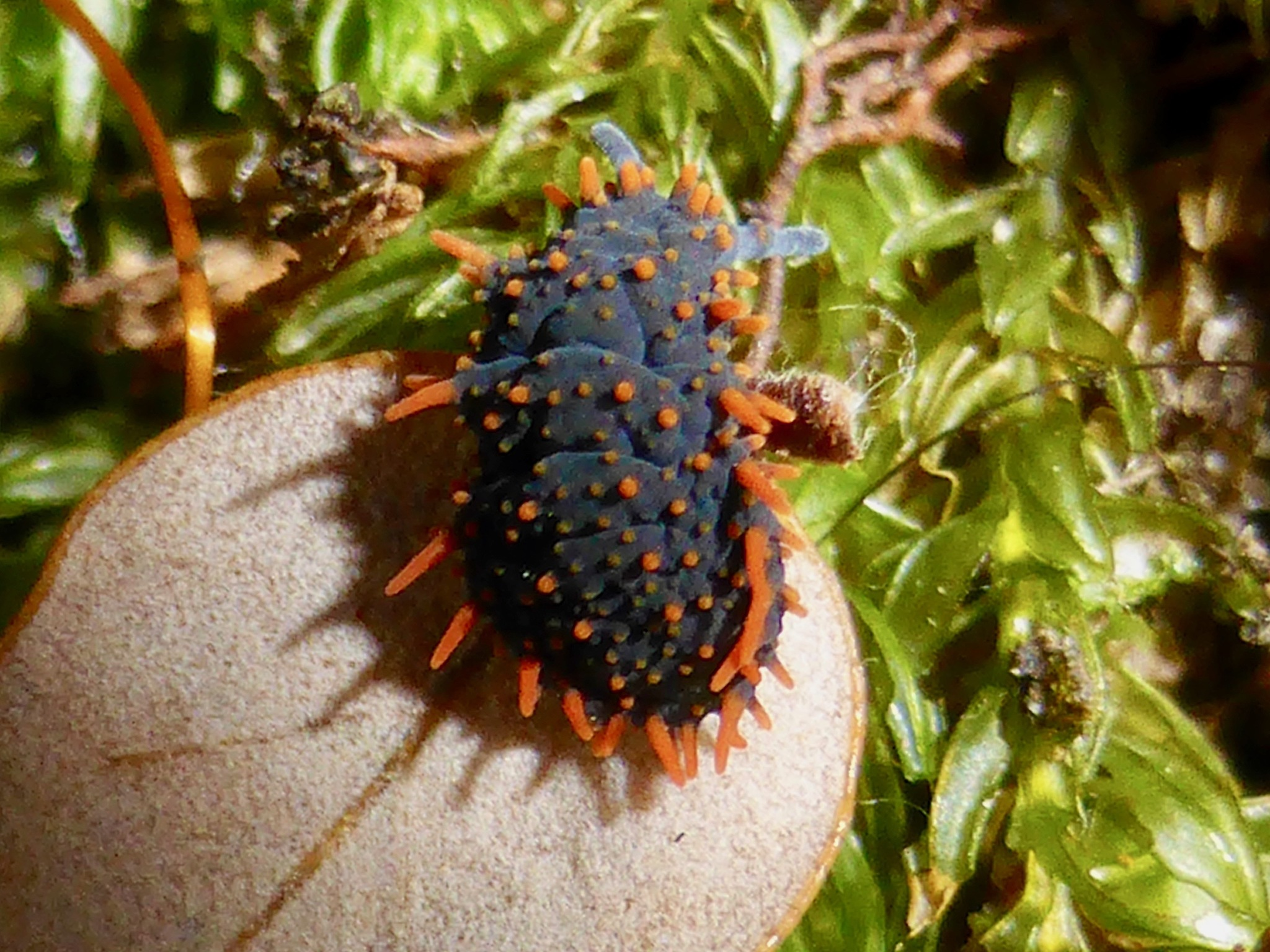
H. paucispinosa

Holacanthella species are usually dark bluish-grey in colour, with distinctive brightly coloured spine-like projections (called digitations) on their skin. The digitations range in colour from dark to white to yellow to red, even within a single species like H. paucispinosa, in which different colour morphs occur side by side and vary geographically.

Most Collembola are only 1–3 mm in length, but Holacanthella average 6–10 mm, and some individuals of H. duospinosa have been recorded as reaching 17 mm, making them the largest known species of springtail. Unlike most springtails, Holacanthella lack a furcula and cannot jump.

Holacanthella came third in the 2025 bug of the year competition held by the Entomological Society of New Zealand.

== Distribution ==
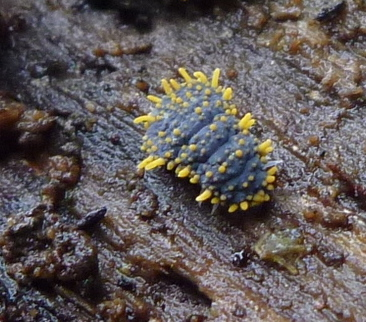
H. paucispinosa, Fraser's Gully, Dunedin, New Zealand

Holacanthella are decomposers, relying on rotting hardwood logs for food. They have been recorded only from indigenous native bush in New Zealand, preferring diverse, mature forest that has never been logged. They appear to be absent from regrown forest, possibly because they are poor at recolonising former habitats; their presence may in fact be an indicator of forest health.

== Species ==
- Holacanthella spinosa (Lubbock, 1899)
- Holacanthella paucispinosa (Salmon, 1941)
- Holacanthella brevispinosa (Salmon, 1942)
- Holacanthella duospinosa (Salmon, 1942)
- Holacanthella laterospinosa (Salmon, 1944)
