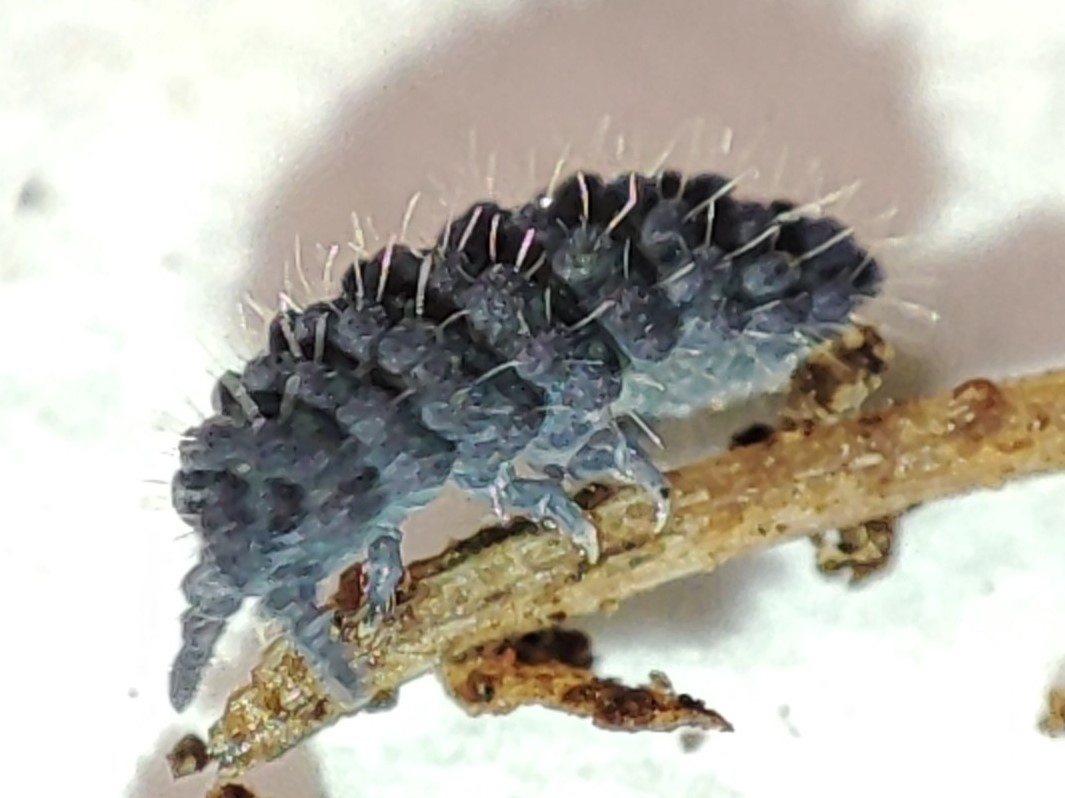
- Morulina verrucosa

Scientific classification
- Domain: Eukaryota
- Kingdom: Animalia
- Phylum: Arthropoda
- Class: Collembola
- Order: Poduromorpha
- Family: Neanuridae
- Subfamily: Morulininae
- Genus: Morulina; Borner, 1906

= Morulina =

Genus of springtails

Morulina is a genus of springtails in the family Neanuridae. There are about 11 described species in the genus Morulina.

== Species ==
These 11 species belong to the genus Morulina:

- Morulina alia Christiansen & Bellinger, 1980
- Morulina callowayia Wray, 1953
- Morulina ceylonica Dall
- Morulina crassa Christiansen & Bellinger, 1980
- Morulina gigantea (Tullberg, 1876)
- Morulina mackenziana Hammer, 1953
- Morulina multatuberculata (Coleman, 1941)
- Morulina nucifera
- Morulina nuda Cassagnau, 1955
- Morulina thulensis Hammer, 1953
- Morulina verrucosa (Borner, 1903)
