= Edoughnura =

Scientific classification
- Domain: Eukaryota
- Kingdom: Animalia
- Phylum: Arthropoda
- Class: Collembola
- Order: Poduromorpha
- Family: Neanuridae
- Genus: Edoughnura; Deharveng, Hamra Kroua & Bedos, 2007

Genus of springtails

Edoughnura is a genus of springtails in the family Neanuridae. There is at least one described species in Edoughnura, E. rara.
