= Friesea =

- Friesea truncata

Scientific classification
- Kingdom: Animalia
- Phylum: Arthropoda
- Clade: Pancrustacea
- Class: Collembola
- Order: Poduromorpha
- Family: Neanuridae
- Subfamily: Frieseinae
- Genus: Friesea; Dalla Torre, 1895

Synonyms
- List: Triaena Tullberg, 1871; Macgillivraya Grote, 1894; Polyacanthella Schäffer, 1897; Achorutoides Willem, 1901; Subantarctica Salmon, JT, 1949; Prospinanura Wray, 1952; Wrayella Salmon, 1956; Neoprospinanura Wray, 1963; Pseudocolonavis Salmon, 1964; Spinanurida Salmon, 1969

Genus of springtails

Friesea is a large genus of springtails belonging to the family Neanuridae.

The genus has a cosmopolitan distribution.

== Species ==
The following species are recognised in the genus Friesea:

- Friesea acuminata (Denis, 1925)
- Friesea aeolica R. Dallai, 1973
- Friesea africana Delamare Deboutteville, C, 1953
- Friesea afurcata (Denis, 1926)
- Friesea alaskella Fjellberg, 1985
- Friesea albicollis (Thibaud & Massoud, 1980)
- Friesea albida Stach, 1949
- Friesea albithorax Massoud & Thibaud, 1981
- Friesea anophthalma Thibaud, J-M & W.M. Weiner, 1997
- Friesea antarctica (Willem, V, 1901)
- Friesea araucana de Izarra, DC, 1972
- Friesea arlei Massoud & Bellinger, 1963
- Friesea arnei Weiner, WM & Najt, J, 1985
- Friesea atypica Cassagnau, 1958
- Friesea australica Greenslade, P & Deharveng, L, 1997
- Friesea baltica Szeptycki, 1964
- Friesea bispinosa Deharveng, 1981
- Friesea bodenheimeri Börner, 1927
- Friesea boitata Queiroz & de Mendonça, 2014
- Friesea bonariensis de Izarra, DC, 1965
- Friesea brevicaudata (Schäffer, 1897)
- Friesea buyuni Gao, Y & Palacios-Vargas, JG, 2010
- Friesea capensis Weiner, WM, Janion-Scheepers, C & Deharveng, L, 2017
- Friesea carlota Christiansen, K & Bellinger, P, 1988
- Friesea cassagnaui J.C. Simón-Benito & Deharveng L, 1997
- Friesea cauchoisi Delamare Deboutteville, 1951
- Friesea cera K. Christiansen & P. Bellinger, 1973
- Friesea chiangdaoensis Deharveng & Bedos, 1991
- Friesea christiani Thibaud, 1995
- Friesea claviseta Axelson, 1900
- Friesea coiffaiti P. Cassagnau & C. Delamare Deboutteville, 1955
- Friesea colorata P. Cassagnau, 1958
- Friesea cretensis Smolis, A, Skarzynski, D & Gwiazdowicz, DJ, 2023
- Friesea cruchagae J.I. Arbea & R. Jordana, 1989
- Friesea cubensis Potapov & Banasko, 1985
- Friesea curupira Queiroz & de Mendonça, 2015
- Friesea daliensis Tamura, H & Yue, Q, 1998
- Friesea danica A. Fjellberg, 1998
- Friesea decemoculata Börner, 1903
- Friesea decipiens Steiner, 1958
- Friesea deharvengi Izarra, 1980
- Friesea denisi Kseneman, 1936
- Friesea duodecimoculata Denis, 1926
- Friesea durandi Thibaud, 2009
- Friesea emucronata Stach, 1922
- Friesea espunaensis J.I. Arbea & R. Jordana, 1993
- Friesea eureka Greenslade, 2018
- Friesea excelsa Denis, J-R, 1936
- Friesea fagei Denis, 1932
- Friesea fantaba Greenslade, 2018
- Friesea fara K. Christiansen & P. Bellinger, 1973
- Friesea filii Palacios-Vargas, JG & Mejía, BE, 1988
- Friesea flava (Salmon, JT, 1949)
- Friesea florifera Greenslade, P & Deharveng, L, 1997
- Friesea furculata Deharveng & Bedos, 1991
- Friesea geminioculata I. Loksa, 1964
- Friesea gigliolii Murphy, 1965
- Friesea gracilispina Deharveng & Bedos, 1991
- Friesea grandis H. B. Mills, 1934
- Friesea gretae Greenslade P & Fanciulli PP, 2020
- Friesea grisea (Schäffer, 1891)
- Friesea guarinoi Giuga & Jordana, 2013
- Friesea haldanei Rapoport & Maño, 1969
- Friesea hammeni Massoud, 1965
- Friesea handschini M. Kseneman, 1938
- Friesea hnaeu W.M. Weiner, Bedos A & Deharveng L, 2009
- Friesea hoffmannorum Palacios-Vargas, JG, 1982
- Friesea incognita Bu Y & Palacios-Vargas JG, 2019
- Friesea inermis (P. Cassagnau, 1958)
- Friesea inthanonensis Deharveng & Bedos, 1991
- Friesea isabelae J.I. Arbea & R. Jordana, 1993
- Friesea jaliscoensis J.G. Palacios-Vargas & B.E. Mejía, 1988
- Friesea japonica Yosii, 1954
- Friesea jeanneli Denis, 1947
- Friesea josei Palacios-Vargas, JG, 1986
- Friesea judithae J.G. Palacios-Vargas, 1986
- Friesea jugoslavica da Gama, 1963
- Friesea jurubatiba T.C. da Silveira & M.C. de Mendonça, 2018
- Friesea kanchanaburiensis Deharveng & Bedos, 1991
- Friesea kardosia (Wray, 1952)
- Friesea kariae A. Smolis, 2010
- Friesea kymgangsani Weiner, WM & Najt, J, 1985
- Friesea ladeiroi da Gama, 1959
- Friesea lagrecai R. Dallai, 1973
- Friesea landwehri K. Christiansen & P. Bellinger, 1980
- Friesea laouina Deharveng, L & Hamra-Kroua, S, 2004
- Friesea laszloi J.G. Palacios-Vargas & G. Traser, 1997
- Friesea leei Thibaud & Kim, 1995
- Friesea lijiangensis Tamura, H & Yue, Q, 1998
- Friesea lisu Deharveng & Bedos, 1991
- Friesea litoralis Wise, 1964
- Friesea lobulata Palacios-Vargas & Díaz A, 1986
- Friesea loicmatilei Weiner & Najt, 2001
- Friesea macuilimitl Palacios-Vargas, 1986
- Friesea magnicornis Denis, 1931
- Friesea mahajanga Thibaud, 2008
- Friesea major S. Hamra-Kroua, R. Jordana & L. Deharveng, 2009
- Friesea malvinensis Najt & Rubio, 1979
- Friesea mandibulata (Salmon, 1969)
- Friesea marianoius Palacios-Vargas, JG, 2005
- Friesea maritima da Gama, 1964
- Friesea massoudi Rusek, 1973
- Friesea mauriesi P. Cassagnau, 1958
- Friesea maxima Baijal, 1957
- Friesea microphthalma Deharveng & Bedos, 1991
- Friesea millsi Christiansen & Bellinger, 1973
- Friesea mirabilis (Tullberg, 1871)
- Friesea mirceai Fiera, C & Weiner, WM, 2016
- Friesea mistralae Rapoport, EH & Rubio, IR, 1963
- Friesea monoculata Dunger, 1972
- Friesea montana P. Cassagnau, 1958
- Friesea montechristii Dallai, 1969
- Friesea monteiroi Rapoport, 1962
- Friesea mucumontana Palacios-Vargas, JG & Díaz, A, 1986
- Friesea multiclavata da Rocha Neves, AC, de Mendonça, MC & Queiroz, GC, 2019
- Friesea multispinosa Denis, 1947
- Friesea najtae D'Haese, CA, Stevens, MI & Weiner, WM, 2017
- Friesea nauimetztli Palacios-Vargas, JG & Acosta VV, 1994
- Friesea neocaledonica J.G. Palacios-Vargas, 1988
- Friesea neptunia Greenslade, P & Deharveng, L, 1997
- Friesea nigrimontana P. Cassagnau, 1964
- Friesea nigrissima (Salmon, 1954)
- Friesea nigroviolacea Enderlein, 1909
- Friesea ninau K. Christiansen & P. Bellinger, 1992
- Friesea normae Weiner, WM & Najt, J, 1985
- Friesea octooculata Stach, 1949
- Friesea oleia K. Christiansen & P. Bellinger, 1992
- Friesea oligorhopala Caroli, 1914
- Friesea onphoriensis Weiner, WM & Najt, J, 1985
- Friesea ortunoi Jordana R & Baquero E, 2020
- Friesea oshoro Uchida & Tamura, 1966
- Friesea oteruelensis Simón-Benito, JC, 2005
- Friesea oxfordi (Wray, 1953)
- Friesea pacifica (Yosii, R, 1958)
- Friesea paitooni Deharveng & Bedos, 1991
- Friesea palaciosi Deharveng & Bedos, 1991
- Friesea palafoxaliciae Palacios-Vargas, JG, 2005
- Friesea parva (Womersley, H, 1936)
- Friesea pati Fjellberg, A, 1984
- Friesea paula Yosii, 1966
- Friesea pentacantha H.B. Mills, 1934
- Friesea peruensis Smolis, A & Skarzynski, D, 2006
- Friesea petiti (Delamare Deboutteville, C & Massoud, Z, 1964)
- Friesea pins Thibaud, J-M & W.M. Weiner, 1997
- Friesea polla Christiansen & Bellinger, 1973
- Friesea posada Fiera, C & Weiner, WM, 2016
- Friesea propria Greenslade P & Fanciulli PP, 2020
- Friesea psuedodecipiens J.I. Arbea & R. Jordana, 1997
- Friesea pyrenaica Cassagnau, 1958
- Friesea quadriocellata Izarra, 1980
- Friesea quadrispina (Cassagnau & Rapoport, 1962)
- Friesea quadrispinensis Gao, Y, Yin & WY, 2005
- Friesea quinquespinosa (Wahlgren, 1900)
- Friesea quinta Christiansen & Bellinger, 1973
- Friesea reducta Denis, 1931
- Friesea rothi Christiansen & Bellinger, 1988
- Friesea rubeni Deharveng & Bedos, 1991
- Friesea salmoni Massoud, Z, 1967
- Friesea salti (Salmon, 1954)
- Friesea sandzuensis Weiner, WM & Najt, J, 1985
- Friesea santo Weiner, WM, Bedos A & Deharveng L, 2009
- Friesea schulzi Smolis, A, Skarzynski, D & Gwiazdowicz, DJ, 2023
- Friesea sensillata Palacios-Vargas & Díaz A, 1986
- Friesea septem Weiner, WM, Bedos A & Deharveng L, 2009
- Friesea sexoculata P. Cassagnau, 1958
- Friesea shaanxiensis Gao, Y, Yin & WY, 2005
- Friesea simoni J.I. Arbea & R. Jordana, 1993
- Friesea sphaerulaphora Barra, 1970
- Friesea stachi Kseneman, 1936
- Friesea stampa Fiera, C & Weiner, WM, 2016
- Friesea steineri Simón, 1973
- Friesea stepposa Tshelnokov, 1990
- Friesea stevenchowni Weiner, WM, Janion-Scheepers, C & Deharveng, L, 2017
- Friesea sublimis Macnamara, 1921
- Friesea subterranea Cassagnau, 1958
- Friesea tatrica Nosek, 1965
- Friesea tepetlana Palacios-Vargas, 1986
- Friesea tibiotarsalis Deharveng & Bedos, 1991
- Friesea tilbrooki Wise, KAJ, 1970
- Friesea topo Greenslade, P, 1995
- Friesea tourrantensis Cassagnau, 1958
- Friesea travei Deharveng, 1981
- Friesea truncata Cassagnau, 1958
- Friesea truncatopilosa Rusek, 1971
- Friesea tzontli Palacios-Vargas & Vidal-Acosta, 1994
- Friesea valerieae Thibaud, 1993
- Friesea versabilis Barra, J-A, 1995
- Friesea villanuevai Arbea & Jordana, 1991
- Friesea voisini Deharveng, 1981
- Friesea vtorovi Tshelnokov, 1977
- Friesea wabao Weiner, Bedos & Deharveng, 2009
- Friesea wilkeyi Christiansen & Bellinger, 1974
- Friesea woyciechowskii Weiner, 1980
- Friesea xitlensis Palacios-Vargas & Vidal-Acosta, 1994
- Friesea yosii Prabhoo, 1971
- Friesea yupanquii Izarra, 1973
- BOLD:AAB7291 (Friesea sp.)
- BOLD:AAB7293 (Friesea sp.)
- BOLD:AAI2335 (Friesea sp.)
- BOLD:ABW8994 (Friesea sp.)
- BOLD:ACZ1573 (Friesea sp.)
- BOLD:ADC7552 (Friesea sp.)
- BOLD:ADF3744 (Friesea sp.)
- BOLD:AEL0357 (Friesea sp.)
- BOLD:AEL0358 (Friesea sp.)
