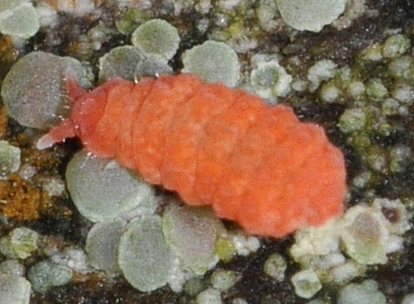
- Bilobella braunerae

Scientific classification
- Kingdom: Animalia
- Phylum: Arthropoda
- Clade: Pancrustacea
- Class: Collembola
- Order: Poduromorpha
- Family: Neanuridae
- Tribe: Paleonurini
- Genus: Bilobella; Caroli, 1912

= Bilobella =

Genus of springtails

Bilobella is a genus of springtails in the family Neanuridae. There are about 13 described species in Bilobella.

== Species ==
These 13 species belong to the genus Bilobella:

- Bilobella albanica Cassagnau & Peja, 1979^{g}
- Bilobella aurantiaca^{b}
- Bilobella braunerae Deharveng, 1981^{g}
- Bilobella coiffaiti Cassagnau, 1968^{g}
- Bilobella digitata Cassagnau, 1968^{g}
- Bilobella excolorata Loksa & Rubio, 1966^{g}
- Bilobella ligurica Deharveng, 1981^{g}
- Bilobella mahunkai^{g}
- Bilobella massoudi Cassagnau, 1968^{g}
- Bilobella matsakisi Cassagnau, 1968^{g}
- Bilobella proxima Cassagnau & Peja, 1979^{g}
- Bilobella subaurantiaca Cassagnau & Peja, 1979^{g}
- Bilobella zekoi Cassagnau & Peja, 1979^{g}

Data sources: i = ITIS, c = Catalogue of Life, g = GBIF, b = Bugguide.net
