= Micranurida =

Scientific classification
- Kingdom: Animalia
- Phylum: Arthropoda
- Class: Collembola
- Order: Poduromorpha
- Family: Neanuridae
- Genus: Micranurida; Börner, 1901

Genus of arthropods

Micranurida is a genus of arthropods belonging to the family Neanuridae.

The species of this genus are found in Europe and Northern America.

Species:

- Micranurida agenjoi Simon, 1979
- Micranurida anophthalmica Stach, 1949
