= Pseudachorutes =

- Holotype of Pseudachorutes puniceus

Scientific classification
- Kingdom: Animalia
- Phylum: Arthropoda
- Clade: Pancrustacea
- Class: Collembola
- Order: Poduromorpha
- Family: Neanuridae
- Subfamily: Pseudachorutinae
- Genus: Pseudachorutes; Tullberg, 1871

Synonyms
- Brachysius MacGillivray, 1893; Gnathocephalus MacGillivray, 1893; Logacanura Wray, 1958

Genus of springtails

Pseudachorutes is a genus of springtails in the family Neanuridae. There are more than 50 described species in Pseudachorutes.

== Species ==
These 53 species belong to the genus Pseudachorutes:

- Pseudachorutes americanus Stach, 1949
- Pseudachorutes aphysus Christiansen & Bellinger, 1980
- Pseudachorutes aureofasciatus (Harvey, 1898)
- Pseudachorutes beta Najt & Weiner, 1991
- Pseudachorutes bifidus Christiansen & Bellinger, 1980
- Pseudachorutes bobeitio Najt & Weiner, 1997
- Pseudachorutes boerneri Schött, 1902
- Pseudachorutes chazeaui Najt & Weiner, 1991
- Pseudachorutes cheni
- Pseudachorutes complexus (Macgillivray, 1893)
- Pseudachorutes corticicolus (Schaeffer, 1896)
- Pseudachorutes crassus da Gama, 1964
- Pseudachorutes curtus Christiansen & Bellinger, 1980
- Pseudachorutes deficiens
- Pseudachorutes dubius Krausbauer, 1898
- Pseudachorutes geronensis (Massoud, 1963)
- Pseudachorutes ignotus Christiansen & Bellinger, 1980
- Pseudachorutes indiana Christiansen & Bellinger, 1980
- Pseudachorutes janstachi
- Pseudachorutes labiatus
- Pseudachorutes laricis Arbea & Jordana, 1989
- Pseudachorutes legrisi Thibaud & Massoud, 1983
- Pseudachorutes libanensis (Cassagnau & Delamare, 1955)
- Pseudachorutes longisetis Yosii, 1961
- Pseudachorutes lunata Folsom, 1916
- Pseudachorutes medjugorjensis Barra, 1993
- Pseudachorutes minor Peja, 1985
- Pseudachorutes nica Palacios-Vargas & Mejía-Madrid, 2012
- Pseudachorutes octosensillatus
- Pseudachorutes ouatilouensis Najt & Weiner, 1997
- Pseudachorutes pachyrostris Becker, 1948
- Pseudachorutes palmiensis Börner, 1903
- Pseudachorutes parvulus Börner, 1901
- Pseudachorutes plurichaetosus Arbea & Jordana, 1991
- Pseudachorutes poahi Christiansen & Bellinger, 1992
- Pseudachorutes polychaetosus
- Pseudachorutes pratensis Rusek, 1973
- Pseudachorutes reductus Thibaud & Massoud, 1983
- Pseudachorutes romeroi Simon, 1985
- Pseudachorutes rugatus Wray, 1952
- Pseudachorutes saxatilis Macnamara, 1920
- Pseudachorutes scythicus
- Pseudachorutes simplex Maynard, 1951
- Pseudachorutes subabdominalis Steiner, 1958
- Pseudachorutes subcrassoides Mills, 1934
- Pseudachorutes subcrassus Tullberg, 1871
- Pseudachorutes tamajonensis Simon, 1985
- Pseudachorutes tavignani Poinsot-Balaguer, 1978
- Pseudachorutes texensis Christiansen & Bellinger, 1980
- Pseudachorutes tillieri Najt & Weiner, 1991
- Pseudachorutes vasylii
- Pseudachorutes vitalii
- Pseudachorutes yoshii Najt & Weiner, 1991
