= Endonura =

Scientific classification
- Kingdom: Animalia
- Phylum: Arthropoda
- Class: Collembola
- Order: Poduromorpha
- Family: Neanuridae
- Genus: Endonura; Cassagnau, 1979

Genus of springtails

Endonura is a genus of springtails in the family Neanuridae. There are at least 40 described species in Endonura.

== Species ==
These 41 species belong to the genus Endonura:

- Endonura alavensis Pozo & Simon, 1981^{g}
- Endonura arbasensis Deharveng, 1979^{g}
- Endonura asiatica^{g}
- Endonura baculifer Deharveng, 1979^{g}
- Endonura caeca Gisin, 1963^{g}
- Endonura cantabrica Deharveng, 1979^{g}
- Endonura centaurea Cassagnau & Peja, 1979^{g}
- Endonura ceratolabralis Cassagnau, 1979^{g}
- Endonura colorata (da Gama, 1964)^{g}
- Endonura cretensis (Ellis, 1976)^{g}
- Endonura dalensi Deharveng, 1979^{g}
- Endonura deharvengi Cassagnau & Peja, 1979^{g}
- Endonura dentifera^{g}
- Endonura dichaeta Cassagnau, 1979^{g}
- Endonura dudichi Loksa, 1967^{g}
- Endonura gladiolifer (Cassagnau, 1954)^{g}
- Endonura gracilirostris^{g}
- Endonura granulata (Cassagnau & Delamare, 1955)^{g}
- Endonura ichnusae Dallai, 1983^{g}
- Endonura immaculata Deharveng, 1980^{g}
- Endonura incolorata Stach, 1951^{g}
- Endonura levantica^{g}
- Endonura longirostris Cassagnau, 1979^{g}
- Endonura ludovicae (Denis, 1948)^{g}
- Endonura lusatica (Dunger, 1966)^{g}
- Endonura occidentalis Deharveng, 1979^{g}
- Endonura paracentaurea Cassagnau, 1979^{g}
- Endonura pejai Deharveng, 1980^{g}
- Endonura persica Cassagnau, 1979^{g}
- Endonura poinsotae Deharveng, 1980^{g}
- Endonura portucalensis (da Gama, 1964)^{g}
- Endonura quadriseta Cassagnau & Peja, 1979^{g}
- Endonura saleri^{g}
- Endonura szeptyckii (Weiner, 1973)^{g}
- Endonura tartaginensis Deharveng, 1980^{g}
- Endonura tatricola (Stach, 1951)^{g}
- Endonura taurica (Stach, 1951)^{g}
- Endonura tetrophthalma (Stach, 1929)^{g}
- Endonura turkmenica Cassagnau, 1979^{g}
- Endonura tyrrhenica Dallai, 1983^{g}
- Endonura urotuberculata Pomorski & Skarzinski, 2000^{g}

Data sources: i = ITIS, c = Catalogue of Life, g = GBIF, b = Bugguide.net
