= Odontella (springtail) =

Scientific classification
- Kingdom: Animalia
- Phylum: Arthropoda
- Class: Collembola
- Order: Poduromorpha
- Family: Odontellidae
- Genus: Odontella; Schäffer, 1897

Genus of springtails

Odontella is a genus of springtails in the family Odontellidae. There are about 13 described species in Odontella.

== Species ==
These 13 species belong to the genus Odontella:

- Odontella armata (Axelson, 1903)^{i c g}
- Odontella biloba Christiansen and Bellinger, 1980^{i c g}
- Odontella clavata Christiansen and Bellinger, 1980^{i c g}
- Odontella cornifer Mills, 1934^{i c g b}
- Odontella ewingi Folsom, 1916^{i c g}
- Odontella kapii Christiansen & Bellinger, 1992^{i c g}
- Odontella loricata Schaeffer, 1897^{i c g}
- Odontella novacaledonica Najt & Weiner, 1997^{g}
- Odontella rossi Christiansen and Bellinger, 1980^{i c g}
- Odontella shasta Christiansen and Bellinger, 1980^{i c g}
- Odontella stella Christiansen and Bellinger, 1980^{i c g}
- Odontella substriata Wray, 1952^{i c g}
- Odontella uka Christiansen & Bellinger, 1992^{i c g}

Data sources: i = ITIS, c = Catalogue of Life, g = GBIF, b = Bugguide.net
