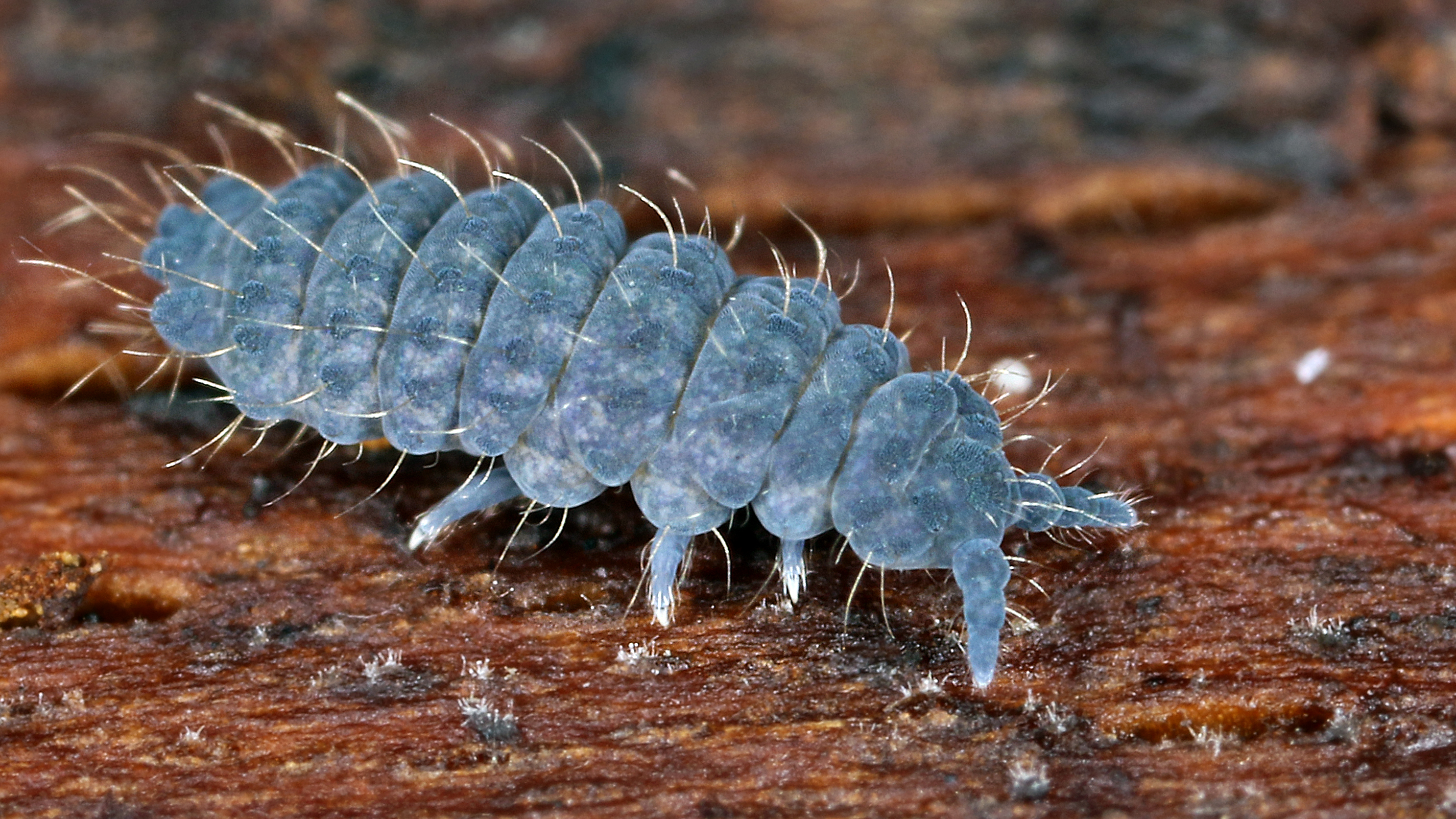
- Deutonura conjuncta

Scientific classification
- Kingdom: Animalia
- Phylum: Arthropoda
- Class: Collembola
- Order: Poduromorpha
- Family: Neanuridae
- Genus: Deutonura; Cassagnau, 1979

= Deutonura =

Genus of springtails

Deutonura is a genus of springtails in the family Neanuridae. There are at least 40 described species in Deutonura.

== Species ==
These 44 species belong to the genus Deutonura:

- Deutonura albella (Stach, 1920)^{g}
- Deutonura anophthalma (Massoud & Thibaud, 1968)^{g}
- Deutonura arbeai Lucianez & Simon, 1995^{g}
- Deutonura atlantica Deharveng, 1982^{g}
- Deutonura balsainensis Simon Benito, 1978^{g}
- Deutonura benzi Traser, Thibaud & Najt, 1993^{g}
- Deutonura betica Deharveng, 1979^{g}
- Deutonura caerulescens Deharveng, 1982^{g}
- Deutonura caprai Dallai, 1983^{g}
- Deutonura carinthiaca Deharveng, 1982^{g}
- Deutonura centralis (da Gama, 1964)^{g}
- Deutonura coiffaiti Deharveng, 1979^{g}
- Deutonura conjuncta (Stach, 1926)^{g}
- Deutonura corsica (Denis, 1947)^{g}
- Deutonura czarnohorensis Deharveng, 1982^{g}
- Deutonura decolorata (da Gama & Gisin, 1964)^{g}
- Deutonura deficiens Deharveng, 1979^{g}
- Deutonura deharvengi Arbea & Jordana, 1991^{g}
- Deutonura dextra Gisin, 1954^{g}
- Deutonura gibbosa Porco, Bedos & Deharveng, 2010^{g}
- Deutonura gisini Deharveng, 1982^{g}
- Deutonura ibicensis (Ellis, 1974)^{g}
- Deutonura igilica Dallai, 1983^{g}
- Deutonura ilvatica Dallai, 1983^{g}
- Deutonura inopinata Deharveng, 1979^{g}
- Deutonura insularis Deharveng, 1982^{g}
- Deutonura jeromoltoi Deharveng, Bedos & Duran, 2015^{g}
- Deutonura luberonensis Deharveng, 1982^{g}
- Deutonura mirabilis Deharveng, 1987^{g}
- Deutonura monticola (Cassagnau, 1954)^{g}
- Deutonura oglasicola Dallai, 1983^{g}
- Deutonura phlegraea (Caroli, 1912)^{g}
- Deutonura plena (Stach, 1951)^{g}
- Deutonura provincialis Deharveng, 1979^{g}
- Deutonura quinquesetosa Deharveng, 1982^{g}
- Deutonura selgae Deharveng, 1979^{g}
- Deutonura similis Deharveng, 1979^{g}
- Deutonura sinistra (Denis, 1935)^{g}
- Deutonura stachi (Gisin, 1952)^{g}
- Deutonura sylviae Dallai, 1983^{g}
- Deutonura urbionensis Deharveng, 1979^{g}
- Deutonura vallespirensis Deharveng, 1982^{g}
- Deutonura weinerae Deharveng, 1982^{g}
- Deutonura zana^{g}

Data sources: i = ITIS, c = Catalogue of Life, g = GBIF, b = Bugguide.net
