= Protanura =

Scientific classification
- Domain: Eukaryota
- Kingdom: Animalia
- Phylum: Arthropoda
- Class: Collembola
- Order: Poduromorpha
- Family: Neanuridae
- Genus: Protanura; Borner, 1906

Genus of springtails

Protanura is a genus of springtails in the family Neanuridae. There are about six described species in Protanura.

== Species ==
These six species belong to the genus Protanura:

- Protanura lutea Cassagnau & Peja, 1979^{g}
- Protanura mediterranea Stach, 1967^{g}
- Protanura monticellii Caroli, 1910^{g}
- Protanura papillata Cassagnau & Delamare Deboutteville, 1955^{g}
- Protanura pseudomuscorum (Börner, 1903)^{g}
- Protanura quadrioculata (Borner, 1901)^{g}

Data sources: i = ITIS, c = Catalogue of Life, g = GBIF, b = Bugguide.net
