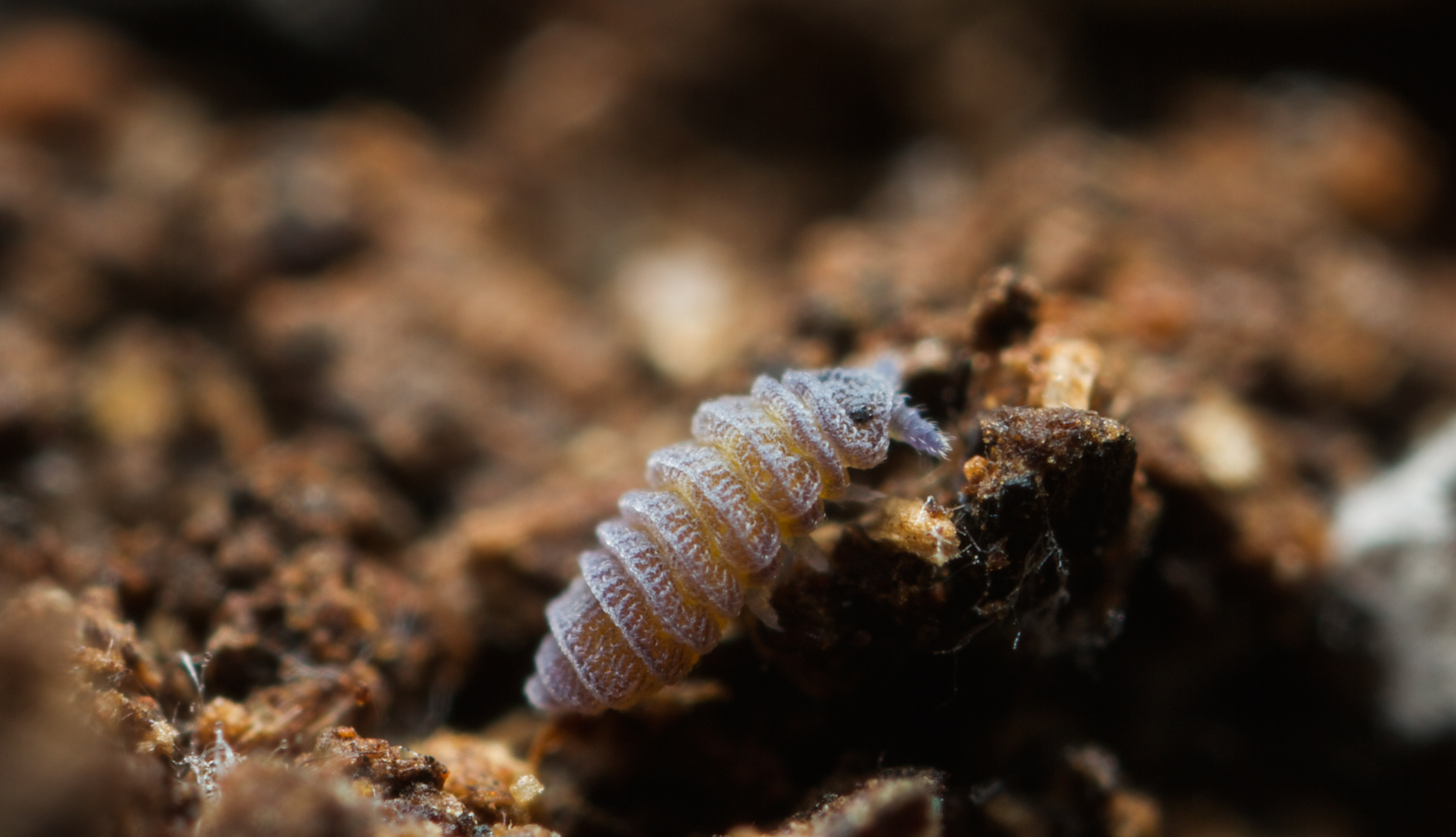

Scientific classification
- Domain: Eukaryota
- Kingdom: Animalia
- Phylum: Arthropoda
- Class: Collembola
- Order: Poduromorpha
- Superfamily: Neanuroidea
- Family: Odontellidae

= Odontellidae =

Family of springtails

Odontellidae is a family of springtails in the order Poduromorpha. There are about 9 genera and more than 50 described species in Odontellidae.

== Genera ==
These nine genera belong to the family Odontellidae:

- Austrodontella Ellis & Bellinger, 1973
- Axenyllodes Stach, 1949
- Odontella Schäffer, 1897
- Odontellina Deharveng, 1981
- Pseudostachia Arlé, 1968
- Pseudoxenyllodes Kuznetsova & Potapov, 1988
- Stachia Folsom, 1932
- Superodontella
- Xenyllodes Axelson, 1903
