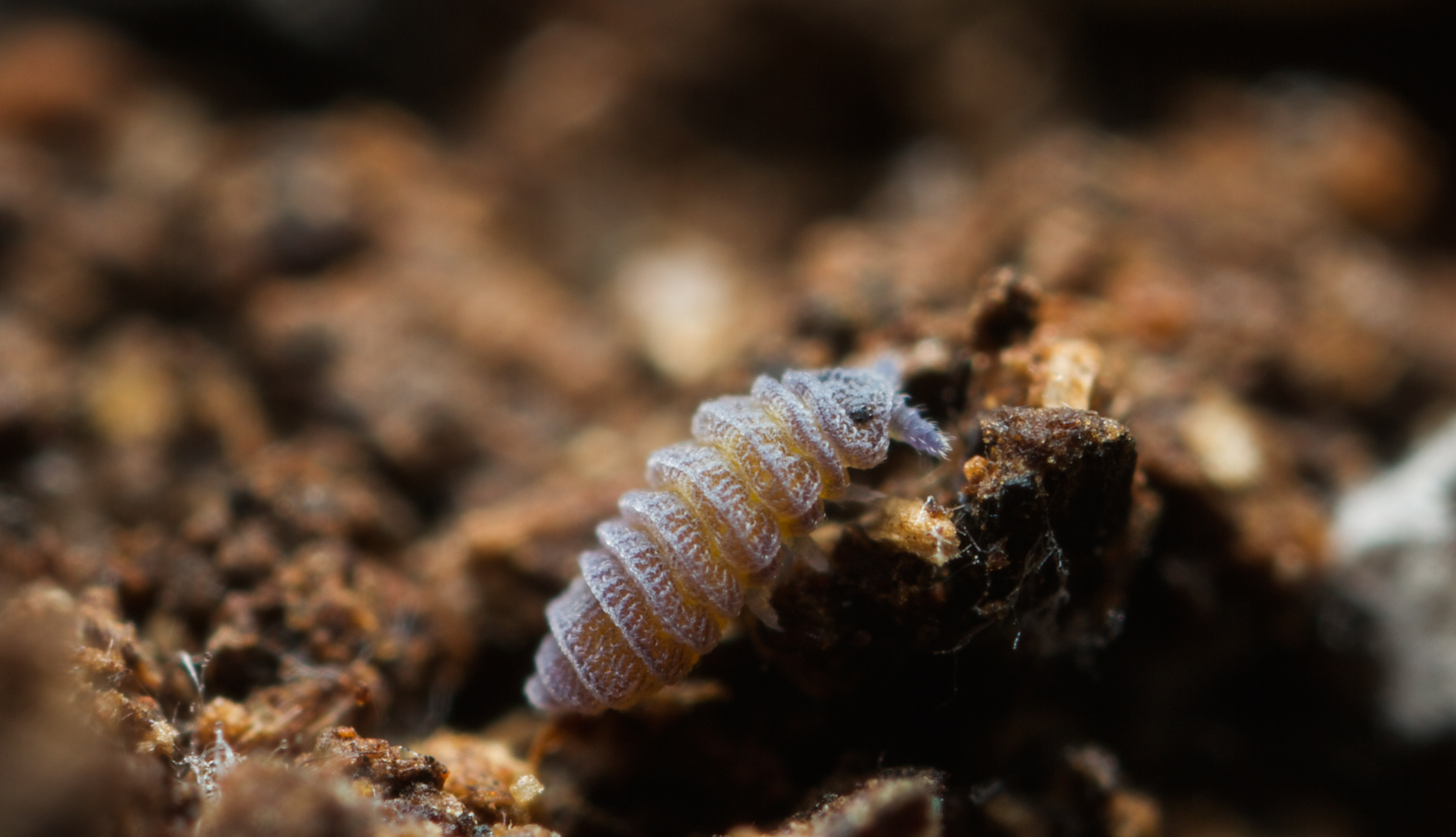
- Odontellidae

Scientific classification
- Domain: Eukaryota
- Kingdom: Animalia
- Phylum: Arthropoda
- Class: Collembola
- Order: Poduromorpha
- Superfamily: Neanuroidea

= Neanuroidea =

Superfamily of springtails

Neanuroidea is a superfamily of springtails in the order Poduromorpha. There are at least 3 families and more than 730 described species in Neanuroidea.

== Families ==
These three families belong to the superfamily Neanuroidea:

- Brachystomellidae
- Neanuridae
- Odontellidae
