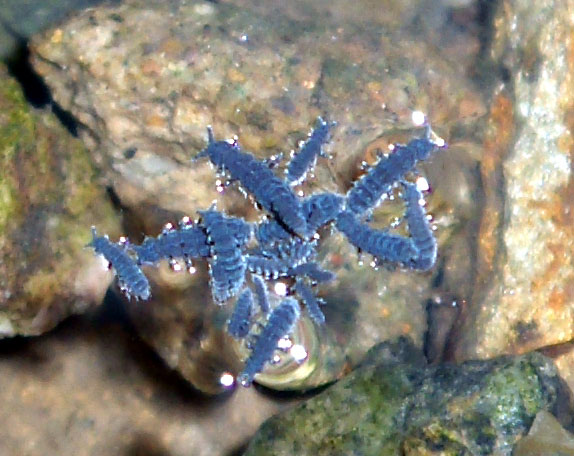
- Anurida maritima (Pseudachorutinae)

Scientific classification
- Kingdom: Animalia
- Phylum: Arthropoda
- Clade: Pancrustacea
- Class: Collembola
- Order: Poduromorpha
- Superfamily: Neanuroidea
- Family: Neanuridae; Börner, 1901

Subfamilies
- 6, see text

= Neanuridae =

Family of springtails

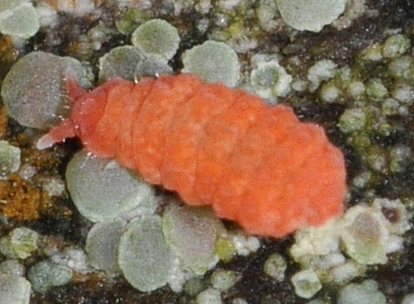
Bilobella braunerae

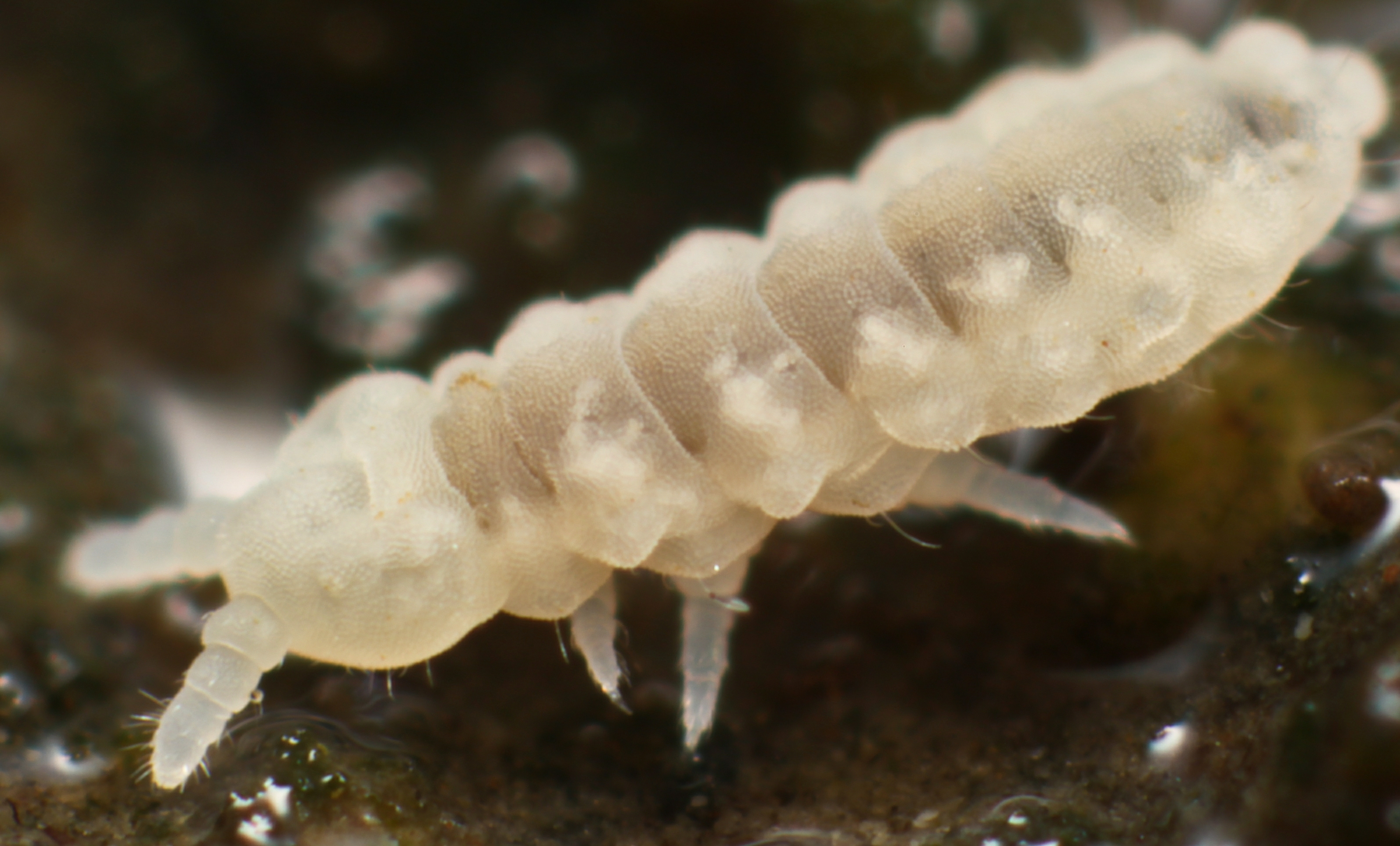
Anurida granaria

The family Neanuridae contains pudgy short-legged springtails of the order Poduromorpha. It was established by Carl Börner in 1901.

== Systematics ==
There are six subfamilies currently recognized:

- Caputanurininae
- Frieseinae
- Morulininae
- Neanurinae
- Pseudachorutinae
- Uchidanurinae

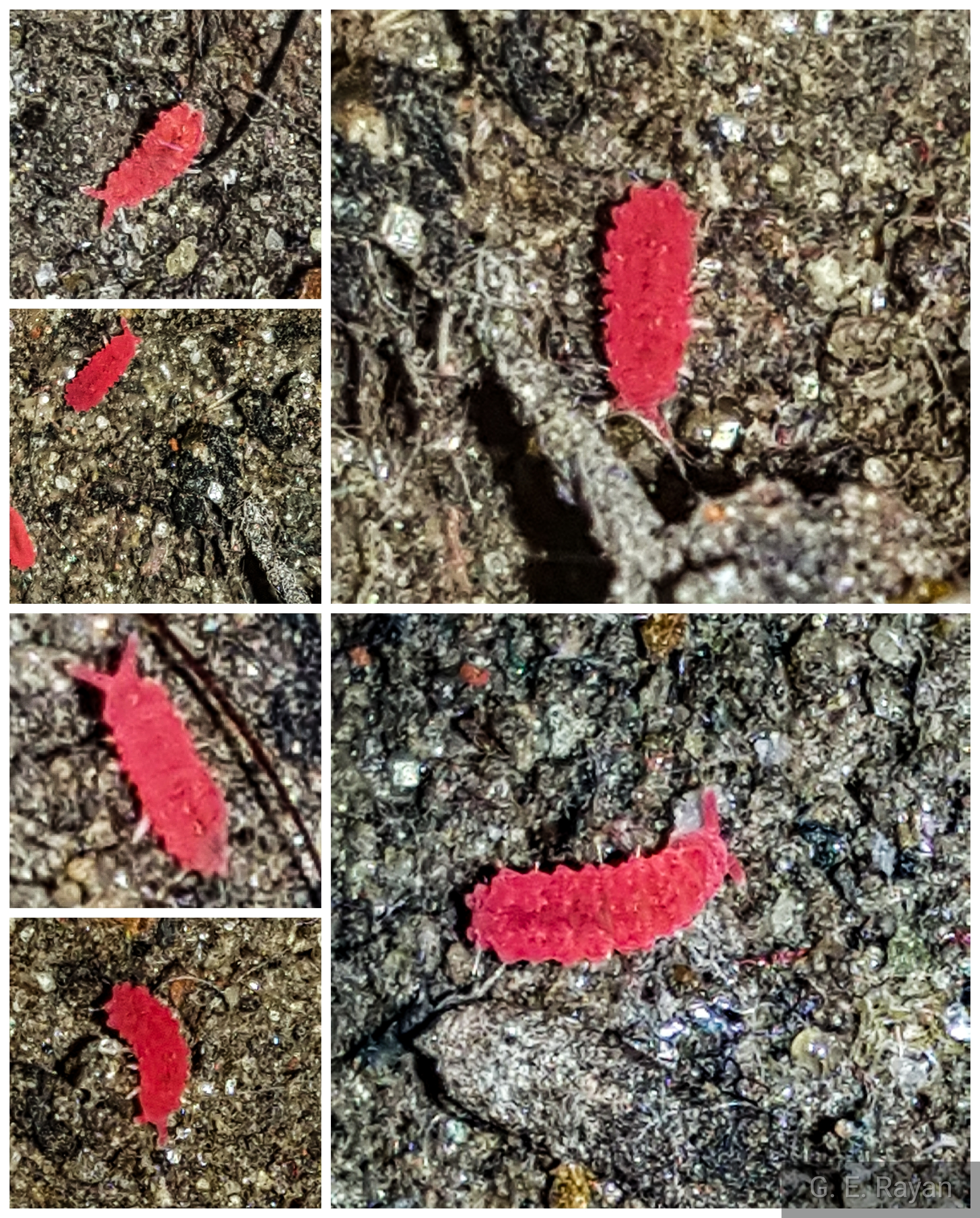
Red Poduromorph Springtails (subfamily Neanurinae) found crawling, rather than jumping, on damp garden soil in Dhaka, Bangladesh.

The peculiar genus Pseudoxenylla is of uncertain relationships and hence not assigned to a subfamily yet.

== Genera ==
These 97 genera belong to the family Neanuridae:

- Adbiloba Stach, 1951^{g}
- Aethiopella Handschin, 1942^{i c g}
- Aethiopellina Delamare, 1951^{g}
- Albanura Deharveng, 1982^{g}
- Americanura Cassagnau, 1983^{g}
- Anurida Laboulbene, 1865^{i c g b}
- Anuridella Willem, 1906^{i c g}
- Arlesia Handschin, 1942^{g}
- Australonura^{c g}
- Balkanura Cassagnau, 1978^{g}
- Bilobella Caroli, 1912^{g b}
- Blasconura Cassagnau, 1983^{g}
- Blasconurella^{g}
- Caledonimeria Delamare-Deboutteville & Massoud, 1962^{g}
- Caledonura Deharveng, 1988^{g}
- Cansilianura Dallai & Fanciulli, 1983^{g}
- Caputanurina Lee, 1983^{g}
- Cassagnaudina Massoud, 1967^{g}
- Catalanura Deharveng, 1982^{g}
- Cephalachorutes Bedos & Deharveng, 1991^{g}
- Ceratrimeria^{c g}
- Chirolavia^{g}
- Crossodonthina^{c g}
- Cryptonura Cassagnau, 1979^{g}
- Delamarellina^{c g}
- Denisimeria Massoud, 1964^{g}
- Deutonura Cassagnau, 1979^{g}
- Digitanura Deharveng, 1987^{g}
- Echinanura Carpenter, 1935^{g}
- Ectonura Cassagnau, 1980^{g}
- Edoughnura Deharveng, Hamra Kroua & Bedos, 2007^{g}
- Endonura Cassagnau, 1979^{g}
- Forsteramea^{c g}
- Friesea Dalla Torre, 1895^{i c g}
- Furculanurida Massoud, 1967^{g}
- Galanura Smolis, 2000^{g}
- Gamachorutes Cassagnau, 1978^{g}
- Gastranurida Bagnall, 1949^{g}
- Gisinea Massoud, 1965^{g}
- Gnatholonche^{c g}
- Hemilobella^{c g}
- Holacanthella^{c g}
- Honduranura^{g}
- Hylaeanura Arlé, 1966^{g}
- Imparitubercula Stach, 1951^{g}
- Israelimeria Weiner & Kaprus, 2005^{g}
- Itanura^{g}
- Lanzhotia Rusek, 1985^{g}
- Lathriopyga Caroli, 1910^{g}
- Lipura Burmeister, 1838^{g}
- Lobella (Neanura) ornata Folsom^{g b}
- Lobellina Yosii, 1956^{g}
- Meganurida Carpenter, 1935^{g}
- Micranurida Börner, 1901^{g}
- Minotaurella Weiner, 1999^{g}
- Monobella Cassagnau, 1979^{g}
- Morulina Borner, 1906^{i c g b}
- Morulodes^{b}
- Neanura MacGillivray, 1893^{i c g b}
- Neanurella Cassagnau, 1968^{g}
- Neotropiella Handschin, 1942^{g}
- Oudemansia Schött, 1893^{i c g}
- Paleonura^{c g}
- Paralobella Cassagnau & Deharveng, 1984^{g}
- Paranura Axelson, 1902^{i c g}
- Paravietnura A.Smolis & N.Kuznetsova, 2018^{c g}
- Parectonura Deharveng, 1988^{g}
- Persanura^{g}
- Philotella Najt & Weiner, 1985^{g}
- Platanurida^{c g}
- Pongeia Najt & Weiner, 2002^{g}
- Pratanurida Rusek, 1973^{g}
- Pronura Delamare-Deboutteville, 1953^{g}
- Protachorutes Cassagnau, 1955^{g}
- Protanura Borner, 1906^{g}
- Protodontella Christiansen & Nascimbene, 2006^{g}
- Pseudachorudina^{c g}
- Pseudachorutella Stach, 1949^{g}
- Pseudachorutes Tullberg, 1871^{i c g b}
- Pseudanurida Schött, 1901^{g}
- Pseudoxenylla Christiansen & Pike, 2002^{g}
- Pumilinura Cassagnau, 1978^{g}
- Quatacanthella^{c g}
- Rapoportella Ellis & Bellinger, 1973^{g}
- Rusekella Deharveng, 1982^{g}
- Sensillanura Deharveng, 1981^{g b}
- Siamanura Deharveng, 1987^{g}
- Simonachorutes^{g}
- Stachorutes Dallai, 1973^{g}
- Tabasconura^{g}
- Telobella Cassagnau, 1983^{g}
- Thaumanura Börner, 1932^{g}
- Tremoisea Cassagnau, 1973^{g}
- Vitronura Yosii, 1969^{g b}
- Yuukianura Yosii, 1955^{g}
- Zealandmeria^{c g}
- Zelandanura^{c g}

Data sources: i = ITIS, c = Catalogue of Life, g = GBIF, b = Bugguide.net
