= List of Ceratophysella species =

This is a list of 104 species in the springtail genus Ceratophysella.

== Ceratophysella species ==
- Ceratophysella adexilis Stach, 1964
- Ceratophysella ainu Yosii, 1972
- Ceratophysella annae (Babenko in Babenko, Chernova, Potapov & Stebaeva, 1994)
- Ceratophysella armata (Nicolet, 1842)
- Ceratophysella ateruii Tamura, 2001
- Ceratophysella bengtssoni (Ågren, 1904)
- Ceratophysella biclavata Park & Park, 2006
- Ceratophysella biloba (Christiansen & Bellinger, 1980)
- Ceratophysella bispinata Loksa, 1977
- Ceratophysella boletivora (Packard, 1873)
- Ceratophysella borealis Martynova, 1977
- Ceratophysella brevis (Christiansen & Bellinger, 1980)
- Ceratophysella brevisensillata Yosii, 1961
- Ceratophysella caucasica Martynova, 1971
- Ceratophysella cavicola (Börner, 1901)
- Ceratophysella citri (Bacon, 1914)
- Ceratophysella communis (Folsom, 1897)
- Ceratophysella cylindrica Cassagnau, 1959
- Ceratophysella czelnokovi Martynova, 1978
- Ceratophysella czukczorum Martynova & Bondarenko, 1978
- Ceratophysella denisana (Yosii, 1956)
- Ceratophysella densornata (Maynard, 1951)
- Ceratophysella denticulata (Bagnall, 1941) (mushroom springtail)
- Ceratophysella dolsana (Lee & Kim, 1995)
- Ceratophysella duplicispinosa (Yosii, 1954)
- Ceratophysella empodialis Babenko in Babenko, Chernova, Potapov & Stebaeva, 1994
- Ceratophysella engadinensis (Gisin, 1949)
- Ceratophysella engeli Ellis, 1968
- Ceratophysella falcifer Cassagnau, 1959
- Ceratophysella flectoseta Lin & Xia, 1983
- Ceratophysella fujisana Itoh, 1985
- Ceratophysella gibbosa (Bagnall, 1940)
- Ceratophysella glancei Hammer, 1953
- Ceratophysella granulata Stach, 1949
- Ceratophysella granulifera Yosii, 1962
- Ceratophysella gravesi Wray, 1971
- Ceratophysella guthriei (Folsom, 1916)
- Ceratophysella impedita Skarzynski, 2002
- Ceratophysella indica Salmon, 1956
- Ceratophysella indovaria Salmon, 1970
- Ceratophysella ionescui (Börner, 1922)
- Ceratophysella isabellae Fjellberg, 1985
- Ceratophysella jondavi (Wray, 1946)
- Ceratophysella jonescoi (Bonet, 1930)
- Ceratophysella kapoviensis (Babenko in Babenko, Chernova, Potapov & Stebaeva, 1994)
- Ceratophysella katraensis (Tyagi & Baijal, 1972)
- Ceratophysella kolchidica (Babenko in Babenko, Chernova, Potapov & Stebaeva, 1994)
- Ceratophysella kutyrevae Babenko, 1994
- Ceratophysella laricis Martynova, 1977
- Ceratophysella lawrencei (Gisin, 1963)
- Ceratophysella liguladorsi Lee, 1974
- Ceratophysella longispina (Tullberg, 1876)
- Ceratophysella lucifuga (Packard, 1889)
- Ceratophysella macrocantha Stach, 1946
- Ceratophysella macrospinata (Maynard, 1951)
- Ceratophysella maheuxi (Butler, 1966)
- Ceratophysella maya Yosii, 1962
- Ceratophysella meridionalis (Nosek & Cervek, 1967)
- Ceratophysella michalinae Skarzynski, 2005
- Ceratophysella microchaeta Babenko in Babenko, Chernova, Potapov & Stebaeva, 1994
- Ceratophysella mocambicensis Cardoso, 1973
- Ceratophysella moroni Villalobos & Palacios-Vargas, 1986
- Ceratophysella morula Deharveng & Bourgeois, 1991
- Ceratophysella mosquensis (Becker, 1905)
- Ceratophysella mucronata Deharveng & Bourgeois, 1991
- Ceratophysella multilobata Skarzynski, 2006
- Ceratophysella najtae Villalobos & Palacios-Vargas, 1986
- Ceratophysella neomeridionalis Nosek & Cervek, 1970
- Ceratophysella norensis Cassagnau, 1964
- Ceratophysella orizabae Yosii, 1962
- Ceratophysella palustris Martynova, 1978
- Ceratophysella paraliguladorsi Nguyen, 2001
- Ceratophysella pecki (Christiansen & Bellinger, 1980)
- Ceratophysella penicillifer Cassagnau, 1964
- Ceratophysella planipila Yosii, 1966
- Ceratophysella platyna Park & Park, 2006
- Ceratophysella pratorum (Packard, 1873)
- Ceratophysella proserpinae (Yosii, 1956)
- Ceratophysella quinquesetosa Gisin, 1958
- Ceratophysella recta Cassagnau, 1959
- Ceratophysella robustiseta Skarzynski & Smolis, 2006
- Ceratophysella sakayorii Tamura, 1997
- Ceratophysella scotica (Carpenter & Evans, 1899)
- Ceratophysella scotti Yosii, 1962
- Ceratophysella sedecimocellata (Yosii, 1962)
- Ceratophysella semnacantha (Börner in Schille, 1912)
- Ceratophysella sextensis Cassagnau, 1968
- Ceratophysella sibirica Martynova, 1974
- Ceratophysella sigillata (Uzel, 1891)
- Ceratophysella silvatica Rusek, 1964
- Ceratophysella sinensis Stach, 1964
- Ceratophysella sinetertiaseta (Lee, 1974)
- Ceratophysella sphagni (Becker, 1905)
- Ceratophysella stercoraria Stach, 1963
- Ceratophysella succinea (Gisin, 1949)
- Ceratophysella tergilobata (Cassagnau, 1954)
- Ceratophysella tolteca Yosii, 1962
- Ceratophysella tomosvaryi Loksa, 1964
- Ceratophysella troglodites (Yosii, 1956)
- Ceratophysella tuberculata Cassagnau, 1959
- Ceratophysella vargovychi Skarzynski, Kaprus & Shrubovych, 2002
- Ceratophysella varians (Stach, 1967)
- Ceratophysella wrayia (Uchida & Tamura, 1968)
- Ceratophysella yakushimana Yosii, 1965
