= List of Xenylla species =

This is a list of 123 species in Xenylla, a genus of springtails in the family Hypogastruridae.

== Xenylla species ==
- Xenylla abichiana Winter, 1963^{i c g}
- Xenylla acauda Gisin, 1947^{i c g}
- Xenylla alba Folsom, 1932^{i c g}
- Xenylla aristides Fernando, 1959^{i c g}
- Xenylla atrata (Salmon, 1944)^{i c g}
- Xenylla auka Christiansen & Bellinger, 1992^{i c g}
- Xenylla australiensis da Gama, 1974^{i c g}
- Xenylla babenkoi Stebaeva & Potapov in Babenko, Chernova, Potapov & Stebaeva, 1994^{i c g}
- Xenylla badakhshanica Yosii, 1966^{i c g}
- Xenylla bellingeri da Gama, 1969^{i c g}
- Xenylla betulae Fjellberg, 1985^{i c g}
- Xenylla bismarckensis da Gama, 1969^{i c g}
- Xenylla boerneri Axelson, 1905^{i c g}
- Xenylla brasiliensis da Gama, 1978^{i c g}
- Xenylla brevicauda Tullberg, 1869^{i c g}
- Xenylla brevisimilis Stach, 1949^{i c g}
- Xenylla brevispina Kinoshita, 1916^{i c g}
- Xenylla californica da Gama, 1976^{i c g}
- Xenylla canadensis Hammer, 1953^{i c g}
- Xenylla capensis Weiner & Najt, 1991^{i c g}
- Xenylla capitata Thibaud & Massoud, 1980^{i c g}
- Xenylla carolinensis Wray, 1946^{i c g}
- Xenylla cassagnaui da Gama, 1983^{i c g}
- Xenylla caudata Jordana, 1993^{i c g}
- Xenylla cavarai Caroli, 1914^{i c g}
- Xenylla cavernarum Jackson, 1927^{i c g}
- Xenylla christianseni da Gama, 1974^{i c g}
- Xenylla claggi Wise, 1970^{i c g}
- Xenylla collis Bacon, 1914^{i c g}
- Xenylla constricta von Olfers, 1907^{i c g}
- Xenylla continentalis Stebaeva & Potapov in Babenko, Chernova, Potapov & Stebaeva, 1994^{i c g}
- Xenylla convexopyga Lee, Park & Park, 2005^{i c g}
- Xenylla corticalis Börner, 1901^{i c g}
- Xenylla deharvengi da Gama, 1983^{i c g}
- Xenylla dotata Lee, Park & Park, 2005^{i c g}
- Xenylla duchesnea Wray, 1958^{i c g}
- Xenylla fernandesi da Gama, 1974^{i c g}
- Xenylla franzi Steiner, 1955^{i c g}
- Xenylla gamae Cardoso, 1967^{i c g}
- Xenylla gisini Cardoso, 1968^{i c g}
- Xenylla gomerensis Fjellberg, 1992^{i c g}
- Xenylla granulosa da Gama, 1966^{i c g}
- Xenylla greensladeae da Gama, 1974^{i c g}
- Xenylla grisea Axelson, 1900^{i c g b}
- Xenylla hadialii Baijal, 1955^{i c g}
- Xenylla hawaiiensis da Gama, 1969^{i c g}
- Xenylla helena Scott, 1937^{i c g}
- Xenylla hexagona Fjellberg, 1992^{i c g}
- Xenylla hodori Neves & Mendonça, 2017^{g}
- Xenylla humicola (Fabricius, 1780)^{i c g}
- Xenylla inermis Olfers, 1907^{i c g}
- Xenylla jamaicensis da Gama, 1969^{i c g}
- Xenylla jocquei Andrè, 1988^{i c g}
- Xenylla kenyensis da Gama, 1969^{i c g}
- Xenylla kirgisica Martynova, 1976^{i c g}
- Xenylla laurisilvae Fjellberg, 1992^{i c g}
- Xenylla lawrencei da Gama, 1967^{i c g}
- Xenylla lesnei Denis, 1935^{i c g}
- Xenylla littoralis Womersley, 1933^{i c g}
- Xenylla longicauda Folsom, 1898^{i c g}
- Xenylla longispina Uzel, 1890^{i c g}
- Xenylla longistriata Lee, Park & Park, 2005^{i c g}
- Xenylla louisiana da Gama, 1976^{i c g}
- Xenylla malasica da Gama, 1969^{i c g}
- Xenylla malayana Salmon, 1951^{i c g}
- Xenylla manusiensis da Gama, 1967^{i c g}
- Xenylla marina Lee, Park & Park, 2005^{i c g}
- Xenylla maritima Tullberg, 1869^{i c g}
- Xenylla martynovae Dunger, 1983^{i c g}
- Xenylla mediterranea Gama, 1964^{g}
- Xenylla mongolica Martynova, 1975^{i c g}
- Xenylla mucronata Axelson, 1903^{i c g}
- Xenylla murphyi da Gama, 1969^{i c g}
- Xenylla myrmecophila Stebaeva & Potapov in Babenko, Chernova, Potapov & Stebaeva, 1994^{i c g}
- Xenylla neivai da Gama, 1966^{i c g}
- Xenylla nigeriana da Gama & Lasebikan, 1976^{i c g}
- Xenylla nirae da Gama & de Oliveira, 1994^{i c g}
- Xenylla nitida Tullberg, 1871^{i c g}
- Xenylla obscura Imms, 1912^{i c g}
- Xenylla occidentalis Womersley, 1933^{i c g}
- Xenylla octooculata Carpenter, 1928^{i c g}
- Xenylla orientalis Handschin, 1932^{i c g}
- Xenylla osetica Stebaeva & Potapov in Babenko, Chernova, Potapov & Stebaeva, 1994^{i c g}
- Xenylla pallescens (Scott, 1960)^{i c g}
- Xenylla paludis (Bacon, 1914)^{i c g}
- Xenylla piceeta Stebaeva & Potapov in Babenko, Chernova, Potapov & Stebaeva, 1994^{i c g}
- Xenylla portoricensis da Gama, 1976^{i c g}
- Xenylla proxima Denis, 1931^{i c g}
- Xenylla pseudobrevicauda Ritter, 1911^{i c g}
- Xenylla pseudomaritima James, 1933^{i c g}
- Xenylla pyrenaica Cassagnau, 1959^{i c g}
- Xenylla raynalae Najt, Thibaud & Weiner, 1990^{i c g}
- Xenylla reducta Prabhoo, 1971^{i c g}
- Xenylla rhodesiensis Womersley, 1926^{i c g}
- Xenylla saludoi Izarra, 1970^{i c g}
- Xenylla schillei Börner, 1903^{i c g}
- Xenylla simberloffi da Gama, 1974^{i c g}
- Xenylla similata Denis, 1948^{i c g}
- Xenylla sincta Baijal, 1956^{i c g}
- Xenylla spinosissima Najt & Rubio, 1978^{i c g}
- Xenylla stachi da Gama, 1966^{i c g}
- Xenylla stepposa Stebaeva, 1980^{i c g}
- Xenylla subacauda Stebaeva & Potapov in Babenko, Chernova, Potapov & Stebaeva, 1994^{i c g}
- Xenylla subbellingeri da Gama, 1976^{i c g}
- Xenylla subcavernarum da Gama, 1969^{i c g}
- Xenylla tadzhika Martynova, 1968^{i c g}
- Xenylla thailandensis da Gama, 1986^{i c g}
- Xenylla thiensis Deharveng & Najt in Tillier, 1988^{i c g}
- Xenylla trisubloba Stebaeva & Potapov in Babenko, Chernova, Potapov & Stebaeva, 1994^{i c g}
- Xenylla tullbergi Börner, 1903^{i c g}
- Xenylla uniseta da Gama, 1963^{i c g}
- Xenylla victoriana da Gama, 1979^{i c g}
- Xenylla vilhenaorum da Gama, 1966^{i c g}
- Xenylla villiersi Thibaud, 1963^{i c g}
- Xenylla welchi Folsom, 1916^{i c g}
- Xenylla westraliensis da Gama, 1974^{i c g}
- Xenylla wilsoni da Gama, 1974^{i c g}
- Xenylla womersleyi da Gama, 1974^{i c g}
- Xenylla xavieri da Gama, 1959^{i c g}
- Xenylla yosiiana da Gama, 1971^{i c g}
- Xenylla yucatana Mills in Pearse, 1938^{i c g}
- Xenylla zairensis Martynova, 1979^{i c g}
- Xenylla zavattari (Tarsia in Curia, 1939)^{i c g}

Data sources: i = ITIS, c = Catalogue of Life, g = GBIF, b = Bugguide.net
