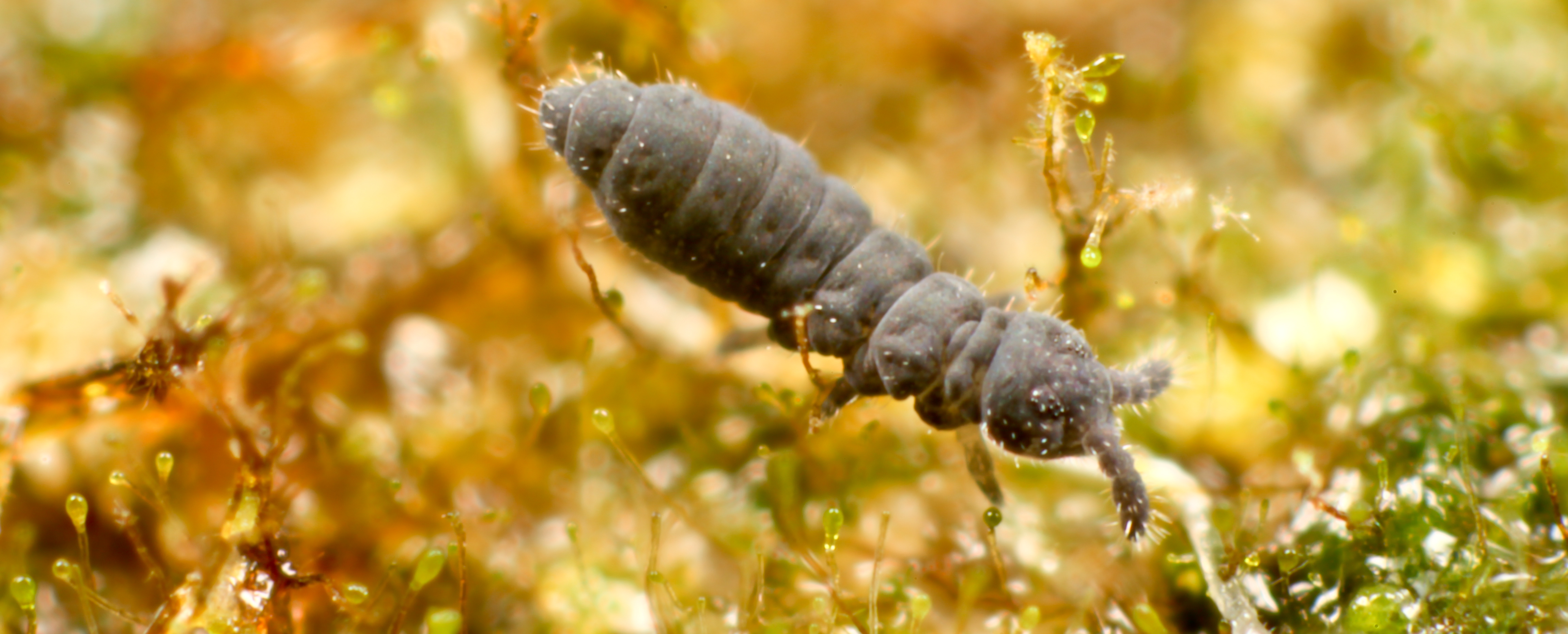
- Hypogastrura

Scientific classification
- Domain: Eukaryota
- Kingdom: Animalia
- Phylum: Arthropoda
- Class: Collembola
- Order: Poduromorpha
- Superfamily: Hypogastruroidea

= Hypogastruroidea =

Superfamily of springtails

Hypogastruroidea is a superfamily of springtails in the order Poduromorpha. There are at least 2 families and more than 700 described species in Hypogastruroidea.

== Families ==
These two families belong to the superfamily Hypogastruroidea. Pachytullbergiidae is sometimes included in this superfamily, also.

- Hypogastruridae Börner, 1906
- Paleotullbergiidae Stach, 1954
