= List of Hypogastrura species =

This is a list of 159 species in the genus Hypogastrura.

== Hypogastrura species ==
- Hypogastrura aequipilosa (Stach, 1949)
- Hypogastrura aethiopica (Tarsia in Curia, 1939)
- Hypogastrura affinis (Lucas, 1846)
- Hypogastrura agaricina Bourlet, 1841
- Hypogastrura albamaculata Scott, 1960
- Hypogastrura albella (Koch, 1840)
- Hypogastrura alta Christiansen & Bellinger, 1980
- Hypogastrura antra Christiansen & Bellinger, 1980
- Hypogastrura arctandria Fjellberg, 1988
- Hypogastrura assimilis (Krausbauer, 1898)
- Hypogastrura aterrima Yosii, 1972
- Hypogastrura austriaca Babenko & Thibaud, 1990
- Hypogastrura baltica Tyagi & Baijal, 1982
- Hypogastrura barguzini Babenko in Babenko, Chernova, Potapov & Stebaeva, 1994
- Hypogastrura bilineata (Koch, 1840)
- Hypogastrura bokusi Yosii, 1961
- Hypogastrura boldorii Denis, 1931
- Hypogastrura breviempodialis (Stach, 1949)
- Hypogastrura brevifurca Skarzynski, 2000
- Hypogastrura brevispina (Harvey, 1893)
- Hypogastrura bulba Christiansen & Bellinger, 1980
- Hypogastrura caduceator (Carpenter, 1919)
- Hypogastrura calceolaris Latzel, 1918
- Hypogastrura campbelli Womersley, 1930
- Hypogastrura capitata Cassagnau & Delamare Deboutteville, 1955
- Hypogastrura carpatica Nosek, 1962
- Hypogastrura cellaris (Nicolet, 1842)
- Hypogastrura chouardi Cassagnau, 1959
- Hypogastrura christianseni Yosii, 1960
- Hypogastrura concolor (Carpenter, 1900)
- Hypogastrura conflictiva Jordana & Arbea, 1992
- Hypogastrura consanguinea (Folsom, 1924)
- Hypogastrura copiosa (Folsom, 1916)
- Hypogastrura coprophila Stach, 1960
- Hypogastrura crassa (Oudemans, 1890)
- Hypogastrura crassaegranulata (Stach, 1949)
- Hypogastrura dasiensis Selga, 1966
- Hypogastrura deserti Babenko in Babenko, Chernova, Potapov & Stebaeva, 1994
- Hypogastrura devia Christiansen & Bellinger, 1980
- Hypogastrura distincta (Axelson, 1902)
- Hypogastrura druki Babenko in Babenko, Chernova, Potapov & Stebaeva, 1994
- Hypogastrura elegans (Parfitt, 1891)
- Hypogastrura elevata Cassagnau, 1959
- Hypogastrura exigua Gisin, 1958
- Hypogastrura fjellbergi Babenko & Bulavintsev, 1993
- Hypogastrura franconiana (Stach, 1949)
- Hypogastrura fuentei Denis, 1930
- Hypogastrura funesta Christiansen & Bellinger, 1980
- Hypogastrura gami (Wray, 1952)
- Hypogastrura gennargentui Dallai, 1971
- Hypogastrura ghirkani Babenko in Babenko, Chernova, Potapov & Stebaeva, 1994
- Hypogastrura gisini Strenzke, 1954
- Hypogastrura gracilis (Folsom, 1899)
- Hypogastrura harveyi (Folsom, 1902) (snow flea)
- Hypogastrura hatiparae Babenko in Babenko, Chernova, Potapov & Stebaeva, 1994
- Hypogastrura helena Christiansen & Bellinger, 1980
- Hypogastrura himalayana Yosii, 1971
- Hypogastrura hispanica Steiner, 1955
- Hypogastrura hohi Babenko in Babenko, Chernova, Potapov & Stebaeva, 1994
- Hypogastrura humi (Folsom, 1916)
- Hypogastrura hyperborea (Boheman, 1865)
- Hypogastrura hypnorum (Fabricius, 1783)
- Hypogastrura inopinata Deharveng & Le Cong Man, 2002
- Hypogastrura intermedia Handschin, 1926
- Hypogastrura ireneae (Wray, 1953)
- Hypogastrura iwamurai Yosii, 1960
- Hypogastrura japonica Scott, 1961
- Hypogastrura katraensis Tyagi & Baijal, 1982
- Hypogastrura kelmendica Peja, 1985
- Hypogastrura lapponica (Axelson, 1902)
- Hypogastrura laxasensillata Lee, 1974
- Hypogastrura leo Palacios-Vargas, 1986
- Hypogastrura lima Christiansen & Bellinger, 1980
- Hypogastrura litoralis (Linnaniemi, 1909)
- Hypogastrura longimucrona Lee & Choe, 1979
- Hypogastrura macrotuberculata (Hammer, 1953)
- Hypogastrura madera Christiansen & Bellinger, 1980
- Hypogastrura magistri Babenko in Babenko, Chernova, Potapov & Stebaeva, 1994
- Hypogastrura manubrialis (Tullberg, 1869)
- Hypogastrura matura (Folsom, 1916)
- Hypogastrura maxillosa Babenko in Babenko, Chernova, Potapov & Stebaeva, 1994
- Hypogastrura maynardi Christiansen & Bellinger, 1980
- Hypogastrura meridionalis Steiner, 1955
- Hypogastrura mexicana Handschin, 1928
- Hypogastrura microspina Babenko in Babenko, Chernova, Potapov & Stebaeva, 1994
- Hypogastrura mongolica (Nosek, 1976)
- Hypogastrura montana (Becker, 1905)
- Hypogastrura monticola Stach, 1946
- Hypogastrura morbillata (Salmon, 1941)
- Hypogastrura myrmecophila (Womersley, 1929)
- Hypogastrura narkandae (Baijal, 1955)
- Hypogastrura nemoralis Yosii, 1960
- Hypogastrura nepalica Yosii, 1966
- Hypogastrura nivicola (Fitch, 1846) (snow flea)
- Hypogastrura norica Latzel, 1919
- Hypogastrura obliqua Salmon, 1949
- Hypogastrura omnigra (Salmon, 1941)
- Hypogastrura oregonensis Yosii, 1960
- Hypogastrura oreophila Butschek, 1948
- Hypogastrura packardi (Folsom, 1902)
- Hypogastrura pahiku Christiansen & Bellinger, 1992
- Hypogastrura papillata Gisin, 1949
- Hypogastrura paradoxa Yosii, 1965
- Hypogastrura parvula Haybach, 1972
- Hypogastrura perplexa Christiansen & Bellinger, 1980
- Hypogastrura pityusica Ellis, 1974
- Hypogastrura prabhooi Bhattacharjee, 1985
- Hypogastrura promatro (Wray, 1950)
- Hypogastrura protoviatica Handschin, 1926
- Hypogastrura punctata (Coleman, 1941)
- Hypogastrura purpurescens (Lubbock, 1867)
- Hypogastrura pyrenaica (Cassagnau, 1959)
- Hypogastrura ramia Lee & Choe, 1979
- Hypogastrura rangkuli Martynova, 1975
- Hypogastrura rehi Börner, 1906
- Hypogastrura reticulata Börner, 1909
- Hypogastrura rossi (Salmon, 1941)
- Hypogastrura sahlbergi (Reuter, 1895)
- Hypogastrura sensilis (Folsom, 1919)
- Hypogastrura serrata (Ågren, 1904)
- Hypogastrura similis (Nicolet, 1847)
- Hypogastrura similis Absolon, 1901
- Hypogastrura simsi Hart & Waltz, 1995
- Hypogastrura socialis (Uzel, 1891)
- Hypogastrura sonapani Baijal, 1958
- Hypogastrura sparta Christiansen & Bellinger, 1980
- Hypogastrura spei Babenko in Babenko, Chernova, Potapov & Stebaeva, 1994
- Hypogastrura spelaea (Joseph, 1882)
- Hypogastrura subboldorii Delamare Deboutteville & Jacquemart, 1962
- Hypogastrura subpapillata Babenko in Babenko, Chernova, Potapov & Stebaeva, 1994
- Hypogastrura synacantha Cassagnau & Deharveng, 1976
- Hypogastrura szeptyckii Skarzynski, 2006
- Hypogastrura tatrica (Stach, 1949)
- Hypogastrura tchabensis Babenko in Babenko, Chernova, Potapov & Stebaeva, 1994
- Hypogastrura temarpurensis Tyagi & Baijal, 1982
- Hypogastrura tethyca Ellis, 1976
- Hypogastrura theeli (Tullberg, 1876)
- Hypogastrura tianshanica Martynova, 1970
- Hypogastrura tigridis (Brown, 1925)
- Hypogastrura tigrina (Harvey, 1900)
- Hypogastrura tooliki Fjellberg, 1985 (toolik snow flea)
- Hypogastrura trilobata Linnaniemi, 1912
- Hypogastrura trybomi (Schött, 1893)
- Hypogastrura tsukubaensis Tamura, 1997
- Hypogastrura tullbergi (Schäffer, 1900)
- Hypogastrura turkmenica Babenko in Babenko, Chernova, Potapov & Stebaeva, 1994
- Hypogastrura ubsunurensis Babenko, 1999
- Hypogastrura unguiculata Mitra, 1966
- Hypogastrura utahensis (Wray, 1953)
- Hypogastrura vernalis (Carl, 1901)
- Hypogastrura verruculata Rusek, 1967
- Hypogastrura viatica (Tullberg, 1872)
- Hypogastrura xiaoi Tamura in Tamura & Zhao, 1998
- Hypogastrura yamagata Kinoshita, 1916
- Hypogastrura yinae Yue & Fu, 2000
- Hypogastrura yongmuensis Lee, 1974
- Hypogastrura yosii Stach, 1964
- Hypogastrura zhangi Zhao in Tamura & Zhao, 1998
- Hypogastrura zivadinovici Palissa, 1968
