= Schaefferia profundissima =

Scientific classification
- Domain: Eukaryota
- Kingdom: Animalia
- Phylum: Arthropoda
- Class: Collembola
- Order: Poduromorpha
- Family: Hypogastruridae
- Genus: Schaefferia
- Species: S. profundissima

Binomial name
- Schaefferia profundissima Jordana & Baquero, 2012

Species of springtail

Schaefferia profundissima is a species of springtail (arthropods) endemic to the Krubera-Voronja cave system in Georgia. It is one of the deepest terrestrial animal ever found on Earth, living at >1,800 metres (5,900 ft) below the cave entrance. It was discovered in the CAVEX Team expedition of 2010.
