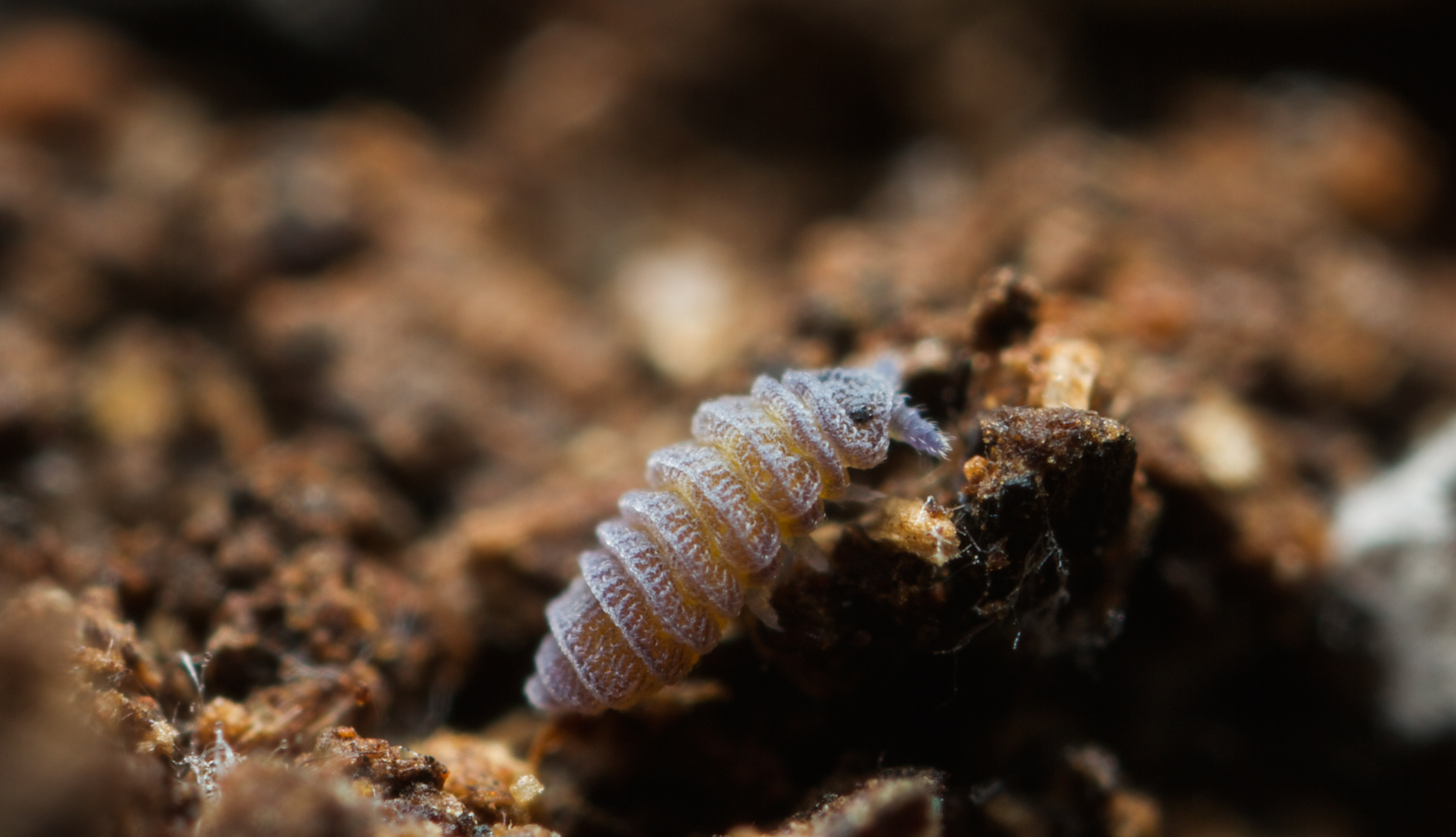
- Odontellidae

Scientific classification
- Domain: Eukaryota
- Kingdom: Animalia
- Phylum: Arthropoda
- Class: Collembola
- Order: Poduromorpha
- Superfamily: Onychiuroidea

= Onychiuroidea =

Superfamily of springtails

Onychiuroidea is a superfamily of springtails in the order Poduromorpha. There are about 5 families and more than 630 described species in Onychiuroidea.

== Families ==
These five families belong to the superfamily Onychiuroidea, according to Checklist of the Collembola of the World. The families Isotogastruridae, Odontellidae, and Pachytullbergiidae are sometimes listed as members of other superfamilies.

- Isotogastruridae Thibaud & Najt, 1992
- Odontellidae Massoud, 1967
- Onychiuridae Lubbock, 1913
- Pachytullbergiidae Stach, 1954
- Tullbergiidae Bagnall, 1935
