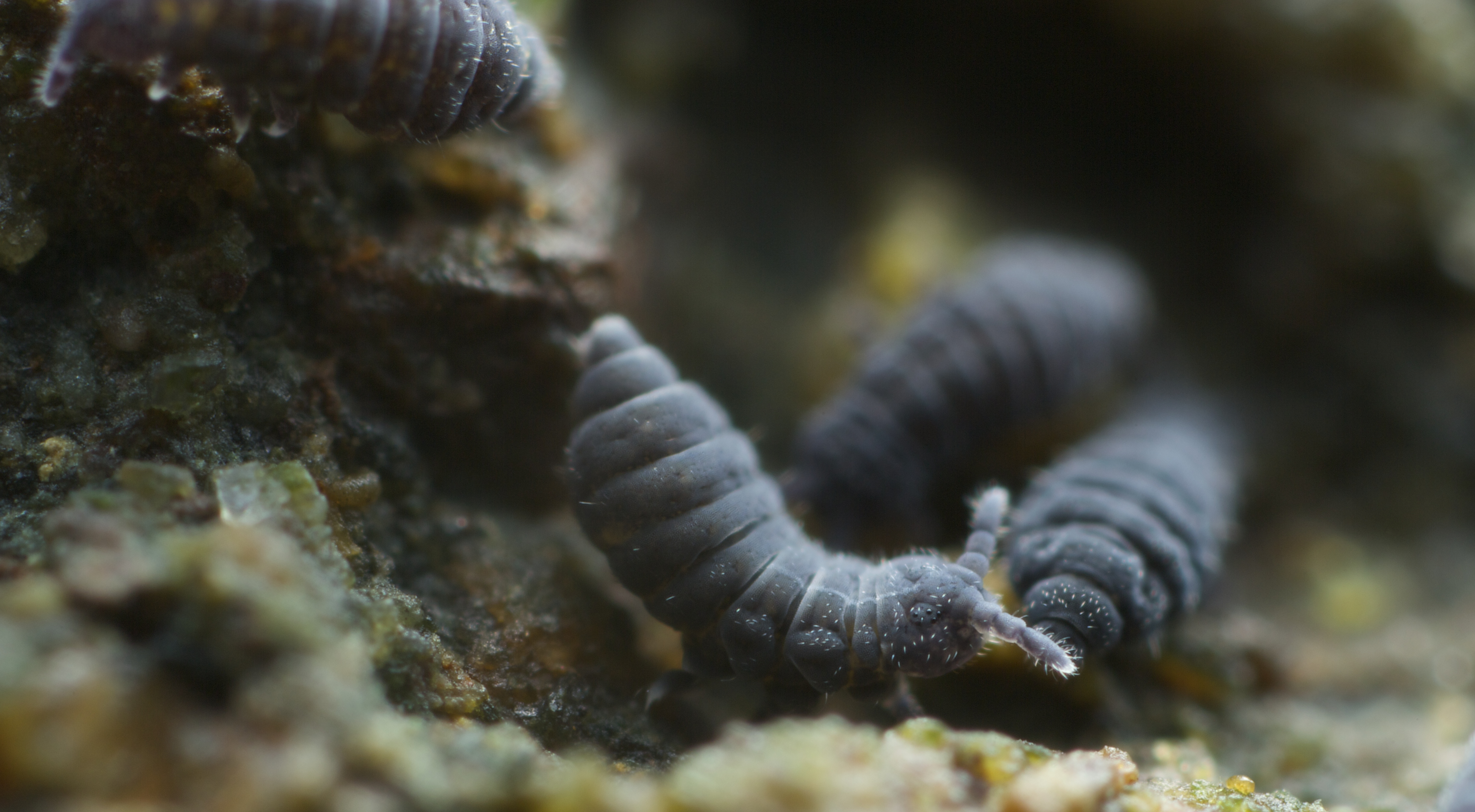

Scientific classification
- Kingdom: Animalia
- Phylum: Arthropoda
- Clade: Pancrustacea
- Class: Collembola
- Order: Poduromorpha
- Family: Hypogastruridae
- Genus: Xenylla
- Species: X. littoralis

Binomial name
- Xenylla littoralis (Womersley, 1933)

= Xenylla littoralis =

Species of springtail

Xenylla littoralis is a species of springtail of the family Hypogastruridae described in 1933 by the English entomologist Herbert Womersley. Its description is in the records of the South Australian Museum.
