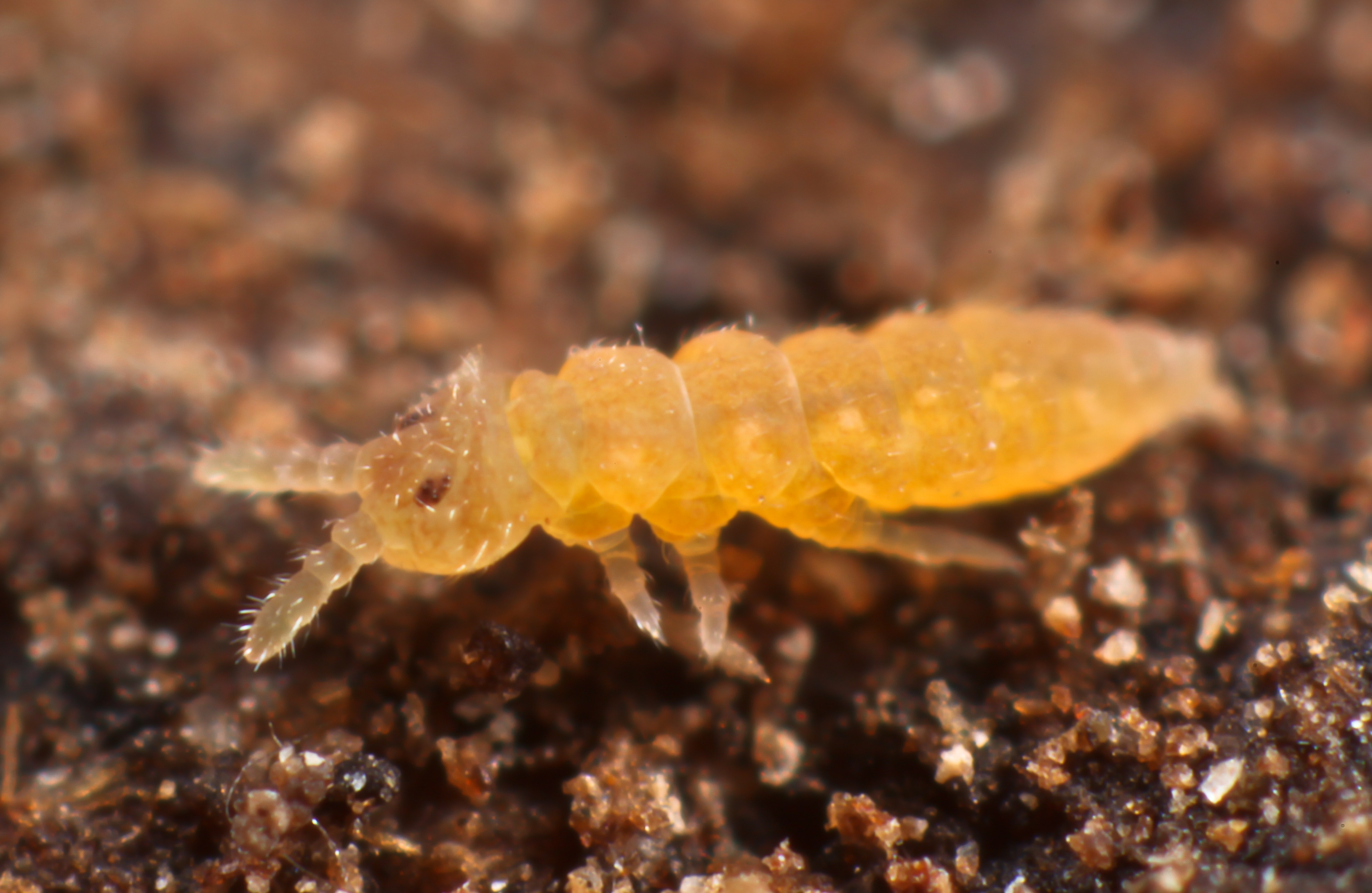
- Ceratophysella succinea engadinensis

Scientific classification
- Domain: Eukaryota
- Kingdom: Animalia
- Phylum: Arthropoda
- Class: Collembola
- Order: Poduromorpha
- Family: Hypogastruridae
- Genus: Ceratophysella
- Species: C. succinea

Binomial name
- Ceratophysella succinea (Gisin, 1949)

Synonyms
- Hypogastrura succinea Gisin, 1949

= Ceratophysella succinea =

Species of springtail

Ceratophysella succinea is a species of springtails in the family Hypogastruridae.
