= Schaefferia duodecimocellata =

Scientific classification
- Domain: Eukaryota
- Kingdom: Animalia
- Phylum: Arthropoda
- Class: Collembola
- Order: Poduromorpha
- Family: Hypogastruridae
- Genus: Schaefferia
- Species: S. duodecimocellata

Binomial name
- Schaefferia duodecimocellata Bonet, 1945

Synonyms
- Schaefferia cheoha Wray, 1963

Species of springtail

Schaefferia duodecimocellata is a species of springtails in the family Hypogastruridae.
