= Cosberella lamaralexanderi =

Scientific classification
- Kingdom: Animalia
- Phylum: Arthropoda
- Clade: Pancrustacea
- Class: Collembola
- Order: Poduromorpha
- Family: Hypogastruridae
- Genus: Cosberella
- Species: C. lamaralexanderi

Binomial name
- Cosberella lamaralexanderi Bernard, 2006

Species of springtail

Cosberella lamaralexanderi, or the Lamar Alexander springtail, is a species of springtails native to the southern Appalachian Mountains of the United States.

It was discovered in 2006 by Dr. Earnest Bernard in Great Smoky Mountains National Park. He named it in honor of U.S. Senator Lamar Alexander of Tennessee because of his support of scientific research funding in the park and because the springtails' patterning is reminiscent of the plaid shirts that Alexander typically wears while campaigning.
