= Hypogastrura tooliki =

Scientific classification
- Domain: Eukaryota
- Kingdom: Animalia
- Phylum: Arthropoda
- Class: Collembola
- Order: Poduromorpha
- Family: Hypogastruridae
- Genus: Hypogastrura
- Species: H. tooliki

Binomial name
- Hypogastrura tooliki Fjellberg, 1985

Species of springtail

Hypogastrura tooliki, the toolik snow flea, is a species of springtails in the family Hypogastruridae.
