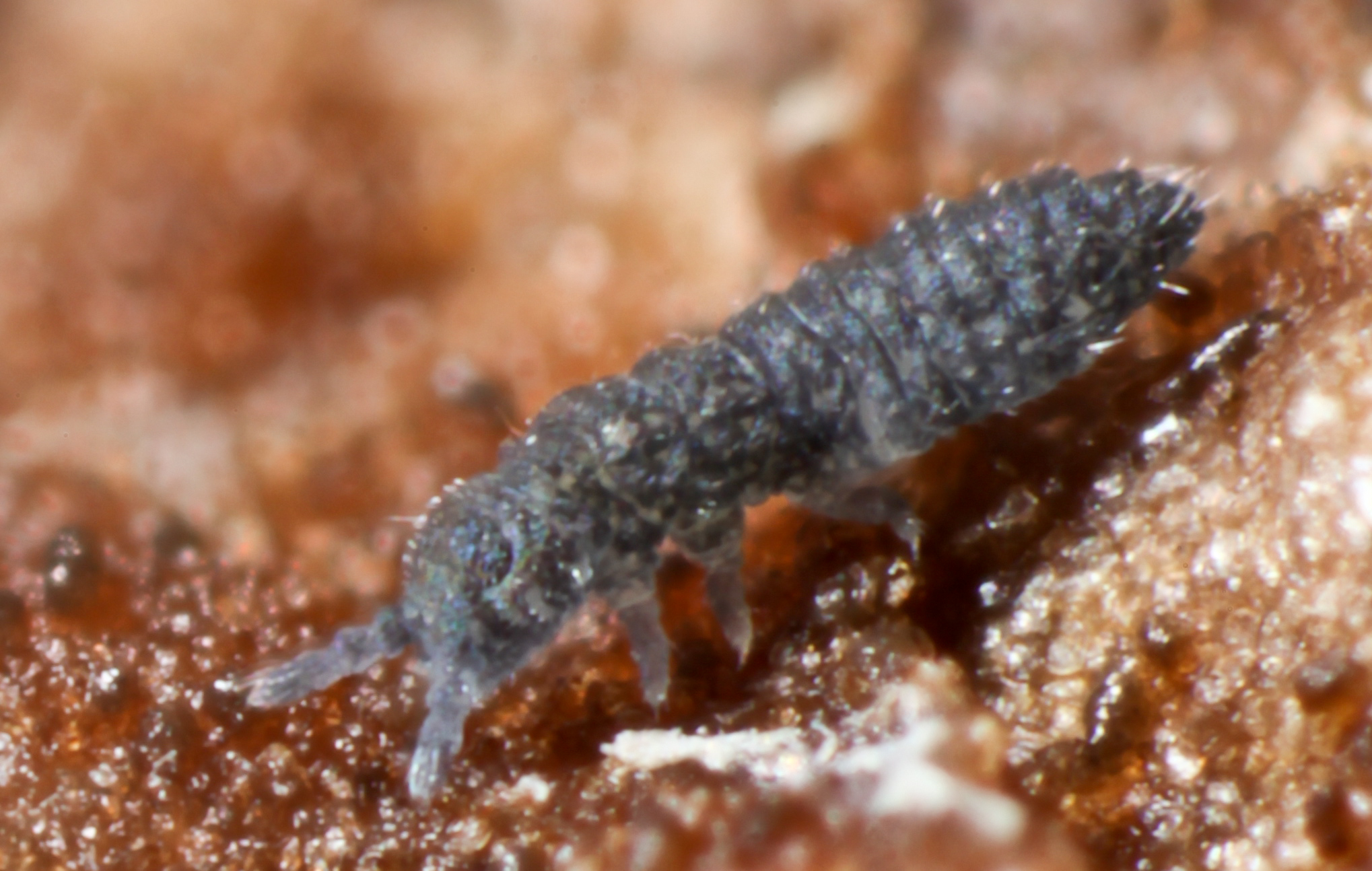

Scientific classification
- Kingdom: Animalia
- Phylum: Arthropoda
- Class: Collembola
- Order: Poduromorpha
- Family: Hypogastruridae
- Genus: Xenylla
- Species: X. grisea

Binomial name
- Xenylla grisea Axelson, 1900

= Xenylla grisea =

Species of springtail

Xenylla grisea is a species of springtails in the family Hypogastruridae.
