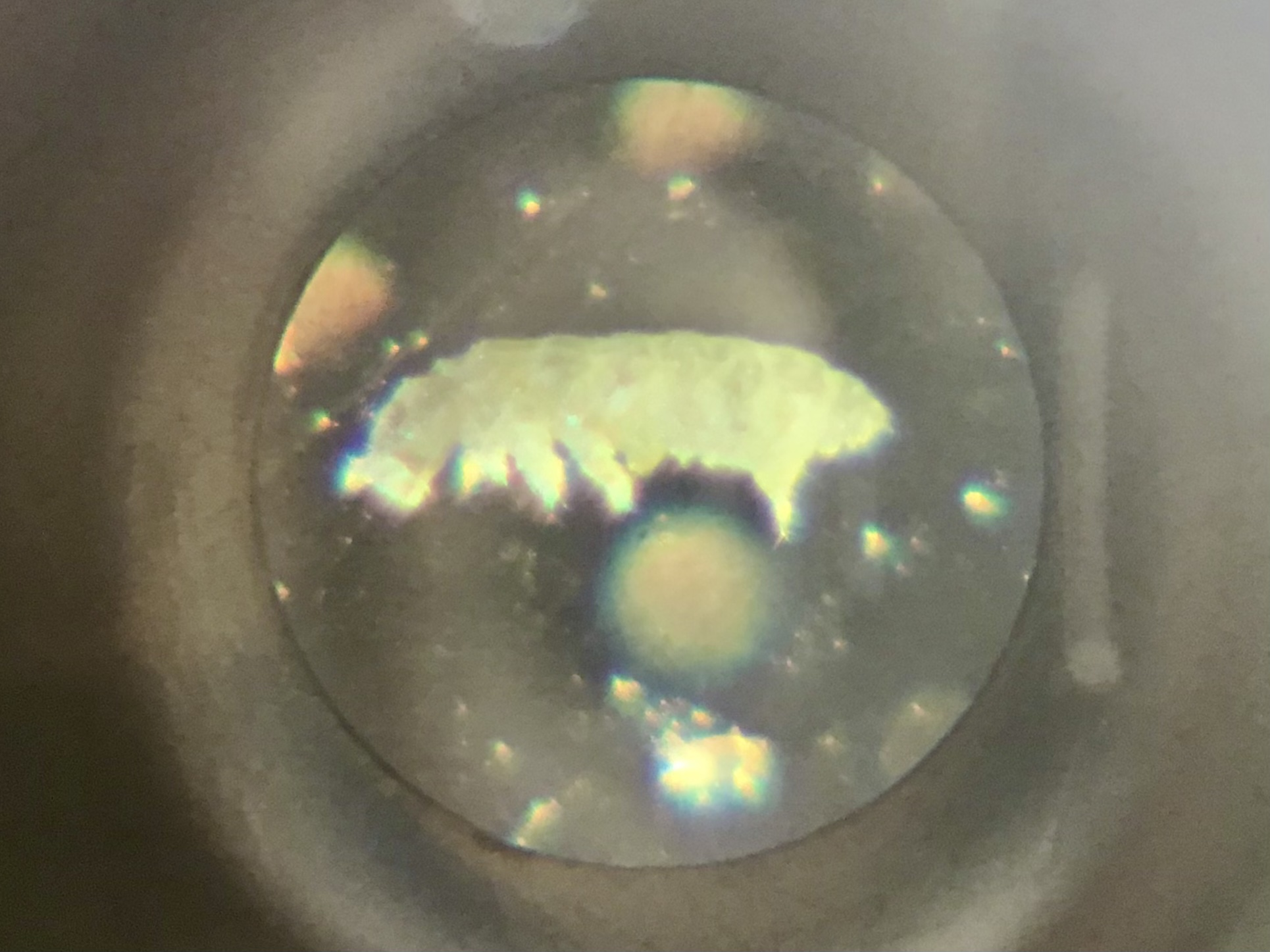
- A Hypogastrura manubrialis magnified by a hundred times

Scientific classification
- Domain: Eukaryota
- Kingdom: Animalia
- Phylum: Arthropoda
- Class: Collembola
- Order: Poduromorpha
- Family: Hypogastruridae
- Genus: Hypogastrura
- Species: H. manubrialis

Binomial name
- Hypogastrura manubrialis (Tullberg, 1869)

= Hypogastrura manubrialis =

Species of springtail

Hypogastrura manubrialis is a species of springtail in the family Hypogastruridae.
