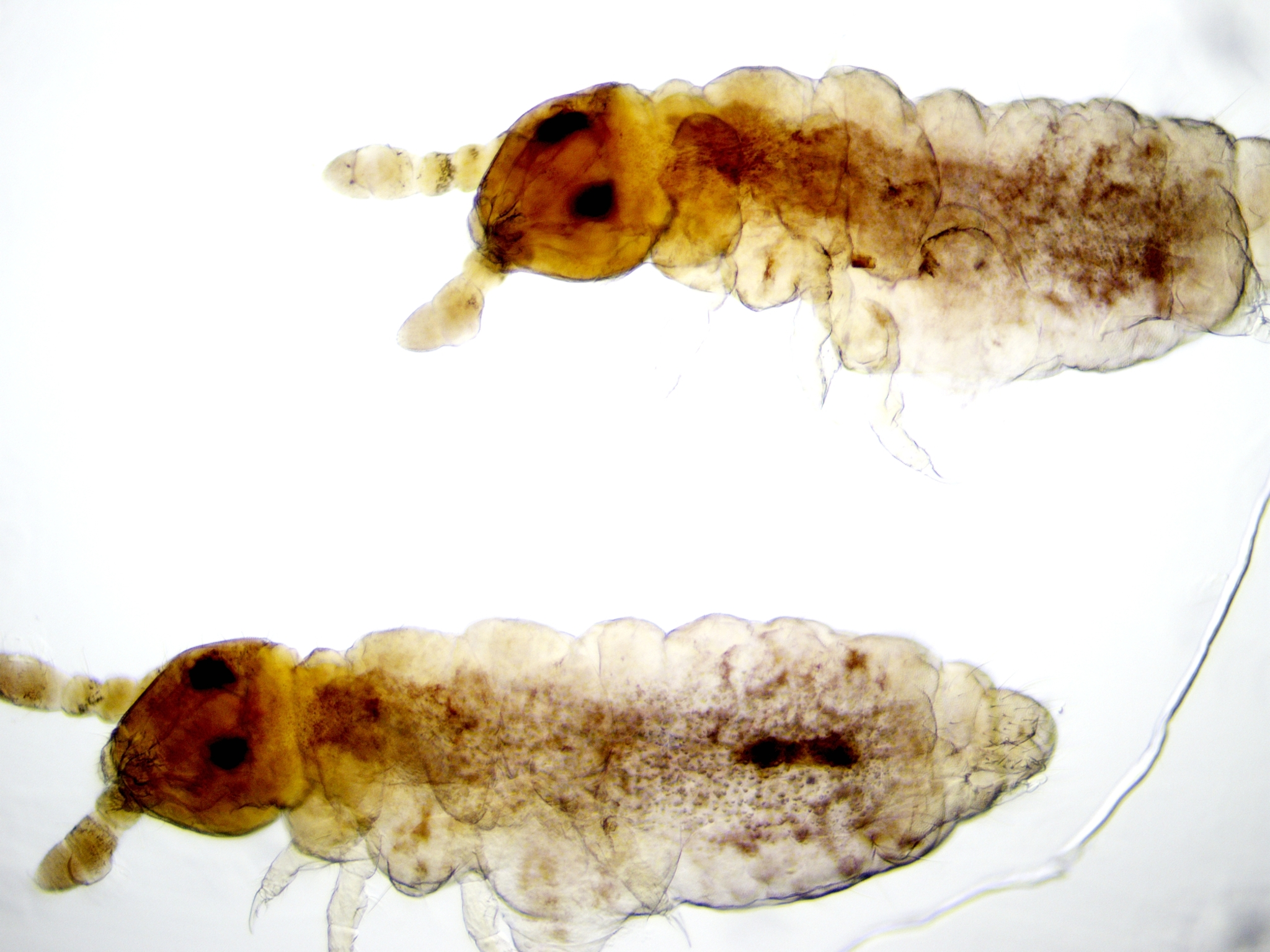

Scientific classification
- Kingdom: Animalia
- Phylum: Arthropoda
- Class: Collembola
- Order: Poduromorpha
- Family: Hypogastruridae
- Genus: Ceratophysella
- Species: C. denticulata

Binomial name
- Ceratophysella denticulata (Bagnall, 1941)

Synonyms
- Achorutes denticulatus Bagnall, 1941; Hypogastrura engadinensis Gisin, 1949; Hypogastrura exilis Yosii, 1956

= Ceratophysella denticulata =

Species of springtail

Ceratophysella denticulata, the mushroom springtail, is a species of springtails in the family Hypogastruridae.
