= Sensiphorura tiunovi =

Scientific classification
- Domain: Eukaryota
- Kingdom: Animalia
- Phylum: Arthropoda
- Class: Collembola
- Order: Poduromorpha
- Family: Pachytullbergiidae
- Genus: Sensiphorura
- Species: S. tiunovi

Binomial name
- Sensiphorura tiunovi Y.B.Shveenkova, 2017

Species of arthropods

Sensiphorura tiunovi is a species of springtail in the family Pachytullbergiidae. First described in 2017 by Yulia B. Shveenkova, this species is found in southern Vietnam.

== Description ==
Unlike other species in its genus, S. tiunovi lacks microsensilla (sensorial organs) on its thorax.
