= Ceratophysella gibbosa =

Scientific classification
- Domain: Eukaryota
- Kingdom: Animalia
- Phylum: Arthropoda
- Class: Collembola
- Order: Poduromorpha
- Family: Hypogastruridae
- Genus: Ceratophysella
- Species: C. gibbosa

Binomial name
- Ceratophysella gibbosa (Bagnall, 1940)

Synonyms
- Hypogastrura azteca Yosii, 1962

Species of springtail

Ceratophysella gibbosa is a species of springtails in the family Hypogastruridae.
