= Hypogastrura harveyi =

Scientific classification
- Domain: Eukaryota
- Kingdom: Animalia
- Phylum: Arthropoda
- Class: Collembola
- Order: Poduromorpha
- Family: Hypogastruridae
- Genus: Hypogastrura
- Species: H. harveyi

Binomial name
- Hypogastrura harveyi (Folsom, 1902)

Synonyms
- Achorutes harveyi Folsom, 1902; Hypogastrura indiana Christiansen & Bellinger, 1980

Species of springtail

Hypogastrura harveyi, the snow flea, is a species of springtails in the family Hypogastruridae.
