= Ceratophysella pratorum =

Scientific classification
- Domain: Eukaryota
- Kingdom: Animalia
- Phylum: Arthropoda
- Class: Collembola
- Order: Poduromorpha
- Family: Hypogastruridae
- Genus: Ceratophysella
- Species: C. pratorum

Binomial name
- Ceratophysella pratorum (Packard, 1873)

Synonyms
- Achorutes pratorum Packard, 1873

Species of springtail

Ceratophysella pratorum is a species of springtails in the family Hypogastruridae.
