= Cosberella denali =

Scientific classification
- Kingdom: Animalia
- Phylum: Arthropoda
- Class: Collembola
- Order: Poduromorpha
- Family: Hypogastruridae
- Genus: Cosberella
- Species: C. denali

Binomial name
- Cosberella denali Fjellberg, 1985

Synonyms
- Hypogastrura denali

Species of springtail

Cosberella denali is a springtail species of the family Hypogastruridae. It is endemic to Alaska. Arne Fjellberg, who first described the species in 1985, theorized three potential subspecies based on significant morphological differences – one each found in the Alaska Range, the Brooks Range, and the Alaska North Slope.

== Description ==
Cosberella denali is distinguished from other springtail species by the presence of denticles covering the sixth lamella of the maxilla and a short ventroapical hyaline area.
