= Acherontides =

Scientific classification
- Kingdom: Animalia
- Phylum: Arthropoda
- Clade: Pancrustacea
- Class: Collembola
- Order: Poduromorpha
- Family: Hypogastruridae
- Genus: Acherontides; Bonet, 1945

Genus of springtails

Acherontides is a genus of springtails in the family Hypogastruridae. There are about 11 described species in Acherontides.

== Species ==
These 11 species belong to the genus Acherontides:

- Acherontides atoyacensis Bonet, 1945^{i c g}
- Acherontides bullocki Palacios-Vargas & Gòmez-Anaya, 1996^{i c g}
- Acherontides eleonorae Palacios-Vargas & Gnaspini-Netto, 1993^{i c g}
- Acherontides huetheri Deharveng & Diaz, 1984^{i c g}
- Acherontides juxtlahuacaensis Palacios-Vargas & Gòmez-Anaya, 1996^{i c g}
- Acherontides leo Palacios-Vargas & Gnaspini-Netto, 1992^{i c g}
- Acherontides pappogeomysae Palacios-Vargas & Gòmez-Anaya, 1996^{i c g}
- Acherontides peruensis Hüther, 1975^{i c g}
- Acherontides potosinus Bonet, 1946^{i c g}
- Acherontides spinus (Christiansen & Reddell, 1986)^{i c g}
- Acherontides tanasachiae (Gruia, 1969)^{i c g}

Data sources: i = ITIS, c = Catalogue of Life, g = GBIF, b = Bugguide.net
