= Gnathogastrura =

Scientific classification
- Domain: Eukaryota
- Kingdom: Animalia
- Phylum: Arthropoda
- Class: Collembola
- Order: Poduromorpha
- Family: Hypogastruridae
- Genus: Gnathogastrura; Dìaz & Najt, 1983

Genus of springtails

Gnathogastrura is a genus of springtails in the family Hypogastruridae. There is at least one described species in Gnathogastrura, G. paramoensis.
