= Mesogastrura =

Scientific classification
- Domain: Eukaryota
- Kingdom: Animalia
- Phylum: Arthropoda
- Class: Collembola
- Order: Poduromorpha
- Family: Hypogastruridae
- Genus: Mesogastrura; Bonet, 1930

Genus of springtails

Mesogastrura is a genus of springtails in the family Hypogastruridae. There are about five described species in Mesogastrura.

== Species ==
These five species belong to the genus Mesogastrura:

- Mesogastrura boneti (Tarsia in Curia, 1941)^{i c g}
- Mesogastrura coeca Cassagnau, 1959^{i c g}
- Mesogastrura libyca (Caroli, 1914)^{i c g}
- Mesogastrura ojcoviensis (Stach, 1919)^{i c g}
- Mesogastrura tiliophila (Loksa & Rubio, 1966)^{g}

Data sources: i = ITIS, c = Catalogue of Life, g = GBIF, b = Bugguide.net
