= Typhlogastrura =

Scientific classification
- Domain: Eukaryota
- Kingdom: Animalia
- Phylum: Arthropoda
- Class: Collembola
- Order: Poduromorpha
- Family: Hypogastruridae
- Genus: Typhlogastrura; Bonet, 1930

Genus of springtails

Typhlogastrura is a genus of springtails in the family Hypogastruridae. There are about 19 described species in Typhlogastrura.

== Species ==
These 19 species belong to the genus Typhlogastrura:

- Typhlogastrura alabamensis Thibaud, 1975^{i c g}
- Typhlogastrura asymmetrica Christiansen & Wang, 2006^{i c g}
- Typhlogastrura atlantea (Gisin, 1951)^{i c g}
- Typhlogastrura breuili Thibaud, 1967^{i c g}
- Typhlogastrura christianseni Thibaud, 1975^{i c g}
- Typhlogastrura elsarzolae Palacios-Vargas & Thibaud, 1997^{i c g}
- Typhlogastrura fousheensis Christiansen & Wang, 2006^{i c g}
- Typhlogastrura helleri Christiansen & Wang, 2006^{i c g}
- Typhlogastrura korenevskyi Babenko, 1987^{i c g}
- Typhlogastrura mendizabali (Bonet, 1930)^{i c g}
- Typhlogastrura morozovi Babenko, 1987^{i c g}
- Typhlogastrura preobrazhenskyi Babenko, 1987^{i c g}
- Typhlogastrura shtanchevae Abdurakhmanov & Babenko, 1991^{i c g}
- Typhlogastrura steinmanni Christiansen & Wang, 2006^{i c g}
- Typhlogastrura thibaudi Babenko in Babenko, Chernova, Potapov & Stebaeva, 1994^{i c g}
- Typhlogastrura topali (Loksa & Bogojevic, 1967)^{i c g}
- Typhlogastrura unica Christiansen & Wang, 2006^{i c g}
- Typhlogastrura valentini Thibaud, 1966^{i c g}
- Typhlogastrura veracruzana Palacios-Vargas & Thibaud, 1985^{i c g}

Data sources: i = ITIS, c = Catalogue of Life, g = GBIF, b = Bugguide.net
