= Acherontiella =

Scientific classification
- Kingdom: Animalia
- Phylum: Arthropoda
- Clade: Pancrustacea
- Class: Collembola
- Order: Poduromorpha
- Family: Hypogastruridae
- Genus: Acherontiella; Absolon, 1913

Genus of springtails

Acherontiella is a genus of springtails in the family Hypogastruridae. There are at least 20 described species in Acherontiella.

== Species ==
These 20 species belong to the genus Acherontiella:

- Acherontiella aokii Tamura & Yue, 1999^{i c g}
- Acherontiella bougisi Cassagnau & Delamare Deboutteville, 1955^{i c g}
- Acherontiella candida (Delamare Deboutteville, 1952)^{i c g}
- Acherontiella carusoi Dallai, 1978^{i c g}
- Acherontiella cassagnaui Thibaud, 1967^{i c g}
- Acherontiella cavernicola (Tarsia in Curia, 1941)^{i c g}
- Acherontiella colotlipana Palacios-Vargas & Thibaud, 1985^{i c g}
- Acherontiella dentata Djanaschvili, 1971^{i c g}
- Acherontiella epigea Bonet, 1945^{i c g}
- Acherontiella globulata Thibaud & Massoud, 1980^{i c g}
- Acherontiella kowalskiorum Weiner & Najt, 1998^{i c g}
- Acherontiella mac (Palacios-Vargas & Thibaud, 1985)^{i c g}
- Acherontiella massoudi Thibaud, 1963^{i c g}
- Acherontiella onychiuriformis Absolon, 1913^{i c g}
- Acherontiella prominentia Thibaud & Weiner in Najt, & Matile, 1997^{i c g}
- Acherontiella sabina Bonet, 1945^{i c g}
- Acherontiella thai Thibaud, 1990^{i c g}
- Acherontiella thibaudi Barra, 1994^{i c g}
- Acherontiella variabilis Delamare Deboutteville, 1948^{i c g}
- Acherontiella xenylliformis Gisin, 1952^{i c g}

Data sources: i = ITIS, c = Catalogue of Life, g = GBIF, b = Bugguide.net
