= Thibaudylla =

Scientific classification
- Domain: Eukaryota
- Kingdom: Animalia
- Phylum: Arthropoda
- Class: Collembola
- Order: Poduromorpha
- Family: Hypogastruridae
- Genus: Thibaudylla; Najt & Weiner in Najt, & Matile, 1997

Genus of springtails

Thibaudylla is a genus of springtails in the family Hypogastruridae. There are at least four described species in Thibaudylla.

== Species ==
These four species belong to the genus Thibaudylla:

- Thibaudylla anniae (Najt & Weiner, 1991)^{i c g}
- Thibaudylla danieleae (Deharveng & Najt in Tillier, 1988)^{i c g}
- Thibaudylla palpata (Deharveng & Najt in Tillier, 1988)^{i c g}
- Thibaudylla thibaudi (Massoud, 1965)^{i c g}

Data sources: i = ITIS, c = Catalogue of Life, g = GBIF, b = Bugguide.net
