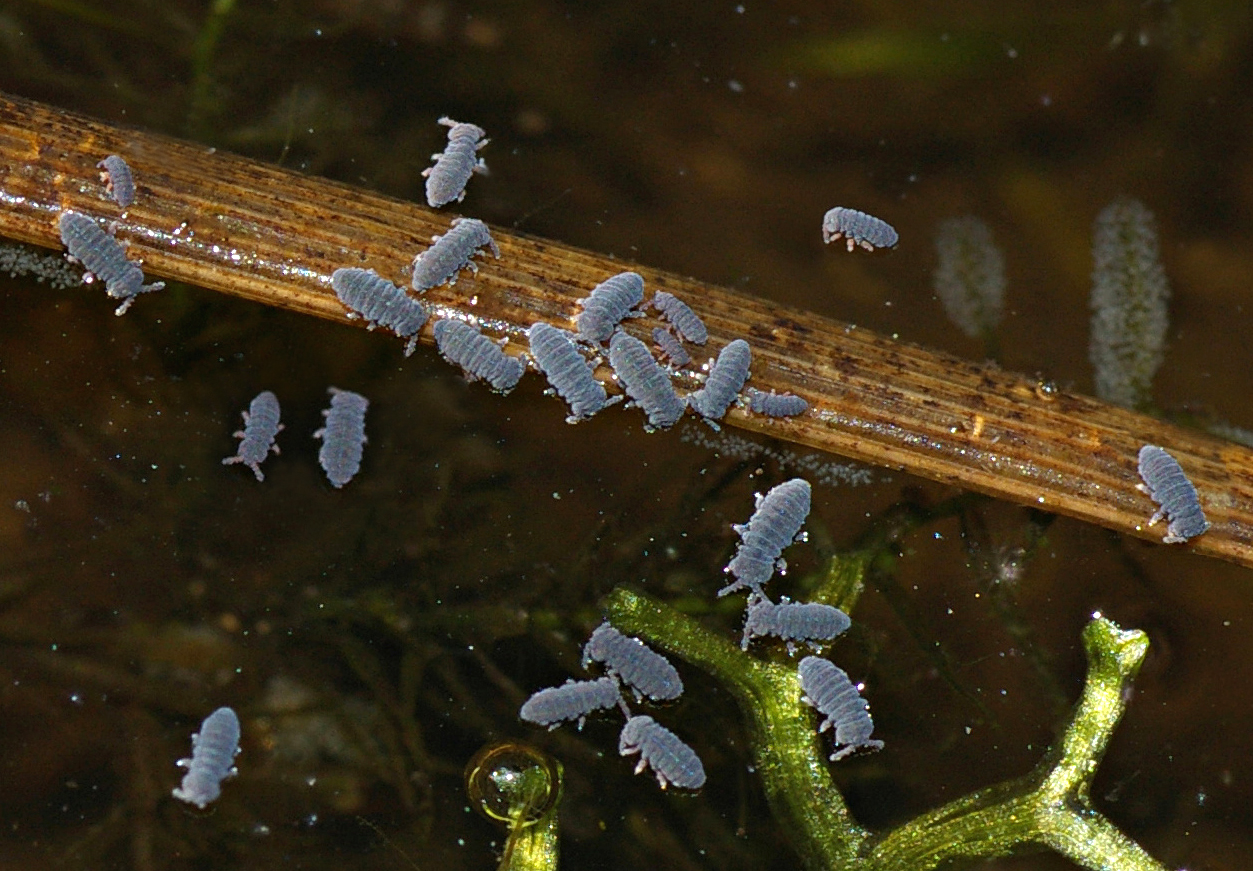

Scientific classification
- Kingdom: Animalia
- Phylum: Arthropoda
- Class: Collembola
- Order: Poduromorpha
- Family: Poduridae
- Genus: Podura
- Species: P. aquatica

Binomial name
- Podura aquatica Linnaeus, 1758

= Podura aquatica =

Species of springtail

Podura aquatica, the water springtail, is a species of springtail, one of only four described species in the family Poduridae. It is an abundant species with a Holarctic distribution.

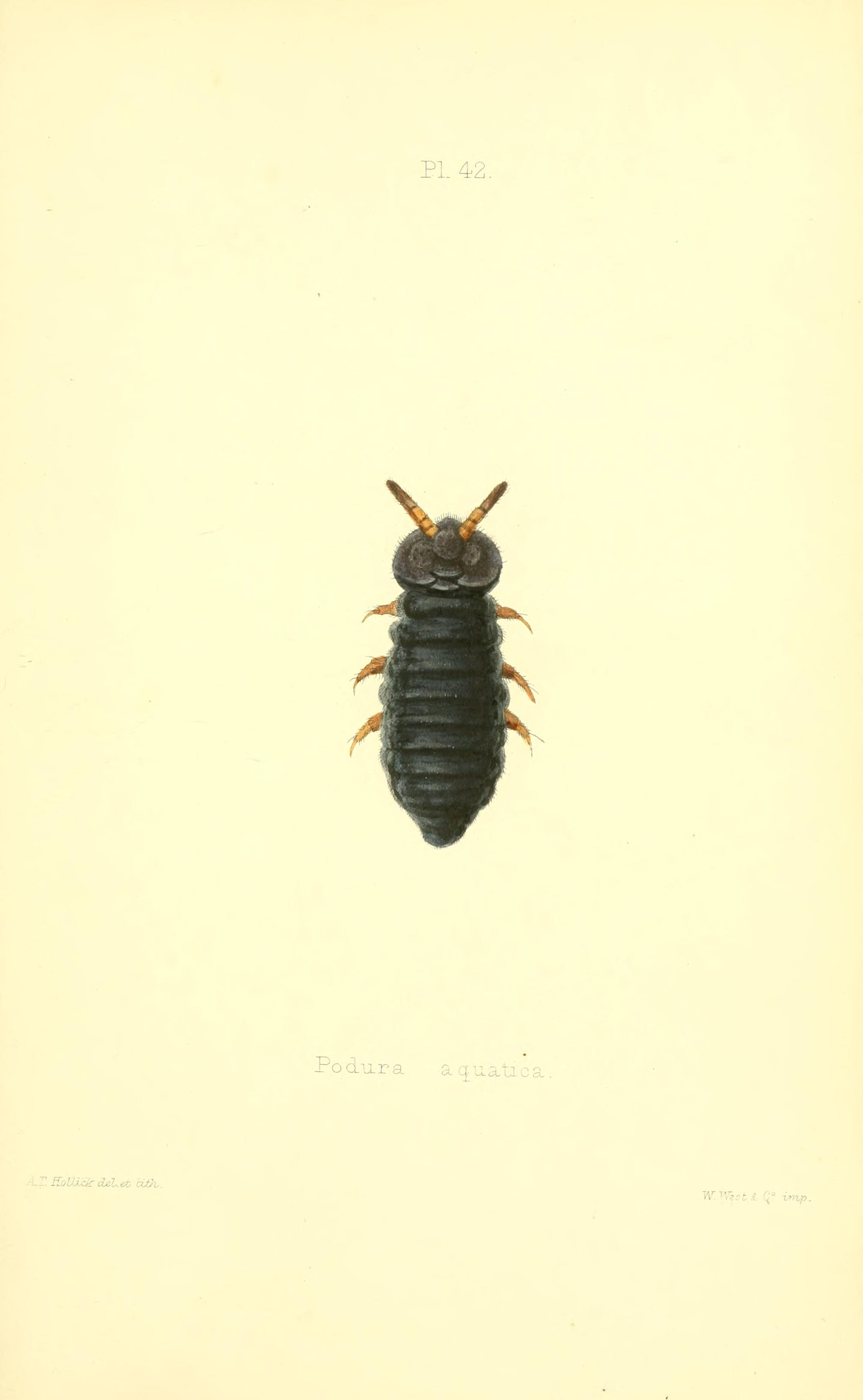
Illustration of P. aquatica.

Adults exhibit positive phototaxis with peak spectral sensitivity in the blue (≈484 nm) and green–yellow (≈570 nm) ranges, and they show strong polarotaxis to horizontally polarized light in the blue range, a cue used to locate suitable water surfaces.

As its common and scientific names suggest, this is an exclusively aquatic species, living its whole life as a scavenger on the surface of all kinds of still water. It is a squat species, up to 1.5 mm in length, and usually bluish grey but sometimes almost black. The furcula is large and flattened, allowing the animal to jump without breaking the surface tension of the water. The species has a longer tail than Hypogastruridae, which are also common springtails in standing water.

P. aquatica deposits eggs on the water surface. The eggs are hydrophilic and immediately sink to the bottom. The embryo develops under water. The hatchling has a hydrophobic cuticle and rises up to the surface to continue its post-embryological development on the water surface. Spermatophores are also deposited on the water's surface.
