= Stenogastrura =

Scientific classification
- Domain: Eukaryota
- Kingdom: Animalia
- Phylum: Arthropoda
- Class: Collembola
- Order: Poduromorpha
- Family: Hypogastruridae
- Genus: Stenogastrura; Christiansen & Bellinger, 1980

Genus of springtails

Stenogastrura is a genus of springtails in the family Hypogastruridae. There is at least one described species in Stenogastrura, S. hiemalis.
