= Ecuadogastrura =

Scientific classification
- Domain: Eukaryota
- Kingdom: Animalia
- Phylum: Arthropoda
- Class: Collembola
- Order: Poduromorpha
- Family: Hypogastruridae
- Genus: Ecuadogastrura; Palacios-Vargas & Thibaud, 2001

Genus of springtails

Ecuadogastrura is a genus of springtails in the family Hypogastruridae. There is at least one described species in Ecuadogastrura, E. trinkleini.
