= Mitchellania =

Scientific classification
- Domain: Eukaryota
- Kingdom: Animalia
- Phylum: Arthropoda
- Class: Collembola
- Order: Poduromorpha
- Family: Hypogastruridae
- Genus: Mitchellania; Wray, 1953

Genus of springtails

Mitchellania is a genus of springtails in the family Hypogastruridae. There are about 15 described species in Mitchellania.

== Species ==
These 15 species belong to the genus Mitchellania:

- Mitchellania alani (Babenko in Babenko, Chernova, Potapov & Stebaeva, 1994)^{i c g}
- Mitchellania californica (Bacon, 1914)^{i c g}
- Mitchellania franzi (Butschek & Gisin, 1949)^{i c g}
- Mitchellania gibbomucronata Hammer, 1953^{i c g}
- Mitchellania hermosa Wray, 1953^{i c g}
- Mitchellania hiawatha (Yosii, 1962)^{i c g}
- Mitchellania horrida (Yosii, 1960)^{i c g}
- Mitchellania hystrix (Handschin, 1924)^{i c g}
- Mitchellania krafti (Scott, 1962)^{i c g}
- Mitchellania loricata (Yosii, 1960)^{i c g}
- Mitchellania pilosa (Yosii, 1956)^{i c g}
- Mitchellania subhorrida (Babenko in Babenko, Chernova, Potapov & Stebaeva, 1994)^{i c g}
- Mitchellania virga (Christiansen & Bellinger, 1980)^{i c g}
- Mitchellania vulgaris (Yosii, 1960)^{i c g}
- Mitchellania wallmoi Fjellberg, 1985^{i c g}

Data sources: i = ITIS, c = Catalogue of Life, g = GBIF, b = Bugguide.net
