= Orogastrura =

Scientific classification
- Domain: Eukaryota
- Kingdom: Animalia
- Phylum: Arthropoda
- Class: Collembola
- Order: Poduromorpha
- Family: Hypogastruridae
- Genus: Orogastrura; Deharveng & Gers, 1979

Genus of springtails

Orogastrura is a genus of springtails in the family Hypogastruridae. There are about eight described species in Orogastrura.

== Species ==
These eight species belong to the genus Orogastrura:

- Orogastrura dilatata (Cassagnau, 1959)^{i c g}
- Orogastrura emucronata Deharveng & Gers, 1979^{i c g}
- Orogastrura fusca Gers, 1981^{i c g}
- Orogastrura octoseta Arbea & Jordana, 1990^{i c g}
- Orogastrura pallida (Cassagnau, 1954)^{i c g}
- Orogastrura parva (Gisin, 1949)^{i c g}
- Orogastrura stebaevae Babenko in Babenko, Chernova, Potapov & Stebaeva, 1994^{i c g}
- Orogastrura tetrophthalma Deharveng, Bedos & Duran, 2015^{g}

Data sources: i = ITIS, c = Catalogue of Life, g = GBIF, b = Bugguide.net
