= Cosberella =

Scientific classification
- Domain: Eukaryota
- Kingdom: Animalia
- Phylum: Arthropoda
- Class: Collembola
- Order: Poduromorpha
- Family: Hypogastruridae
- Genus: Cosberella; Wray, 1963

Genus of springtails

Cosberella is a genus of springtails in the family Hypogastruridae. There are about eight described species in Cosberella.

== Species ==
These eight species belong to the genus Cosberella:

- Cosberella acuminata (Cassagnau, 1952)^{i c g}
- Cosberella arborea (Fjellberg, 1992)^{i c g}
- Cosberella conatoa Wray, 1963^{i c g}
- Cosberella denali (Fjellberg, 1985)^{i c g}
- Cosberella hibernica (Fjellberg, 1987)^{i c g}
- Cosberella lamaralexanderi Bernard, 2006^{i c g}
- Cosberella mendozarum Palacios-Vargas, & Castaño-Meneses, 2019)
- Cosberella navicularis (Schött, 1893)^{i c g}
- Cosberella yoshiana (Babenko, 2000)^{i c g}

Data sources: i = ITIS, c = Catalogue of Life, g = GBIF, b = Bugguide.net
