= Sensiphorura =

Scientific classification
- Domain: Eukaryota
- Kingdom: Animalia
- Phylum: Arthropoda
- Class: Collembola
- Order: Poduromorpha
- Family: Pachytullbergiidae
- Genus: Sensiphorura; Rusek, 1976

Species
- Sensiphorura anichkini Y.B.Shveenkova, 2017; Sensiphorura marshalli Rusek, 1976; Sensiphorura oligoseta Bu, Potapov & Gao, 2013; Sensiphorura spec Rusek, 1976; Sensiphorura tiunovi Y.B.Shveenkova, 2017

Genus of arthropods

Sensiphorura is a genus of springtail in the family Pachytullbergiidae.
