= Willemia =

Scientific classification
- Domain: Eukaryota
- Kingdom: Animalia
- Phylum: Arthropoda
- Class: Collembola
- Order: Poduromorpha
- Family: Hypogastruridae
- Genus: Willemia; Börner, 1901

Genus of springtails

Willemia is a genus of springtails in the family Hypogastruridae. There are at least 40 described species in Willemia.

== Species ==
These 42 species belong to the genus Willemia:

- Willemia annapurna D'Haese & Weiner, 1998^{i c g}
- Willemia anophthalma Börner, 1901^{i c g}
- Willemia arenicola Palacios-Vargas & Vàzquez, 1989^{i c g}
- Willemia arida Fjellberg, 1991^{i c g}
- Willemia aspinata Stach, 1949^{i c g}
- Willemia bedosae D'Haese, 1998^{i c g}
- Willemia bellingeri Palacios-Vargas & Vàzquez, 1989^{i c g}
- Willemia brevispina Hüther, 1962^{i c g}
- Willemia buddenbrocki Hüther, 1959^{i c g}
- Willemia bulbosa Bonet, 1945^{i c g}
- Willemia christianseni D'Haese, 1998^{i c g}
- Willemia deharvengi D'Haese & Weiner, 1998^{i c g}
- Willemia delamarei Prabhoo, 1971^{i c g}
- Willemia denisi Mills, 1932^{i c g}
- Willemia dubia Christiansen & Bellinger, 1980^{i c g}
- Willemia fjellbergi Potapov in Babenko, Chernova, Potapov & Stebaeva, 1994^{i c g}
- Willemia granulata Fjellberg, 1985^{i c g}
- Willemia intermedia Mills, 1934^{i c g}
- Willemia japonica Yosii, 1970^{i c g}
- Willemia koreana Thibaud & Lee, 1994^{i c g}
- Willemia meybholae Palacios-Vargas, 1987^{i c g}
- Willemia multilobata Gers & Deharveng, 1985^{i c g}
- Willemia nadchatrami Yosii, 1959^{i c g}
- Willemia namibiae Thibaud & Massoud, 1988^{i c g}
- Willemia neocaledonica Weiner, 1991^{i c g}
- Willemia nepalensis D'Haese & Weiner, 1998^{i c g}
- Willemia persimilis Bonet, 1945^{i c g}
- Willemia psammophila Palacios & Thibaud, 2001^{i c g}
- Willemia scandinavica Stach, 1949^{i c g}
- Willemia setonychia Prabhoo, 1971^{i c g}
- Willemia shanghaiensis Yue, 1999^{i c g}
- Willemia similis Mills, 1934^{i c g}
- Willemia subbulbosa Thibaud, 1994^{i c g}
- Willemia tali Kaprus & Nevo, 2003^{i c g}
- Willemia tondoh^{g}
- Willemia trilobata Barra, 1995^{i c g}
- Willemia trisphaerae Potapov in Babenko, Chernova, Potapov & Stebaeva, 1994^{i c g}
- Willemia unispina Fjellberg, 2007^{g}
- Willemia virae Kaprus, 1997^{i c g}
- Willemia wandae Tamura & Zhao, 1997^{i c g}
- Willemia zeppelini^{g}
- Willemia zhaoi Tamura, Yin & Weiner, 2000^{i c g}

Data sources: i = ITIS, c = Catalogue of Life, g = GBIF, b = Bugguide.net
