= Podura fuscata =

Scientific classification
- Domain: Eukaryota
- Kingdom: Animalia
- Phylum: Arthropoda
- Class: Collembola
- Order: Poduromorpha
- Family: Poduridae
- Genus: Podura
- Species: †P. fuscata

Binomial name
- †Podura fuscata Koch & Berendt, 1854

Species of springtail

Podura fuscata is a species of springtail in the genus Podura.
