= Schaefferia =

Schaefferia is the scientific name of two genera of organisms and may refer to:

- Schaefferia (plant), a genus of plants in the family Celastraceae
- Schaefferia (springtail), a genus of arthropods in the family Hypogastruridae
