= Acherongia =

Scientific classification
- Kingdom: Animalia
- Phylum: Arthropoda
- Clade: Pancrustacea
- Class: Collembola
- Order: Poduromorpha
- Family: Hypogastruridae
- Genus: Acherongia; Massoud & Thibaud, 1985

Genus of springtails

Acherongia is a genus of springtails in the family Hypogastruridae. There are at least four described species in Acherongia.

== Species ==
These four species belong to the genus Acherongia:

- Acherongia huetheri Fjellberg, 1992^{i c g}
- Acherongia minima Massoud & Thibaud, 1985^{i c g}
- Acherongia palatinensis (Hüther, 1969)^{i c g}
- Acherongia steineri Christian & Thibaud, 1996^{i c g}

Data sources: i = ITIS, c = Catalogue of Life, g = GBIF, b = Bugguide.net
