= Neobeckerella =

Scientific classification
- Domain: Eukaryota
- Kingdom: Animalia
- Phylum: Arthropoda
- Class: Collembola
- Order: Poduromorpha
- Family: Hypogastruridae
- Genus: Neobeckerella; Wray, 1952

Genus of springtails

Neobeckerella is a genus of springtails in the family Hypogastruridae. There is at least one described species in Neobeckerella, N. allusa.
