= Acheroxenylla =

Scientific classification
- Kingdom: Animalia
- Phylum: Arthropoda
- Clade: Pancrustacea
- Class: Collembola
- Order: Poduromorpha
- Family: Hypogastruridae
- Genus: Acheroxenylla; Ellis, 1976

Genus of springtails

Acheroxenylla is a genus of springtails in the family Hypogastruridae. There are at least three described species in Acheroxenylla.

== Species ==
These three species belong to the genus Acheroxenylla:

- Acheroxenylla canariensis Fjellberg, 1992^{i c g}
- Acheroxenylla cretensis Ellis, 1976^{i c g}
- Acheroxenylla furcata Fjellberg, 1992^{i c g}

Data sources: i = ITIS, c = Catalogue of Life, g = GBIF, b = Bugguide.net
