= Denigastrura =

Scientific classification
- Domain: Eukaryota
- Kingdom: Animalia
- Phylum: Arthropoda
- Class: Collembola
- Order: Poduromorpha
- Family: Hypogastruridae
- Genus: Denigastrura; Stach, 1949

Genus of springtails

Denigastrura is a genus of springtails in the family Hypogastruridae. There is at least one described species in Denigastrura, D. tetrophthalma.
