= Jacutogastrura =

Scientific classification
- Kingdom: Animalia
- Phylum: Arthropoda
- Class: Collembola
- Order: Poduromorpha
- Family: Hypogastruridae
- Genus: Jacutogastrura; Martynova, 1981

Genus of springtails

Jacutogastrura is a genus of springtails in the family Hypogastruridae. There is at least one described species in Jacutogastrura, J. silvatica.
