= Beckerella =

Beckerella may refer to:

- Beckerella, a genus of flies in the family Chloropidae, synonym of Trigonomma
- Beckerella, a genus of springtails in the family Hypogastruridae, synonym of Choreutinula
- Beckerella, a genus of algae in the family Gelidiaceae, synonym of Ptilophora
