= Parawillemia =

Scientific classification
- Domain: Eukaryota
- Kingdom: Animalia
- Phylum: Arthropoda
- Class: Collembola
- Order: Poduromorpha
- Family: Hypogastruridae
- Genus: Parawillemia; Izarra, 1975

Genus of springtails

Parawillemia is a genus of springtails in the family Hypogastruridae. There is at least one described species in Parawillemia, P. pampeana.
