= Schoettella =

Scientific classification
- Domain: Eukaryota
- Kingdom: Animalia
- Phylum: Arthropoda
- Class: Collembola
- Order: Poduromorpha
- Family: Hypogastruridae
- Genus: Schoettella; Schäffer, 1896

Genus of springtails

Schoettella is a genus of springtails and allies in the family Hypogastruridae. There are about 13 described species in Schoettella.

== Species ==
- Schoettella alba Folsom, 1932
- Schoettella andina Dìaz & Palacios-Vargas, 1983
- Schoettella celiae Fernandes & de Mendonça, 1998
- Schoettella distincta (Denis, 1931)
- Schoettella glasgowi (Folsom, 1916)
- Schoettella hodgsoni (Carpenter, 1908)
- Schoettella idahoensis (Wray, 1958)
- Schoettella janiae Palacios-Vargas, 1979
- Schoettella novajaniae Palacios-Vargas & Castaño-Meneses, 1998
- Schoettella subcorta Salmon, 1941
- Schoettella tristani (Denis, 1931)
- Schoettella ununguiculata (Tullberg, 1869)
- Schoettella ununguiculatus
