= Octoacanthella =

Scientific classification
- Domain: Eukaryota
- Kingdom: Animalia
- Phylum: Arthropoda
- Class: Collembola
- Order: Poduromorpha
- Family: Hypogastruridae
- Genus: Octoacanthella; Martynova, 1961

Genus of springtails

Octoacanthella is a genus of springtails in the family Hypogastruridae. There is at least one described species in Octoacanthella, O. aethiopica.
