= Ongulogastrura =

Scientific classification
- Domain: Eukaryota
- Kingdom: Animalia
- Phylum: Arthropoda
- Class: Collembola
- Order: Poduromorpha
- Family: Hypogastruridae
- Genus: Ongulogastrura; Thibaud & Massoud, 1983

Genus of springtails

Ongulogastrura is a genus of springtails in the family Hypogastruridae. There is at least one described species in Ongulogastrura, O. longisensilla.
