= Willemgastrura =

Scientific classification
- Domain: Eukaryota
- Kingdom: Animalia
- Phylum: Arthropoda
- Class: Collembola
- Order: Poduromorpha
- Family: Hypogastruridae
- Genus: Willemgastrura; Pereira de Oliveira & Thibaud, 1988

Genus of springtails

Willemgastrura is a genus of springtails in the family Hypogastruridae. There is at least one described species in Willemgastrura, W. coeca.
