= Pseudacherontides =

Scientific classification
- Domain: Eukaryota
- Kingdom: Animalia
- Phylum: Arthropoda
- Class: Collembola
- Order: Poduromorpha
- Family: Hypogastruridae
- Genus: Pseudacherontides; Djanaschvili, 1971

Genus of springtails

Pseudacherontides is a genus of springtails in the family Hypogastruridae. There are about nine described species in Pseudacherontides.

== Species ==
These nine species belong to the genus Pseudacherontides:

- Pseudacherontides aspinatus (Stach, 1959)^{i c}
- Pseudacherontides bisetosus (Stach, 1959)^{i c g}
- Pseudacherontides bulgaricus (Martynova & al., 1971)^{i c g}
- Pseudacherontides crassus (Stach, 1959)^{i c g}
- Pseudacherontides edaphicus (Yosii, 1971)^{i c g}
- Pseudacherontides spelaeus (Ionesco, 1922)^{i c g}
- Pseudacherontides stachi (Ljovushkin, 1972)^{i c g}
- Pseudacherontides vivax (Yosii, 1956)^{i c g}
- Pseudacherontides zenkevitchi Djanaschvili, 1971^{i c g}

Data sources: i = ITIS, c = Catalogue of Life, g = GBIF, b = Bugguide.net
