= Paraxenylla =

Scientific classification
- Domain: Eukaryota
- Kingdom: Animalia
- Phylum: Arthropoda
- Class: Collembola
- Order: Poduromorpha
- Family: Hypogastruridae
- Genus: Paraxenylla; Murphy, 1965

Genus of springtails

Paraxenylla is a genus of springtails in the family Hypogastruridae. There are about 10 described species in Paraxenylla.

== Species ==
These 10 species belong to the genus Paraxenylla:

- Paraxenylla affiniformis (Stach, 1930)^{i c g}
- Paraxenylla arenosa (Uchida & Tamura, 1967)^{i c g}
- Paraxenylla cubana Palacios-Vargas & Janssens, 2006^{i c g}
- Paraxenylla lapazana Palacios-Vargas & Vàzquez, 1989^{i c g}
- Paraxenylla mangle (Murphy, 1965)^{i c g}
- Paraxenylla norvegica Fjellberg, 2010^{g}
- Paraxenylla oceanica (Yosii, 1960)^{i c g}
- Paraxenylla peruensis Palacios-Vargas & Janssens, 2006^{i c g}
- Paraxenylla piloua Thibaud & Weiner in Najt, & Matile, 1997^{i c g}
- Paraxenylla sooretamensis^{g}

Data sources: i = ITIS, c = Catalogue of Life, g = GBIF, b = Bugguide.net
