= Microgastrura =

Scientific classification
- Domain: Eukaryota
- Kingdom: Animalia
- Phylum: Arthropoda
- Class: Collembola
- Order: Poduromorpha
- Family: Hypogastruridae
- Genus: Microgastrura; Stach, 1922

Genus of springtails

Microgastrura is a genus of springtails in the family Hypogastruridae. There are about seven described species in Microgastrura.

== Species ==
These seven species belong to the genus Microgastrura:

- Microgastrura duodecimoculata Stach, 1922^{i c g}
- Microgastrura jamaicensis (Massoud & Bellinger, 1963)^{i c g}
- Microgastrura massoudi Deharveng & Najt in Tillier, 1988^{i c g}
- Microgastrura minutissima (Mills, 1934)^{i c g}
- Microgastrura nanacatlica Vàzquez & Palacios-Vargas, 1997^{i c g}
- Microgastrura sensiliata Jordana, 1981^{i c g}
- Microgastrura sofiae Vàzquez & Palacios-Vargas, 1997^{i c g}

Data sources: i = ITIS, c = Catalogue of Life, g = GBIF, b = Bugguide.net
