= Mesachorutes =

Scientific classification
- Domain: Eukaryota
- Kingdom: Animalia
- Phylum: Arthropoda
- Class: Collembola
- Order: Poduromorpha
- Family: Hypogastruridae
- Genus: Mesachorutes; Absolon, 1900

Genus of springtails

Mesachorutes is a genus of springtails in the family Hypogastruridae. There are at least two described species in Mesachorutes.

== Species ==
These two species belong to the genus Mesachorutes:

- Mesachorutes quadriocellatus Absolon, 1900^{i c g}
- Mesachorutes thomomys (Chamberlain, 1943)^{i c g}

Data sources: i = ITIS, c = Catalogue of Life, g = GBIF, b = Bugguide.net
