= Barbagastrura =

Scientific classification
- Domain: Eukaryota
- Kingdom: Animalia
- Phylum: Arthropoda
- Class: Collembola
- Order: Poduromorpha
- Family: Hypogastruridae
- Genus: Barbagastrura; Massoud, Najt & Thibaud, 1975

Genus of springtails

Barbagastrura is a genus of springtails in the family Hypogastruridae. There is at least one described species in Barbagastrura, B. palpigera.
