= Austrogastrura =

Scientific classification
- Domain: Eukaryota
- Kingdom: Animalia
- Phylum: Arthropoda
- Class: Collembola
- Order: Poduromorpha
- Family: Hypogastruridae
- Genus: Austrogastrura; Thibaud & Palacios-Vargas, 1999

Genus of springtails

Austrogastrura is a genus of springtails in the family Hypogastruridae. There are at least three described species in Austrogastrura.

== Species ==
These three species belong to the genus Austrogastrura:

- Austrogastrura lobata (Yosii, 1959)^{i c g}
- Austrogastrura marambaia^{g}
- Austrogastrura travassosi (Arlè, 1939)^{i c g}

Data sources: i = ITIS, c = Catalogue of Life, g = GBIF, b = Bugguide.net
