= Xenyllogastrura =

Scientific classification
- Kingdom: Animalia
- Phylum: Arthropoda
- Class: Collembola
- Order: Poduromorpha
- Family: Hypogastruridae
- Genus: Xenyllogastrura; Denis, 1932

Genus of springtails

Xenyllogastrura is a genus of springtails in the family Hypogastruridae. There are about eight described species in Xenyllogastrura.

== Species ==
These eight species belong to the genus Xenyllogastrura:

- Xenyllogastrura affinis (Steiner, 1955)^{i c g}
- Xenyllogastrura afurcata Deharveng & Gers, 1979^{i c g}
- Xenyllogastrura arenaria Fjellberg, 1992^{i c g}
- Xenyllogastrura octoculata (Steiner, 1955)^{i c g}
- Xenyllogastrura pruvoti Denis, 1932^{i c g}
- Xenyllogastrura reducta Fjellberg, 1992^{i c g}
- Xenyllogastrura steineri Jordana & Arbea, 1992^{i c g}
- Xenyllogastrura venezueliensis Thibaud & Diaz, 1998^{i c g}

Data sources: i = ITIS, c = Catalogue of Life, g = GBIF, b = Bugguide.net
