= Bonetogastrura =

Scientific classification
- Domain: Eukaryota
- Kingdom: Animalia
- Phylum: Arthropoda
- Class: Collembola
- Order: Poduromorpha
- Family: Hypogastruridae
- Genus: Bonetogastrura; Thibaud, 1974

Genus of springtails

Bonetogastrura is a genus of springtails in the family Hypogastruridae. There are about seven described species in Bonetogastrura.

== Species ==
These seven species belong to the genus Bonetogastrura:

- Bonetogastrura balazuci (Delamare Deboutteville, 1951)^{i c g}
- Bonetogastrura delhezi (Stomp & Thibaud, 1974)^{i c g}
- Bonetogastrura nivalis (Martynova, 1973)^{i c g}
- Bonetogastrura soulensis Thibaud, 1975^{i c g}
- Bonetogastrura spelicola (Gisin, 1964)^{i c g}
- Bonetogastrura subterranea (Carl, 1906)^{i c g}
- Bonetogastrura variabilis (Christiansen, 1951)^{i c g}

Data sources: i = ITIS, c = Catalogue of Life, g = GBIF, b = Bugguide.net
