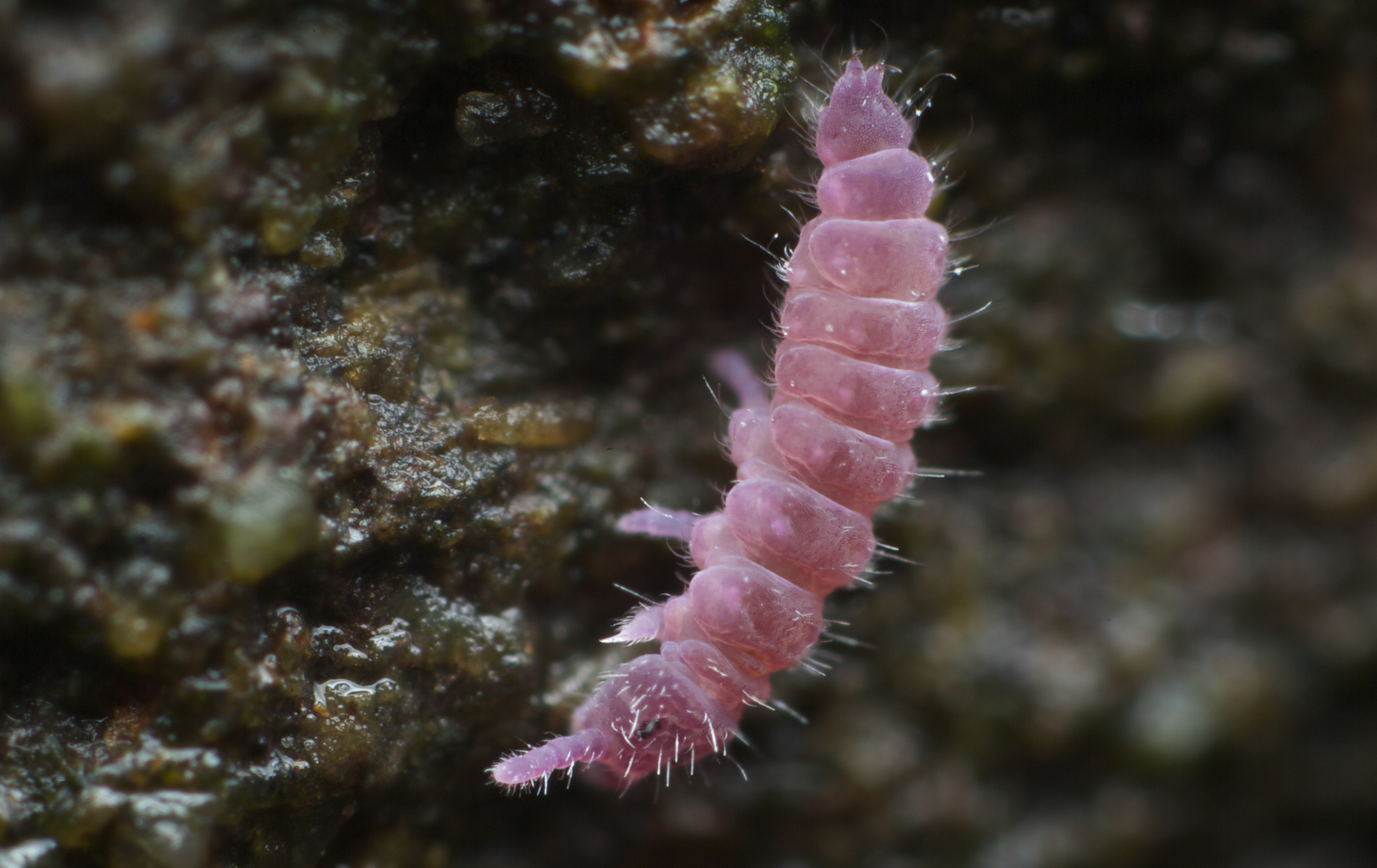

Scientific classification
- Domain: Eukaryota
- Kingdom: Animalia
- Phylum: Arthropoda
- Class: Collembola
- Order: Poduromorpha
- Family: Hypogastruridae
- Genus: Triacanthella; Schäffer, 1897

= Triacanthella =

Genus of springtails

Triacanthella is a genus of springtails in the family Hypogastruridae. There are at least 20 described species in Triacanthella.

== Species ==
These 22 species belong to the genus Triacanthella:

- Triacanthella alba Carpenter, 1909^{i c g}
- Triacanthella andina Cassagnau & Rapoport, 1962^{i c g}
- Triacanthella biroi Stach, 1924^{i c g}
- Triacanthella clavata (Willem, 1902)^{i c g}
- Triacanthella copelandi (Wray, 1963)^{i c g}
- Triacanthella enderbyensis Salmon, 1949^{i c g}
- Triacanthella frigida Cassagnau, 1959^{i c g}
- Triacanthella intermedia Dunger & Zivadinovic, 1984^{i c g}
- Triacanthella massoudi Najt, 1973^{i c g}
- Triacanthella michaelseni Schäffer, 1897^{i c g}
- Triacanthella najtae Izarra, 1971^{i c g}
- Triacanthella nivalis Cassagnau & Deharveng, 1974^{i c g}
- Triacanthella perfecta Denis, 1926^{i c g}
- Triacanthella purpurea Salmon, 1943^{i c g}
- Triacanthella rosea Wahlgren, 1906^{i c g}
- Triacanthella rubra Salmon, 1941^{i c g}
- Triacanthella setacea Salmon, 1941^{i c g}
- Triacanthella sorenseni Salmon, 1949^{i c g}
- Triacanthella terrasilvatica Salmon, 1943^{i c g}
- Triacanthella travei Cassagnau & Deharveng, 1974^{i c g}
- Triacanthella violacea Womersley, 1939^{i c g}
- Triacanthella vogeli Weiner & Najt, 1997^{i c g}

Data sources: i = ITIS, c = Catalogue of Life, g = GBIF, b = Bugguide.net
