= Biscoia =

Scientific classification
- Domain: Eukaryota
- Kingdom: Animalia
- Phylum: Arthropoda
- Class: Collembola
- Order: Poduromorpha
- Family: Hypogastruridae
- Genus: Biscoia; Salmon, 1962

Genus of springtails

Biscoia is a genus of springtails in the family Hypogastruridae. There is at least one described species in Biscoia, B. sudpolaris.
