= Celegastrura =

Scientific classification
- Domain: Eukaryota
- Kingdom: Animalia
- Phylum: Arthropoda
- Class: Collembola
- Order: Poduromorpha
- Family: Hypogastruridae
- Genus: Celegastrura; Palacios-Vargas, Mendoza & Villalobos, 2000

Genus of springtails

Celegastrura is a genus of springtails in the family Hypogastruridae. There is at least one described species in Celegastrura, C. aldebaranis.
