= Schaefferia (springtail) =

Scientific classification
- Domain: Eukaryota
- Kingdom: Animalia
- Phylum: Arthropoda
- Class: Collembola
- Order: Poduromorpha
- Family: Hypogastruridae
- Genus: Schaefferia; Absolon, 1900

Genus of springtails

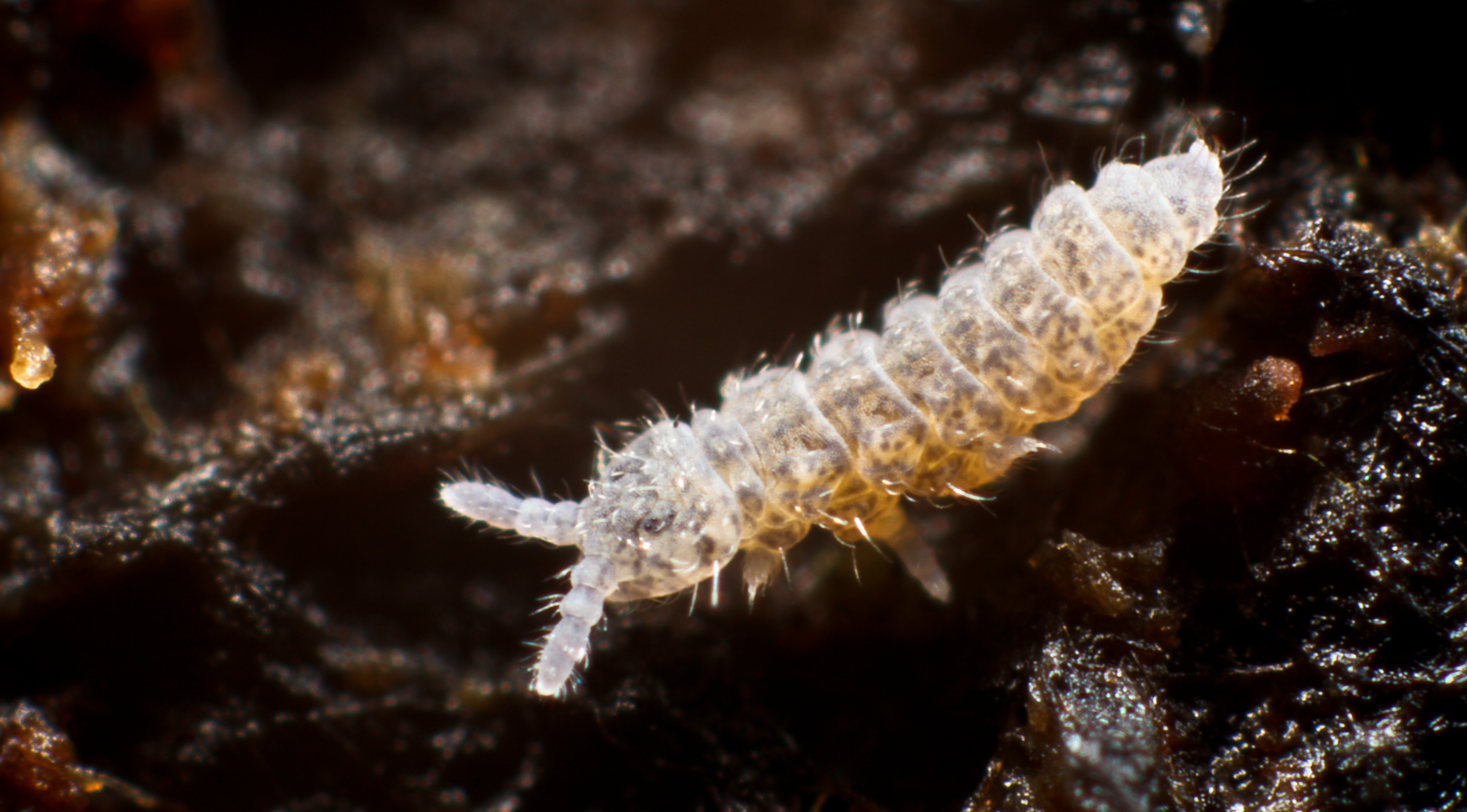
Schaefferia emucronata

Schaefferia is a genus of springtails in the family Hypogastruridae. There are at least 20 described species in Schaefferia.

== Species ==
These 28 species belong to the genus Schaefferia:

- Schaefferia ariegica Cassagnau, 1959^{i c g}
- Schaefferia baschkirica Kniss, 1985^{i c g}
- Schaefferia bidentata (Cassagnau, 1954)^{i c g}
- Schaefferia canigouensis Deharveng & Thibaud, 1980^{i c g}
- Schaefferia cassagnaui Salmon, 1964^{i c g}
- Schaefferia coeca Cassagnau, 1959^{i c g}
- Schaefferia decemoculata (Stach, 1939)^{i c g}
- Schaefferia deharvengi (Jordana & Arbea, 1990)^{i c g}
- Schaefferia duodecimocellata Bonet, 1945^{i c g b}
- Schaefferia duodecimoculata (Steiner, 1955)^{i c g}
- Schaefferia elegans (Cassagnau, 1959)^{g}
- Schaefferia emucronata Absolon, 1900^{i c g}
- Schaefferia fukugakuchiana (Yosii, 1956)^{i c g}
- Schaefferia guerrerensis (Bonet, 1945)^{i c g}
- Schaefferia hubbardi Thibaud, 1995^{i c g}
- Schaefferia jarae (Jordana & Arbea, 1990)^{i c g}
- Schaefferia kitakamiana Yosii, 1991^{i c g}
- Schaefferia lindbergi da Gama, 1963^{i c g}
- Schaefferia maxima Deharveng & Thibaud, 1980^{i c g}
- Schaefferia oaxacana Palacios-Vargas & Thibaud, 1985^{i g}
- Schaefferia oculea Babenko, 1999^{i c g}
- Schaefferia pouadensis Delamare Deboutteville, 1945^{i c g}
- Schaefferia profundissima Jordana & Baquero, 2012^{c g}
- Schaefferia quadrioculata (Stach, 1939)^{i c g}
- Schaefferia quinqueoculata (Yosii, 1956)^{i c g}
- Schaefferia scossirolii Dallai & Sabatini, 1981^{i c g}
- Schaefferia sexoculata (Gisin, 1947)^{i c g}
- Schaefferia subcoeca Deharveng & Thibaud, 1980^{i c g}
- Schaefferia willemi (Bonet, 1930)^{i c g}

Data sources: i = ITIS, c = Catalogue of Life, g = GBIF, b = Bugguide.net
