= Paleotullbergia =

Scientific classification
- Domain: Eukaryota
- Kingdom: Animalia
- Phylum: Arthropoda
- Class: Collembola
- Order: Poduromorpha
- Superfamily: Hypogastruroidea
- Family: Paleotullbergiidae
- Genus: Paleotullbergia; Deboutteville, 1951
- Species: P. primigenia

Binomial name
- Paleotullbergia primigenia Deboutteville, 1951

Genus of springtails

Paleotullbergia is a genus of springtails in the family Paleotullbergiidae, the sole genus of the family. Its only species is Paleotullbergia primigenia, found in Africa.
