= Choreutinula =

Scientific classification
- Domain: Eukaryota
- Kingdom: Animalia
- Phylum: Arthropoda
- Class: Collembola
- Order: Poduromorpha
- Family: Hypogastruridae
- Genus: Choreutinula; Paclt, 1944

Genus of springtails

Choreutinula is a genus of springtails in the family Hypogastruridae. There are about five described species in Choreutinula.

== Species ==
These five species belong to the genus Choreutinula:

- Choreutinula alpina Babenko in Babenko, Chernova, Potapov & Stebaeva, 1994^{i c g}
- Choreutinula gauquelini Gers & Deharveng, 1985^{i c g}
- Choreutinula inermis (Tullberg, 1871)^{i c g}
- Choreutinula kulla Fjellberg, 2007^{g}
- Choreutinula nodiseta (Handschin, 1928)^{i c g}

Data sources: i = ITIS, c = Catalogue of Life, g = GBIF, b = Bugguide.net
