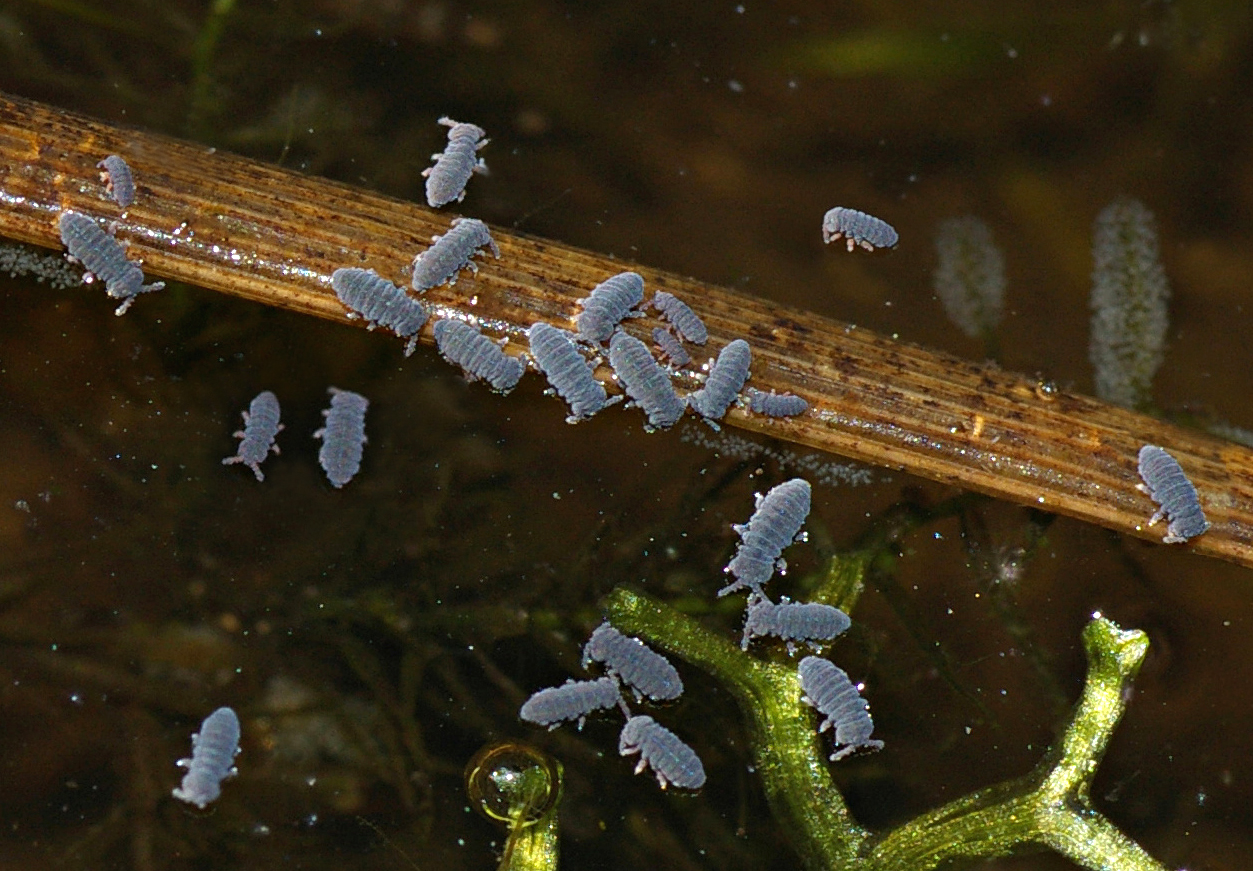
- Podura aquatica

Scientific classification
- Kingdom: Animalia
- Phylum: Arthropoda
- Class: Collembola
- Order: Poduromorpha
- Superfamily: Poduroidea; Latreille, 1804
- Family: Poduridae; Latreille, 1804
- Genus: Podura; Linnaeus, 1758

Type species
- Podura aquatica Linnaeus, 1758

= Podura =

Genus of springtails

Poduridae is a small family of stout-bodied springtails containing only the single genus Podura, and making up the monotypic superfamily Poduroidea. The genus contains four species:

- Podura aquatica Linnaeus, 1758
- Podura infernalis Motschulski, 1850
- † Podura fuscata Koch & Berendt, 1854
- † Podura pulchra Koch & Berendt, 1854
