= Gulgastrura =

Scientific classification
- Domain: Eukaryota
- Kingdom: Animalia
- Phylum: Arthropoda
- Class: Collembola
- Family: Gulgastruridae
- Genus: Gulgastrura; Yosii, 1966
- Species: G. reticulosa

Binomial name
- Gulgastrura reticulosa Yosii, 1966

Genus of springtails

Gulgastrura is a genus of springtails in the family Gulgastruridae. It is the sole genus of the family Gulgastruridae, and Gulgastrura reticulosa is its only species. It was discovered in 1966, in a limestone cave in Korea.
