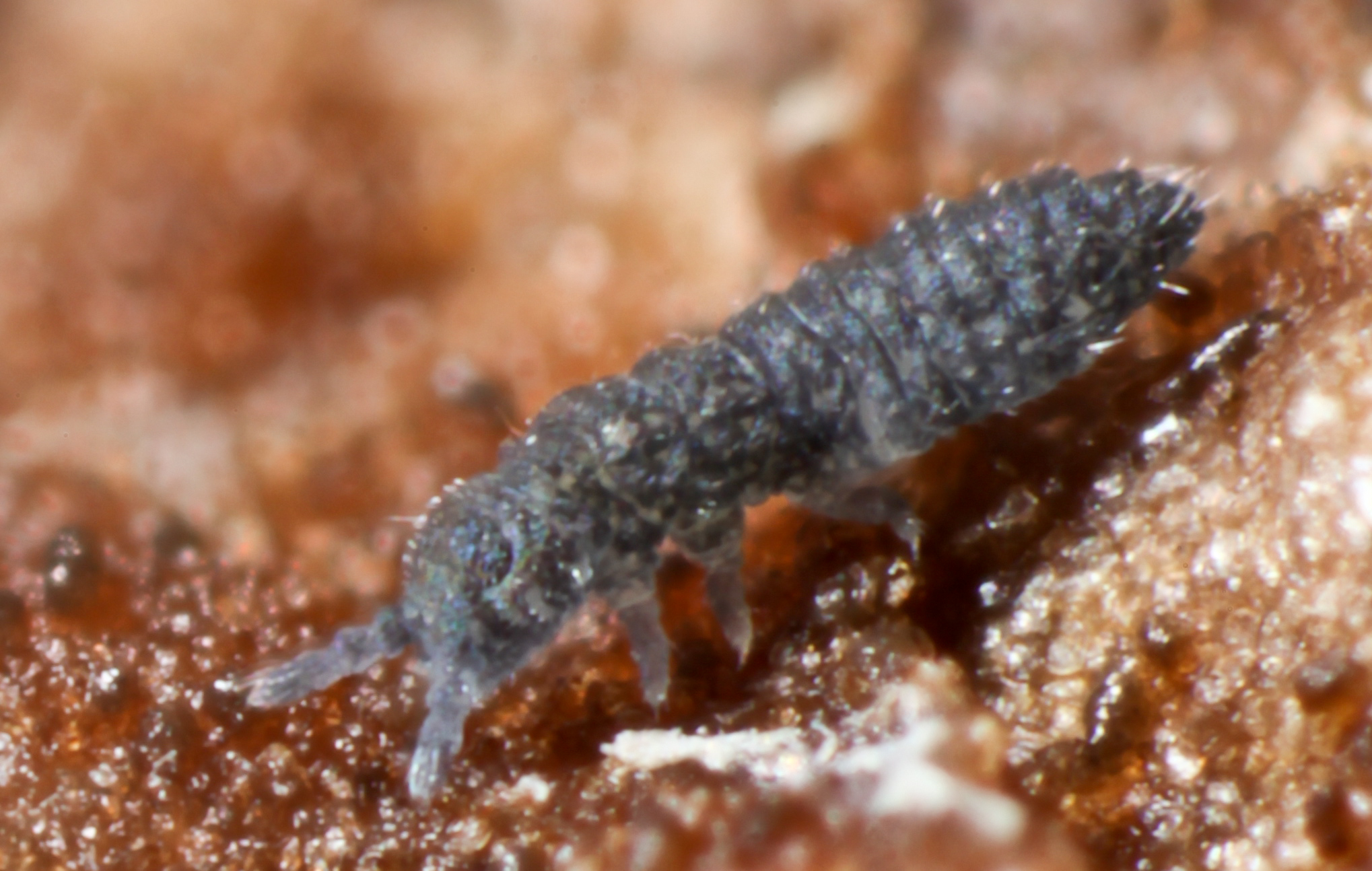
- Xenylla grisea

Scientific classification
- Kingdom: Animalia
- Phylum: Arthropoda
- Class: Collembola
- Order: Poduromorpha
- Family: Hypogastruridae
- Genus: Xenylla; Tullberg, 1869

= Xenylla =

Genus of springtails

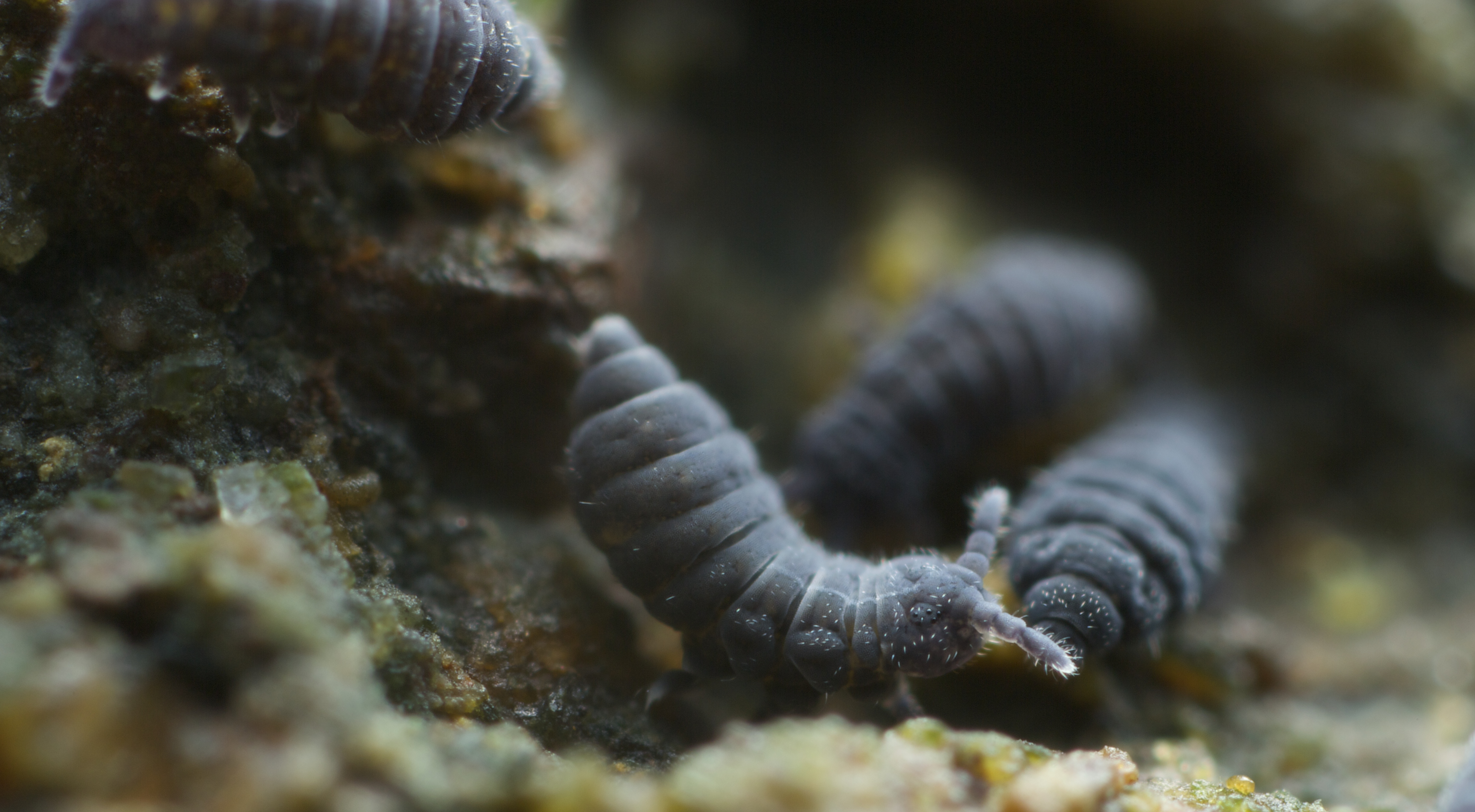
Xenylla littoralis, northeast coast of Tasmania

Xenylla is a genus of springtails and allies in the family Hypogastruridae. There are at least 120 described species in Xenylla.

== See also ==
- List of Xenylla species
