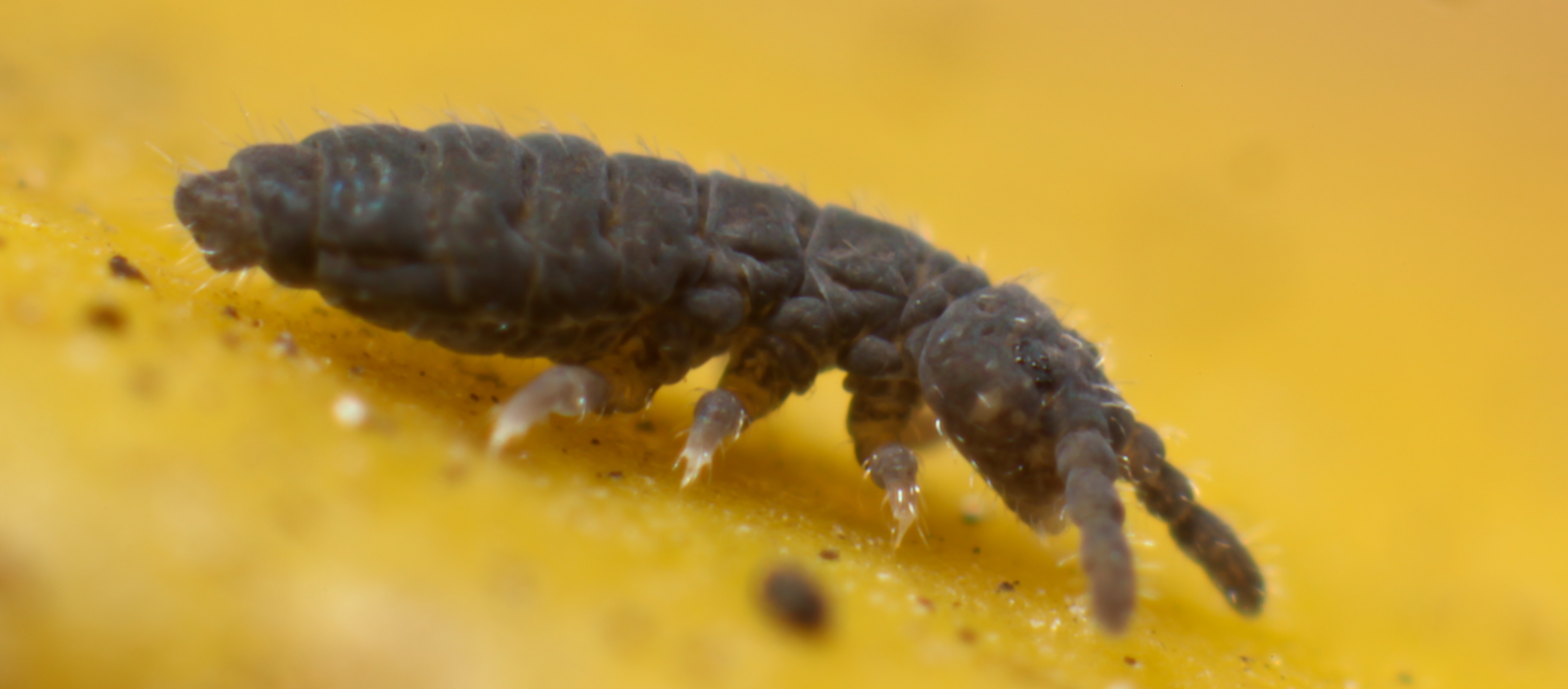
- Hypogastrura viatica

Scientific classification
- Kingdom: Animalia
- Phylum: Arthropoda
- Class: Collembola
- Order: Poduromorpha
- Family: Hypogastruridae
- Genus: Hypogastrura; Bourlet, 1839

= Hypogastrura =

Genus of springtails

Hypogastrura is a genus of springtails in the family Hypogastruridae. There are at least 150 described species in the genus. Their name means ‘lack of a stomach tail’.

== See also ==
- List of Hypogastrura species
