= Pachytullbergiidae =

Scientific classification
- Kingdom: Animalia
- Phylum: Arthropoda
- Clade: Pancrustacea
- Class: Collembola
- Order: Poduromorpha
- Superfamily: Onychiuroidea
- Family: Pachytullbergiidae; Stach, 1954

Family of springtails

Pachytullbergiidae is a family of springtails in the order Poduromorpha. There are at least two genera and four described species in Pachytullbergiidae.

== Genera ==
These two genera belong to the family Pachytullbergiidae:

- Pachytullbergia Bonet, 1947
- Sensiphorura Rusek, 1976
