= Isotogastrura =

Scientific classification
- Kingdom: Animalia
- Phylum: Arthropoda
- Clade: Pancrustacea
- Subphylum: Hexapoda
- Class: Collembola
- Family: Isotogastruridae
- Genus: Isotogastrura; Thibaud & Najt, 1992

Species
- see § Species

Genus of springtails

Isotogastrura is a genus of springtails in the family Isotogastruridae, the only genus of the family. There are at least 10 described species in Isotogastrura.

== Species ==
These species belong to the genus Isotogastrura:

- Isotogastrura ahuizotli Palacios-Vargas & Thibaud, 1998
- Isotogastrura arenicola Thibaud & Najt, 1992
- Isotogastrura atuberculata Palacios-Vargas & Thibaud, 2001
- Isotogastrura coronata Fjellberg, 1995
- Isotogastrura litoralis Thibaud & Weiner, 1997
- Isotogastrura madagascariensis Thibaud, 2008
- Isotogastrura mucrospatulata Palacios-Vargas, de Lima, & Zeppelini, 2013
- Isotogastrura praiana da Silveira, de Mendonça, & Da-Silva, 2014
- Isotogastrura trichaetosa Potapov, Bu, & Gao, 2011
- Isotogastrura veracruzana Palacios-Vargas & Thibaud, 1998
