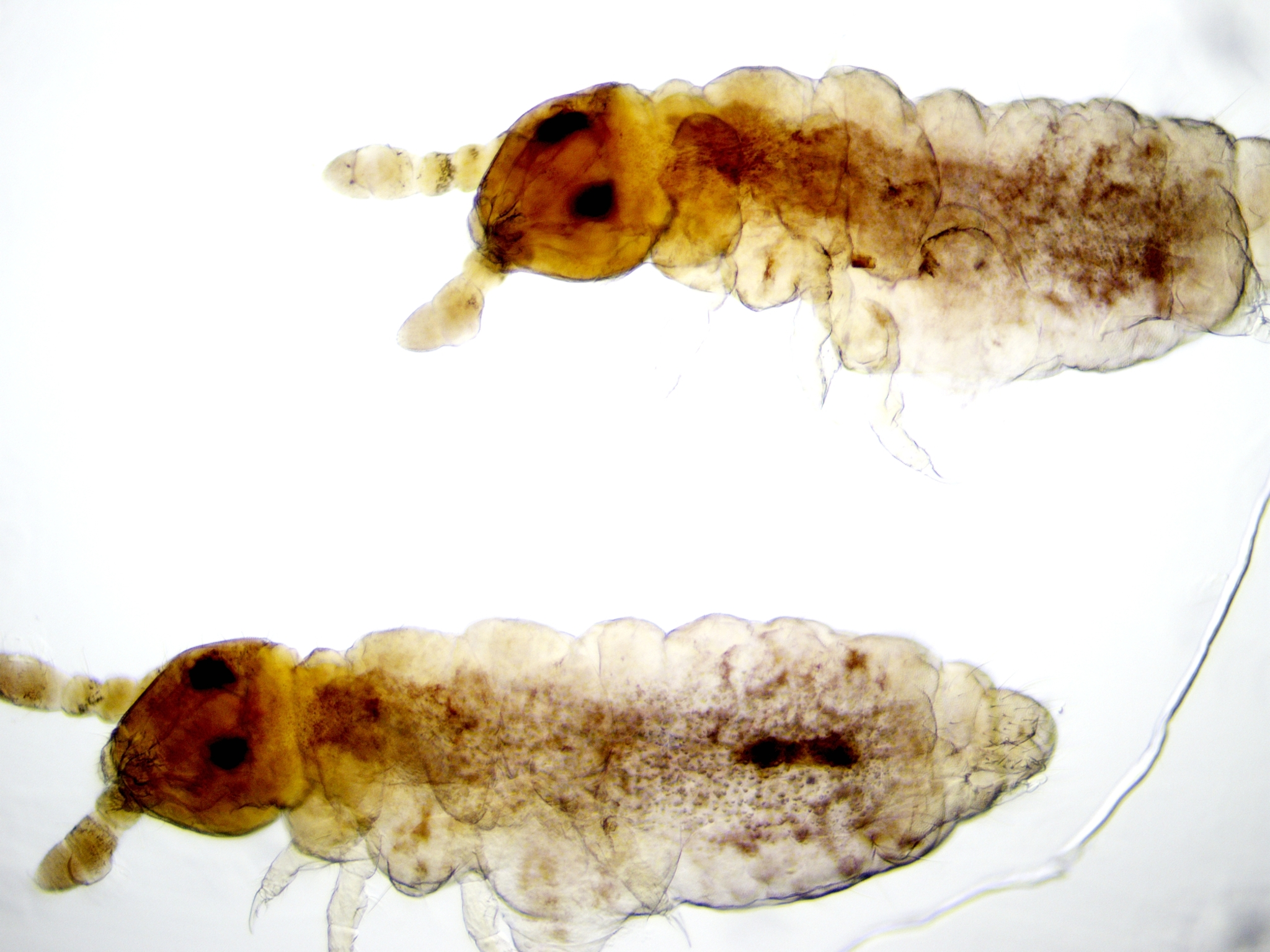
- Ceratophysella denticulata

Scientific classification
- Kingdom: Animalia
- Phylum: Arthropoda
- Class: Collembola
- Order: Poduromorpha
- Family: Hypogastruridae
- Genus: Ceratophysella; Börner in Brohmer, 1932

= Ceratophysella =

Genus of springtails

Ceratophysella is a genus of springtails and allies in the family Hypogastruridae. There are at least 100 described species in Ceratophysella.

== See also ==
- List of Ceratophysella species
