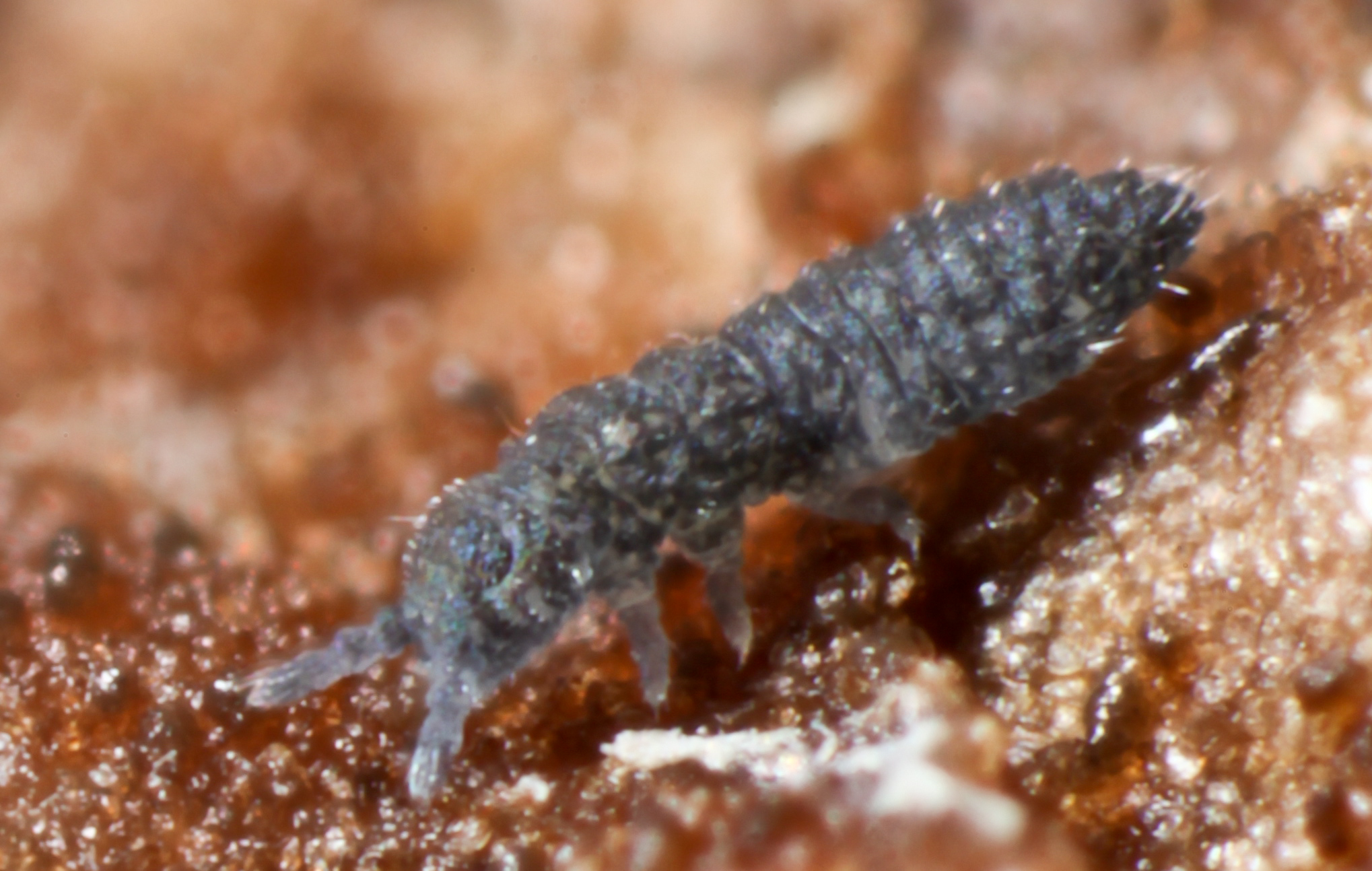
- Xenylla grisea

Scientific classification
- Domain: Eukaryota
- Kingdom: Animalia
- Phylum: Arthropoda
- Class: Collembola
- Order: Poduromorpha
- Family: Hypogastruridae; Börner, 1906

= Hypogastruridae =

Family of springtails

Hypogastruridae is a family of springtails. Members of the family are common and widespread with a cosmopolitan distribution of about 660 species in about 40 genera.

== Selected genera ==
These 43 genera belong to the family Hypogastruridae:

- Acherongia Massoud & Thibaud, 1985^{i c g}
- Acherontides Bonet, 1945^{i c g}
- Acherontiella Absolon, 1913^{i c g}
- Acheroxenylla Ellis, 1976^{i c g}
- Achorutes^{g}
- Austrogastrura Thibaud & Palacios-Vargas, 1999^{i c g}
- Barbagastrura Massoud, Najt & Thibaud, 1975^{i c g}
- Biscoia Salmon, 1962^{i c g}
- Bonetogastrura Thibaud, 1974^{i c g}
- Celegastrura Palacios-Vargas, Mendoza & Villalobos, 2000^{i c g}
- Ceratophysella Börner in Brohmer, 1932^{i c g b}
- Chinogastrura Rusek, 1967^{g}
- Choreutinula Paclt, 1944^{i c g}
- Cosberella Wray, 1963^{i c g}
- Denigastrura Stach, 1949^{i c g}
- Ecuadogastrura Palacios-Vargas & Thibaud, 2001^{i c g}
- Gnathogastrura Dìaz & Najt, 1983^{i c g}
- Hypogastrura Bourlet, 1839^{i c g b}
- Jacutogastrura Martynova, 1981^{i c g}
- Kodiakia^{g}
- Mesachorutes Absolon, 1900^{i c g}
- Mesogastrura Bonet, 1930^{i c g}
- Microgastrura Stach, 1922^{i c g}
- Mitchellania Wray, 1953^{i c g}
- Neobeckerella Wray, 1952^{i c g}
- Octoacanthella Martynova, 1961^{i c g}
- Ongulogastrura Thibaud & Massoud, 1983^{i c g}
- Orogastrura Deharveng & Gers, 1979^{i c g}
- Parawillemia Izarra, 1975^{i c g}
- Paraxenylla Murphy, 1965^{i c g}
- Pseudacherontides Djanaschvili, 1971^{i c g}
- Schaefferia Absolon, 1900^{i c g b}
- Schoettella Schäffer, 1896^{i c g b}
- Stenogastrura Christiansen & Bellinger, 1980^{i c g}
- Tafallia Bonet, 1947^{i c g}
- Taurogastrura Vargovitsh, 2007^{g}
- Thibaudylla Najt & Weiner in Najt, & Matile, 1997^{i c g}
- Triacanthella Schäffer, 1897^{i c g}
- Typhlogastrura Bonet, 1930^{i c g}
- Willemgastrura Pereira de Oliveira & Thibaud, 1988^{i c g}
- Willemia Börner, 1901^{i c g}
- Xenylla Tullberg, 1869^{i c g b}
- Xenyllogastrura Denis, 1932^{i c g}

Data sources: i = ITIS, c = Catalogue of Life, g = GBIF, b = Bugguide.net
