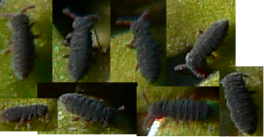
- Podura aquatica (Poduridae)

Scientific classification
- Kingdom: Animalia
- Phylum: Arthropoda
- Clade: Pancrustacea
- Class: Collembola
- Order: Poduromorpha

Superfamilies
- Gulgastruroidea; Hypogastruroidea; Isotogastruroidea; Neanuroidea; Onychiuroidea; Poduroidea

= Poduromorpha =

Order of springtails

The order Poduromorpha is one of the three main groups of springtails (Collembola), tiny hexapods related to insects. This group was formerly treated as a superfamily Poduroidea.

They can be best distinguished from the other springtail groups by their body shape. The Symphypleona are very round animals, almost spherical and the abdominal segments are not visible. Both Entomobryomorpha and Poduromorpha are long springtails with six visible abdominal segments. While Entomobryomorpha have the first thorax segment reduced, Poduromorpha retain all three. The Poduromorpha also tend to have short legs and a plump body, but more oval in shape than the Symphypleona. Their name means 'foot tail formed', deriving from their short, flat, furcula.

== Systematics ==
The Poduromorpha were, as Poduroidea, united with the Entomobryomorpha (then called Entomobryoidea) in a group called "Arthropleona", but this has more recently turned out to be paraphyletic. Actually the Entomobryomorpha, the Poduromorpha, and the third springtail lineage – the Symphypleona – are equally distinct from each other. Their treatment at equal taxonomic rank reflects this. Their rank has also varied a bit. When the springtails were still believed to be an order of insects, the "Arthropleona" and the Symphypleona were treated as suborders.

=== List of families ===
Includes fossil families.

Superfamily Neanuroidea

- Family Brachystomellidae
- Family Neanuridae

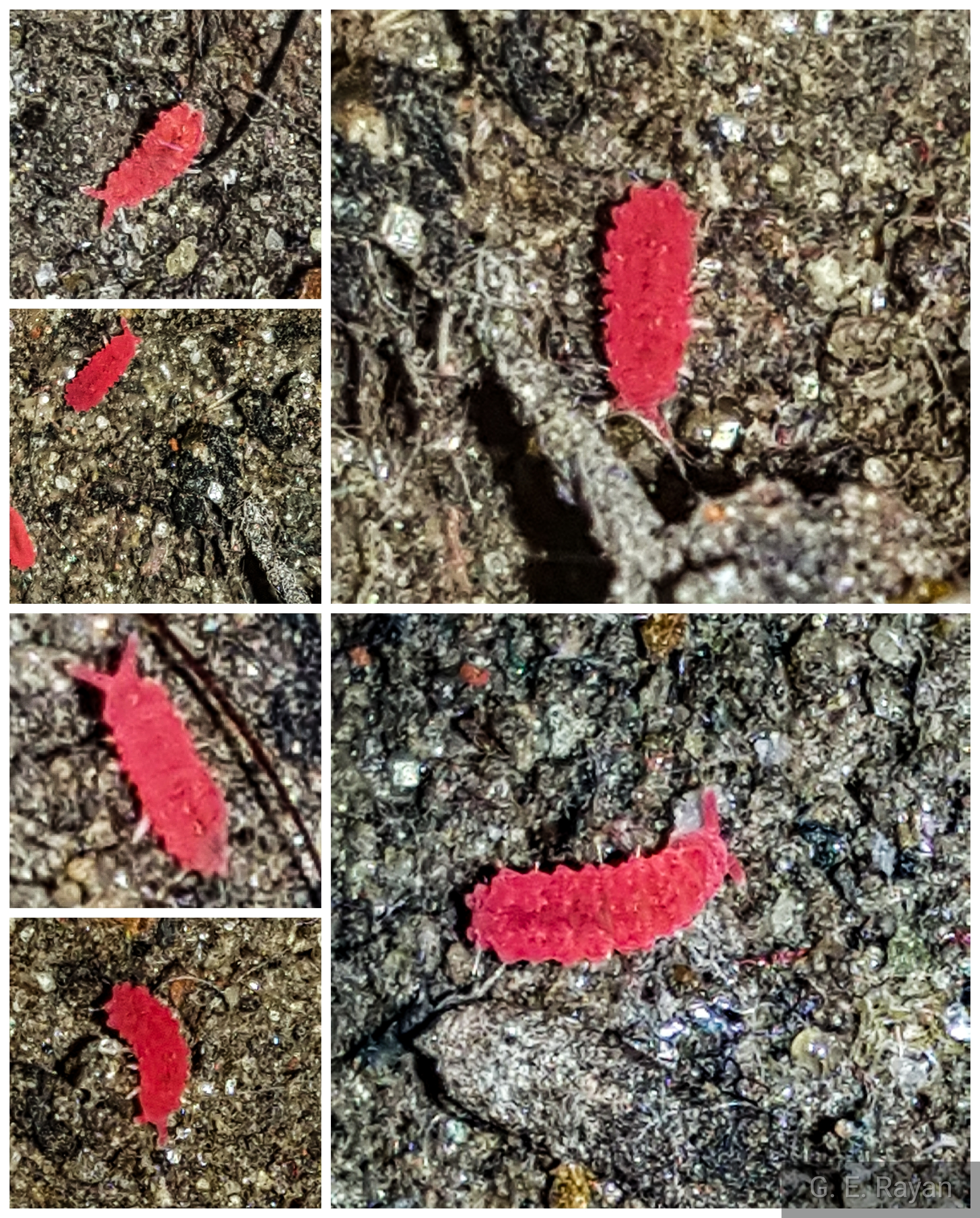
Red Poduromorph Springtails (family Neanuridae) crawling on damp garden soil.

- Family Odontellidae

Superfamily Poduroidea

- Family Poduridae

Superfamily Hypogastruroidea

- Family Hypogastruridae
- Family Pachytullbergiidae
- Family Paleotullbergiidae

Superfamily Gulgastruroidea

- Family Gulgastruridae

Superfamily Onychiuroidea

- Family Onychiuridae
- Family Tullbergiidae

Superfamily Isotogastruroidea

- Family Isotogastruridae
