= Tullbergia templei =

Scientific classification
- Domain: Eukaryota
- Kingdom: Animalia
- Phylum: Arthropoda
- Class: Collembola
- Order: Poduromorpha
- Family: Tullbergiidae
- Genus: Tullbergia
- Species: T. templei

Binomial name
- Tullbergia templei Wise, 1970

Species of springtail

Tullbergia templei is a species of springtail belonging to the family Tullbergiidae. The species was first described by Keith Arthur John Wise in 1970, and is known to occur in Australian Subantarctic Islands such as Heard Island and Macquarie Island.

== Taxonomy ==
The species was first described by Keith Arthur John Wise in 1970, based on specimens collected from Heard Island.

== Description ==
The species is white in colour, with a body length of up to 1.25 mm (0.049 in). The species is morpholiogically similar to T. mediantarctica and Wise and T. mixta, but can be distinguished by its round ocelli (oval in the other species) and differences in setation.

== Distribution and habitat ==
The species is found on various subantarctic islands of Australia, including Heard Island, Macquarie Island and Bishop Islet. T. templei is typically found in coastal habitats of the marine littoral zones of islands on slopes, and is less frequently found in flat areas.
