= Delamarephorura capensis =

Scientific classification
- Kingdom: Animalia
- Phylum: Arthropoda
- Class: Collembola
- Order: Poduromorpha
- Family: Tullbergiidae
- Genus: Delamarephorura
- Species: D. capensis

Binomial name
- Delamarephorura capensis Janion, Deharveng & Weiner, 2013

Species of springtail

Delamarephorura capensis is a species of springtail within the family Tullbergiidae. The holotype of the species is a female, with the type locality being in South Africa, Kleinmond and Betty's Bay, in sandy soil.
