= Neotullbergia =

Scientific classification
- Domain: Eukaryota
- Kingdom: Animalia
- Phylum: Arthropoda
- Class: Collembola
- Order: Poduromorpha
- Family: Tullbergiidae
- Genus: Neotullbergia; Bagnall, 1935

Genus of arthropods

Neotullbergia is a genus of arthropods belonging to the family Tullbergiidae.

The species of this genus are found in Europe.

Species:

- Neotullbergia ramicuspis (Gisin, 1953)
- Neotullbergia staudacheri (Kos, 1940)
- Neotullbergia tricuspis (Borner, 1903)
