= Delamarephorura =

Scientific classification
- Domain: Eukaryota
- Kingdom: Animalia
- Phylum: Arthropoda
- Class: Collembola
- Order: Poduromorpha
- Family: Tullbergiidae
- Genus: Delamarephorura; Weiner & Najt, 1999

Genus of springtails

Delamarephorura is a genus of springtails within the family Tullbergiidae. There are currently 5 species assigned to the genus.

== Species ==
- Delamarephorura bedosae (Thibaud, 2002)
- Delamarephorura capensis Janion, Deharveng & Weiner, 2013
- Delamarephorura salti (C.Delamare Deboutteville, 1953)
- Delamarephorura szeptickii Barra & Weiner, 2009
- Delamarephorura tami Janion, Deharveng & Weiner, 2013
