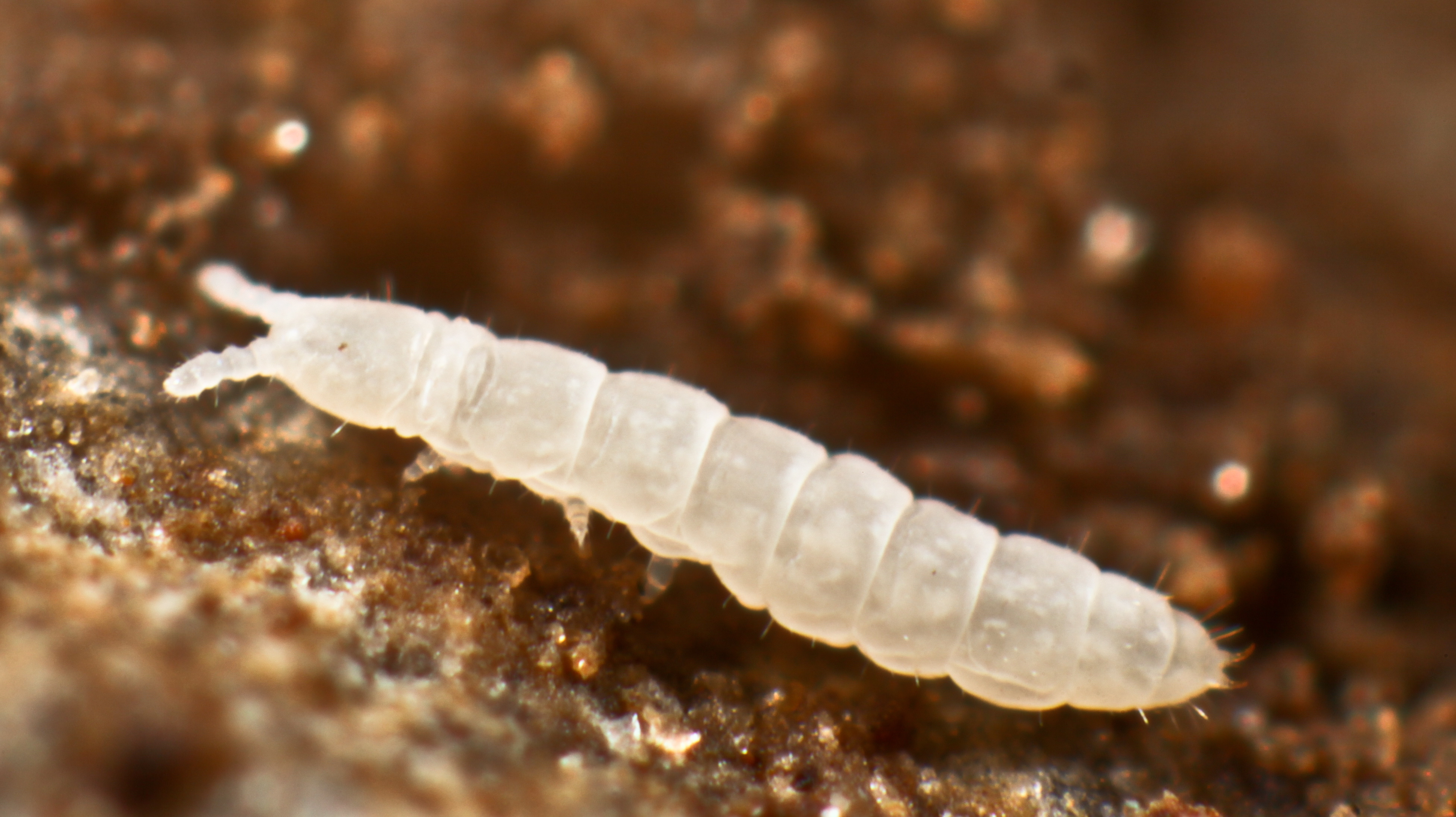

Scientific classification
- Kingdom: Animalia
- Phylum: Arthropoda
- Class: Collembola
- Order: Poduromorpha
- Family: Tullbergiidae
- Genus: Metaphorura; Bagnall, 1936

= Metaphorura =

Genus of arthropods

Metaphorura is a genus of arthropods belonging to the family Tullbergiidae.

The species of this genus are found in Europe.

Species:

- Metaphorura bipartita (Handschin, 1920)
- Metaphorura denisi Simon, 1985
