= Tullbergia mediantarctica =

Scientific classification
- Domain: Eukaryota
- Kingdom: Animalia
- Phylum: Arthropoda
- Class: Collembola
- Order: Poduromorpha
- Family: Tullbergiidae
- Genus: Tullbergia
- Species: T. mediantarctica

Binomial name
- Tullbergia mediantarctica Wise, 1967

Species of springtail

Tullbergia mediantarctica is a species of springtail belonging to the family Tullbergiidae. The species was first described by Keith Arthur John Wise in 1967, and is only known to occur around the Shackleton Glacier area of Antarctica.

== Taxonomy ==
The species was first described by Keith Arthur John Wise in 1967, who noted morphological differences between the two Tullbergia species of the Antarctic mainland and those of more northern localities. The species has limited genetic variation.

== Description ==
The species is white in colour. It can be differentiated from Tullbergia mixta due to the presence of an unguiculus.

== Distribution and habitat ==
The species is found in Antarctica, with specimens primarily found around the Shackleton Glacier area.
