= Tullbergia =

Scientific classification
- Domain: Eukaryota
- Kingdom: Animalia
- Phylum: Arthropoda
- Class: Collembola
- Order: Poduromorpha
- Family: Tullbergiidae
- Genus: Tullbergia; Lubbock, 1876

Genus of springtails

Tullbergia is a genus of springtails within the family Tullbergiidae.

== Species ==
- Tullbergia africana Martynova, 1979
- Tullbergia alcirae J.G.Palacios-Vargas & A.E.Salazar-Martínez, 2014
- Tullbergia anops K.Christiansen & P.Bellinger, 1980
- Tullbergia antarctica Lubbock, 1876
- Tullbergia arctica Wahlgren, 1900
- Tullbergia australica Womersley, 1933
- Tullbergia bella A.Fjellberg, 1988
- Tullbergia bisetosa Börner, 1903
- Tullbergia clavata Wills, 1934
- Tullbergia collis G.A.Bacon, 1914
- Tullbergia crozetensis Deharveng, 1981
- Tullbergia duops K.Christiansen & P.Bellinger, 1980
- Tullbergia gambiensis H.Womersley, 1935
- Tullbergia ghilarovi (Khanislamova, 1987)
- Tullbergia harti (Rusek, 1991)
- Tullbergia huetheri da Gama, 1968
- Tullbergia inconspicua D.C.de Izarra, 1965
- Tullbergia insularis E.Wahlgren, 1906
- Tullbergia kilimanjarica (C.Delamare Deboutteville, 1953)
- Tullbergia latens K.Christiansen & P.Bellinger, 1980
- Tullbergia mala K.Christiansen & P.Bellinger, 1980
- Tullbergia massoudi Hermosilla & Rubio, 1976
- Tullbergia maxima Deharveng, 1981
- Tullbergia mediantarctica Wise, 1967
- Tullbergia meridionalis Cassagnau & Rapoport, 1962
- Tullbergia mexicana Handschin, 1928
- Tullbergia minensis R.Arlé, 1960
- Tullbergia mixta E.Wahlgren, 1906
- Tullbergia nearctica E.C.Bernard, 2016
- Tullbergia nulla K.Christiansen & P.Bellinger, 1980
- Tullbergia obtusochaeta (Rusek, 1976)
- Tullbergia ouatilou J.Najt & W.M.Weiner, 1997
- Tullbergia paranensis Izarra, 1969
- Tullbergia pomorskii (Smolis, 2010)
- Tullbergia quadrisetosa (Willem, 1902)
- Tullbergia rapoporti J.I.Arbea, 2016
- Tullbergia schaefferi Salmon, 1974
- Tullbergia templei Wise, 1970
- Tullbergia tolanara Thibaud & J-M, 2008
- Tullbergia trisetosa Schäffer, 1897
- Tullbergia vancouverica (Rusek, 1976)
- Tullbergia ventanensis Rapoport, 1963
- Tullbergia womersleyi (Bagnall, 1947)
