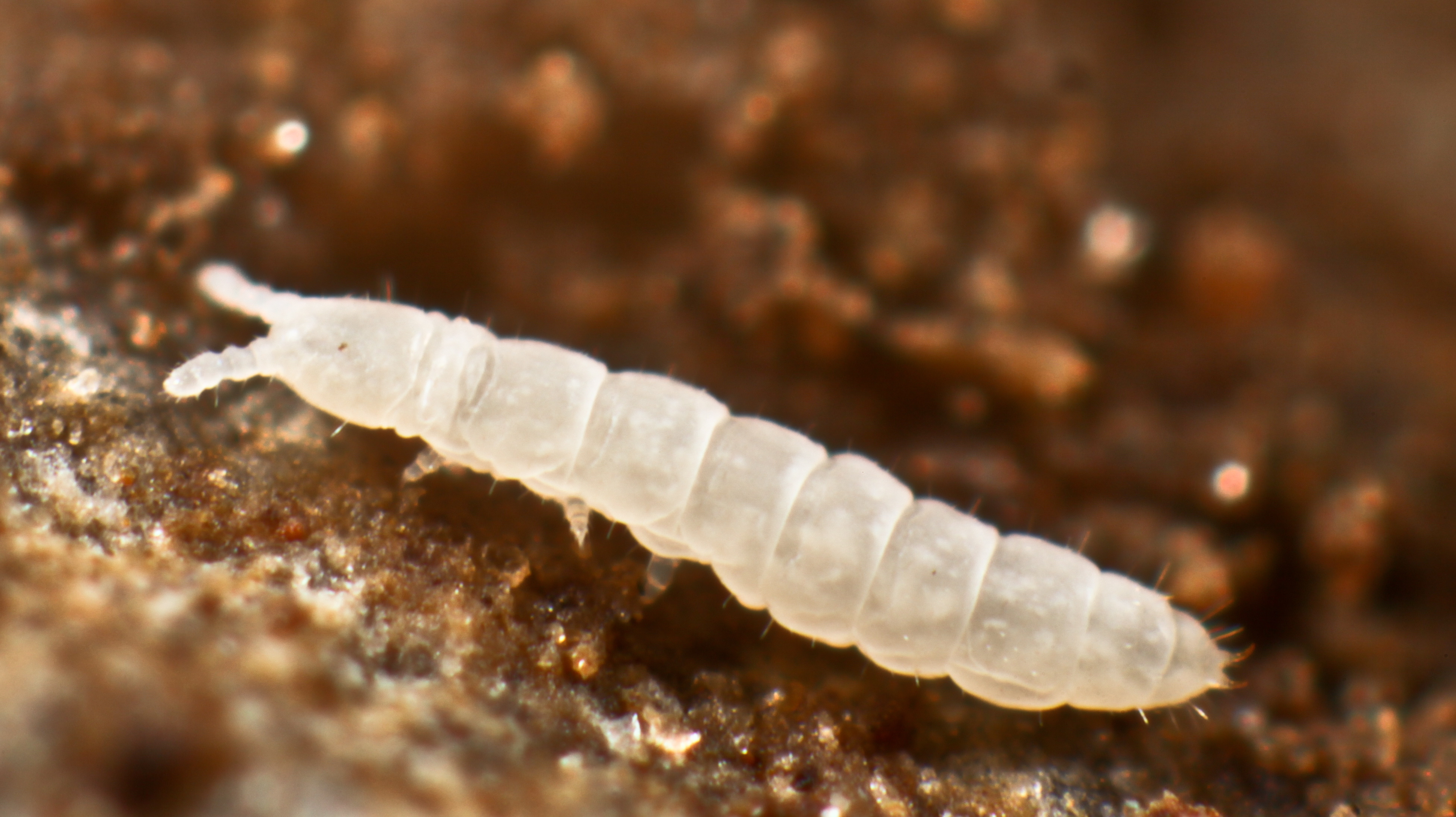
- Metaphorura affinis

Scientific classification
- Kingdom: Animalia
- Phylum: Arthropoda
- Clade: Pancrustacea
- Class: Collembola
- Order: Poduromorpha
- Superfamily: Onychiuroidea
- Family: Tullbergiidae; Bagnall, 1935

= Tullbergiidae =

Family of springtails

Tullbergiidae is a family of springtails in the order Poduromorpha. There are more than 30 genera and 120 described species in Tullbergiidae.

== Genera ==
These 34 genera belong to the family Tullbergiidae:

- Ameritulla
- Anaphorura de Izarra, 1972
- Boudinotia Weiner & Najt, 1991
- Clavaphorura Salmon, 1943
- Delamarephorura Weiner & Najt, 1999
- Dinaphorura Bagnall, 1935
- Doutnacia Rusek, 1974
- Fissuraphorura Rusek, 1991
- Jevania Rusek, 1978
- Karlstejnia Rusek, 1974
- Marcuzziella Rusek, 1975
- Mesaphorura Börner, 1901
- Metaphorura Stach, 1954
- Mexicaphorura
- Mixturatulla
- Multivesicula Rusek, 1982
- Najtiaphorura Weiner & Thibaud, 1991
- Neonaphorura Bagnall, 1935
- Neotullbergia Bagnall, 1935
- Paratullbergia Womersley, 1930
- Pongeiella Rusek, 1991
- Prabhergia Salmon, 1965
- Psammophorura Thibaud & Weiner, 1994
- Rotundiphorura Rusek, 1991
- Scaphaphorura Petersen, 1965
- Sensilatullbergia Thibaud & Ndiaye, 2006
- Stenaphorura Absolon, 1900
- Stenaphorurella Lucianez & Simon, 1992
- Tasphorura Greenslade & Rusek, 1996
- Tillieria Weiner & Najt, 1991
- Tullbergia Lubbock, 1876
- Tullbergiella
- Wankeliella Rusek, 1975
- Weinera Thibaud, 1993
