= Dehibolo =

Mountain village in Uzbekistan

- Village
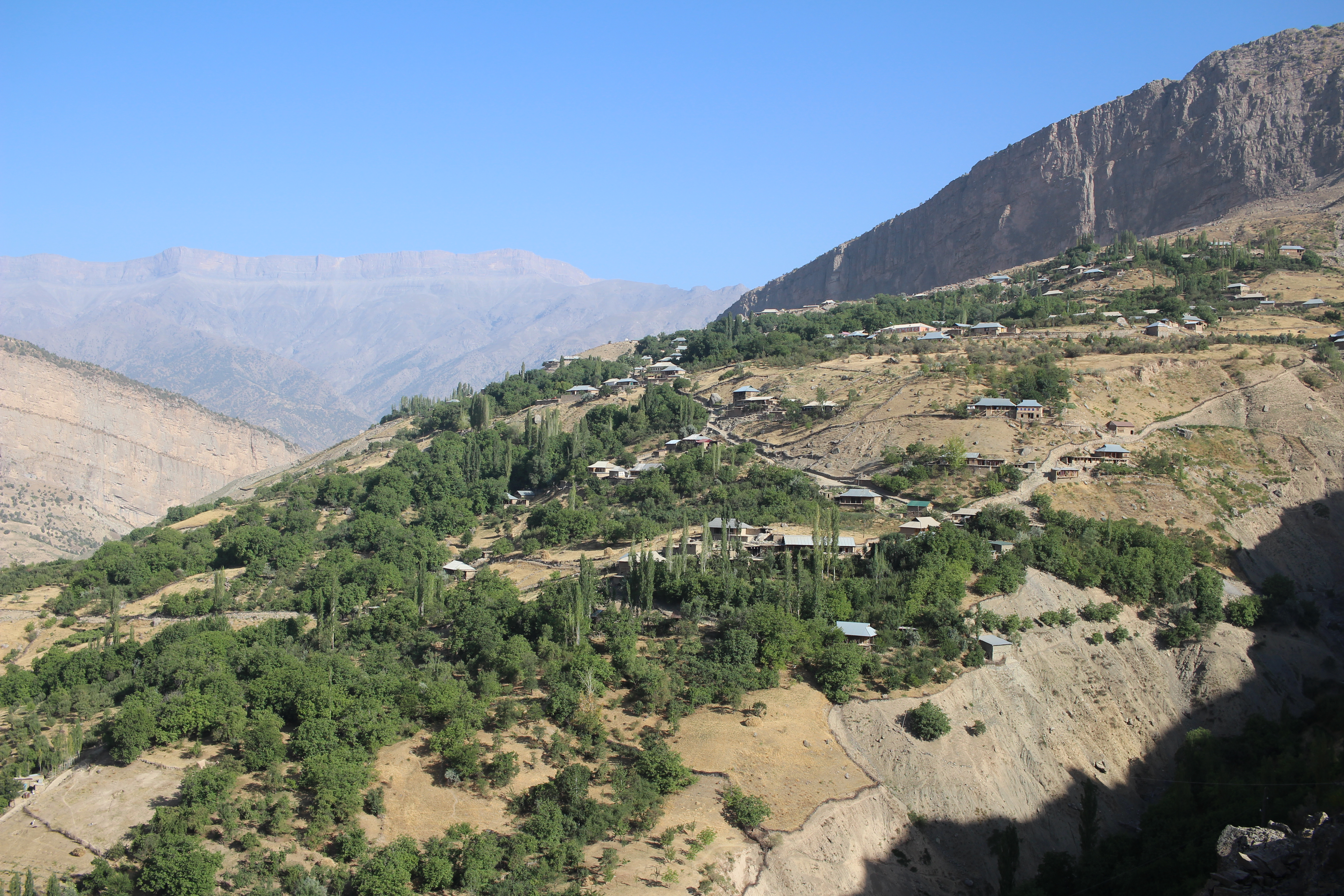
- Morning View from the East

- Location within Uzbekistan
- Coordinates: 38°21′10.5″N 67°27′32.6″E
- Country: Uzbekistan
- Region: Surxondaryo Region
- District: Boysun District
- Elevation: 1,750 m (5,740 ft)

Population (2024)
  - Total: 987
- Time zone: UTC +5

Dehibolo (also spelled Dii-Bala, in the local parlance Diybolo, Uzbek: Dehibolo (or Dexibolo), Russian: Дюйбало (Note: For greater accuracy most Cyrillic names in this article are romanized according to Scientific transliteration of Cyrillic (examples: č – ch, š – sh, ž – zh, y – j).)) is a mountain village in the Boysun district of the Surxondaryo region in the southeast of Uzbekistan. It is most known as the highest village in the country and as the starting point for the exploration of the cave Boybuloq, the deepest cave in Central Asia and one of the very deep caves in the world.

== Name ==
The name comes from the language of the inhabitants of the village, the Tajik language, a variety of Persian. It is composed of two words: "dehi" – village, and "bolo" – upper, giving upper village, often translated as the highest village.

== Location ==
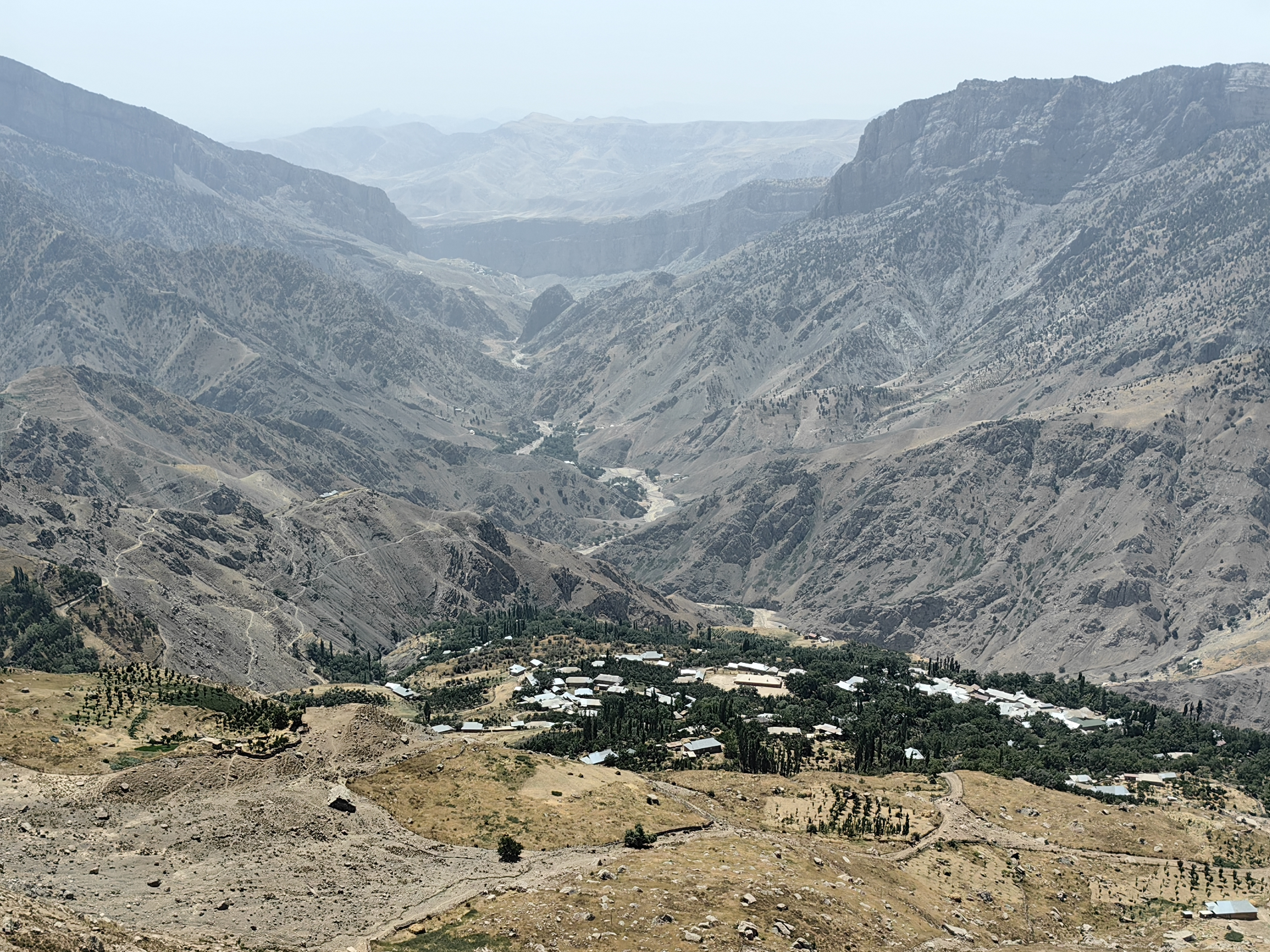
View from the north with Mt. Kushona and Mt. Buzraha

Dehibolo is situated in the southeast corner of Uzbekistan, 50 km from the border with Tajikistan and 120 km from the border with Afghanistan, at an elevation of 1,750 meters. It lies above the Zervaroz river, under the southeast wall of the Chul-Bair mountain (top peak 3,822 meters a. s. l.), which is one of the three most southwest outcrops of the Hissar range, of Tian Shan mountain chain. Dehibolo area, including the side valleys with orchards and small fields tended from late spring till the autumn, is delimited by Chul-Bair from the west to northeast by Kushona mountain (2,840 m) on the east and by Buzraha mountain (2,340 m) from the south to southwest.

The nearest villages are Kurgancha (Qurghoncha), 4 km to the west in the valley, situated on both sides of Zervaroz river, and Alachapan, 5 km to the northwest, at the foot of the Chul-Bair southwest slope. The distance from Boysun, the district center, to Dehibolo is 29 km as the crow flies, and 50 km or three to four hours drive in a high-clearance vehicle.

== History ==
According to oral tradition, Dehibolo was settled about 800 years ago by people from Boysun and Dushanbe. Until modern times the high mountain villages such as Dehibolo used to be self-sufficient, especially as the snow covered the trails to outside world for half a year. Livestock provided meat and dairy products, the village had a mill for wheat and oil mill for linseed oil. Villagers wove carpets from sheep and goat wool, pressed felt for winter garments, they sewed cow hides. There was a blacksmith in the village, a folk healer and midwives to help at childbirth.

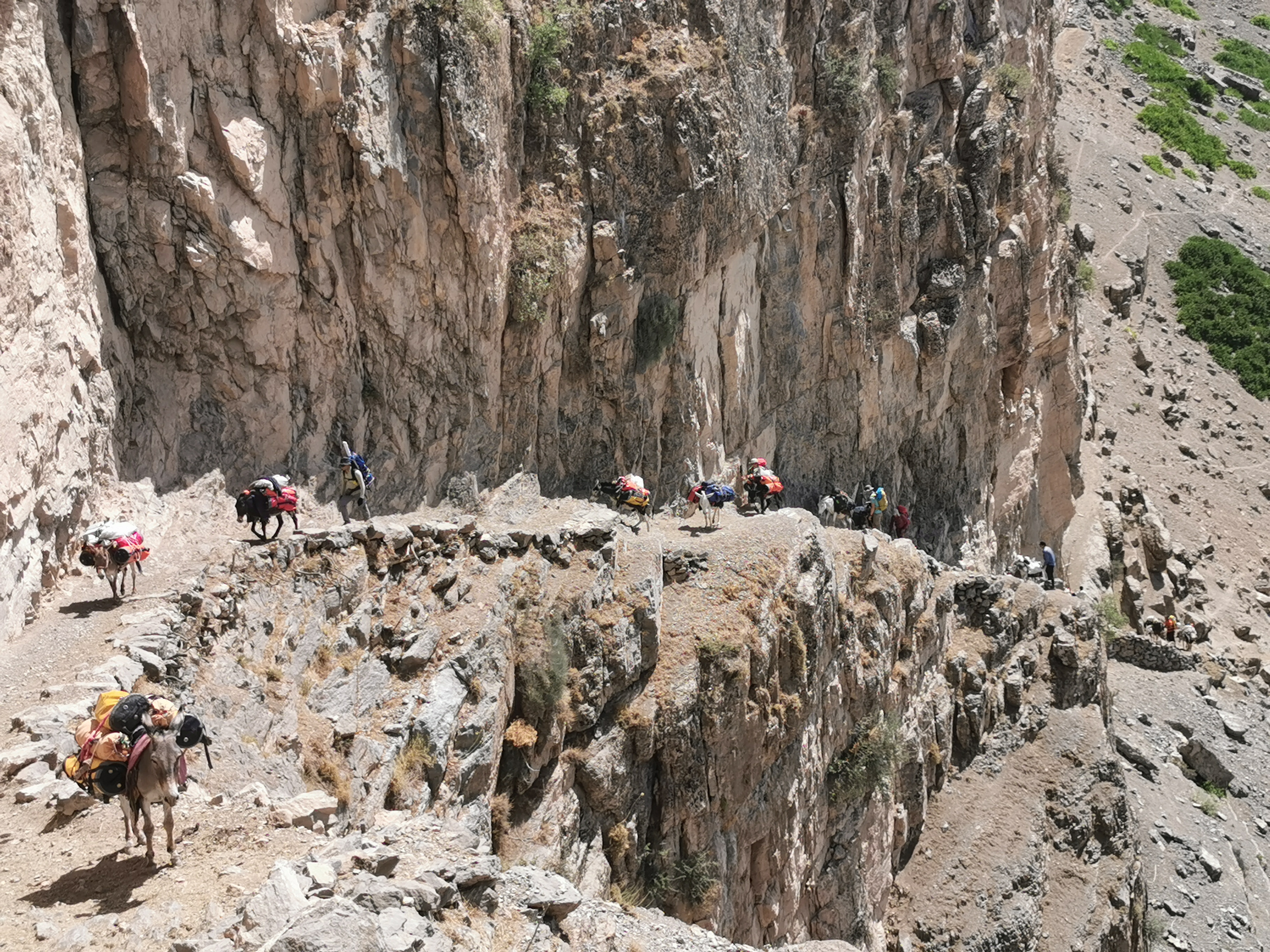
Mountain trail west of the village

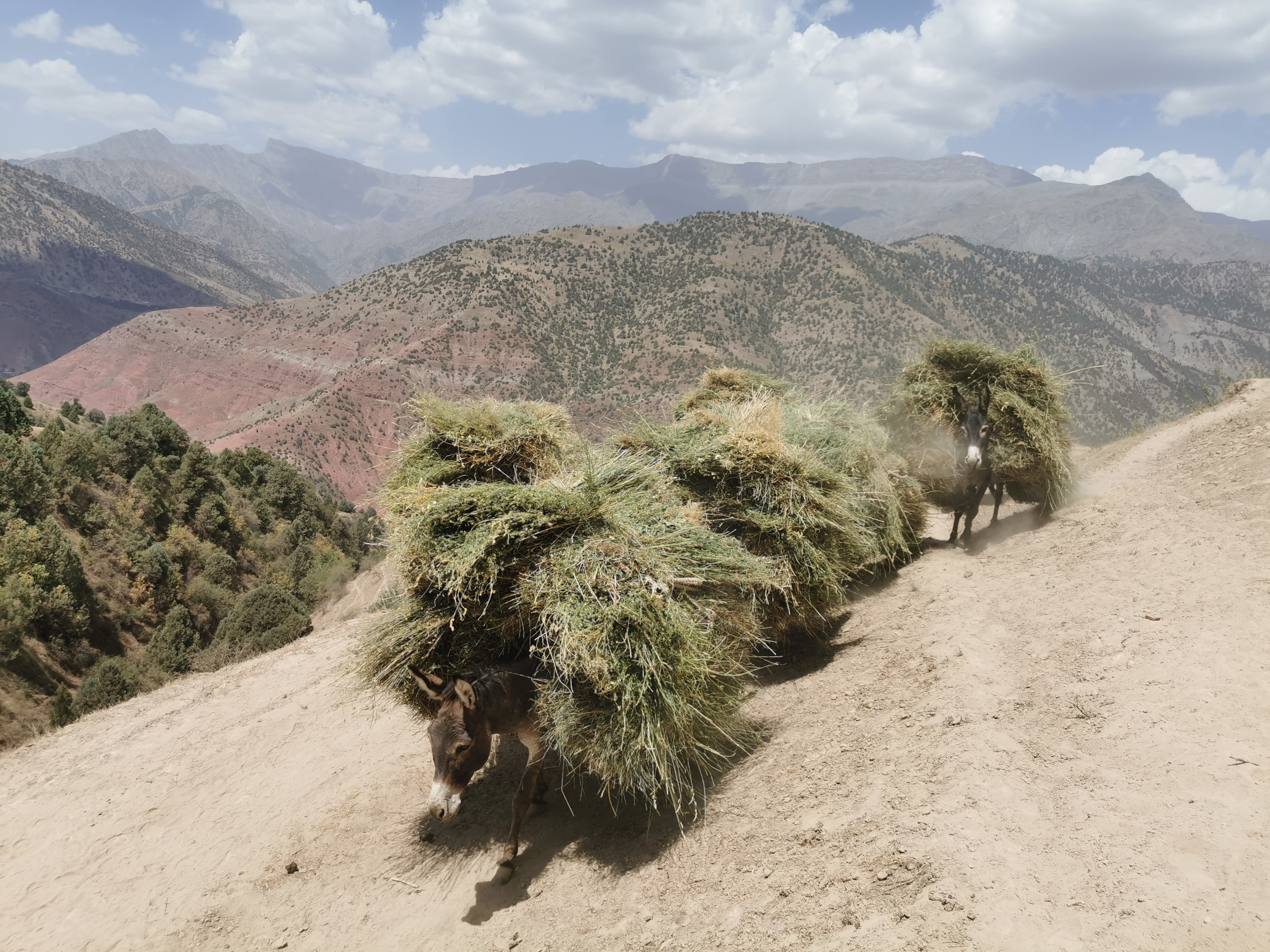
Donkeys carrying hay on the Chul-Bair slope, back to Dehibolo

Over hundred years ago grazing has become an ever greater problem with the growth of population and livestock. Dehibolo is located under a 150-200 meters high mountain wall, while on the other side of the ridge the slope is gentle with places suitable for grain fields and pastures, inaccessible because of the wall. A rich widow, Bibi Shah, who owned a large herd of sheep and goats, cattle and horses, and employed many shepherds and servants, proposed to finance a wide trail which would cross the wall. The stonemasons, led by master Olim, built a 500-meter long trail west of the village, in places cut into the cliff and, where necessary, reinforced with wooden rebars. In her honor the path was named "Bibi Shah trail" (Bibishoh shotisi). In 1975 the trail was renovated. It was mentioned in the film "Forgotten Songs" about Boysun, directed by Temurmalik Yunusov.

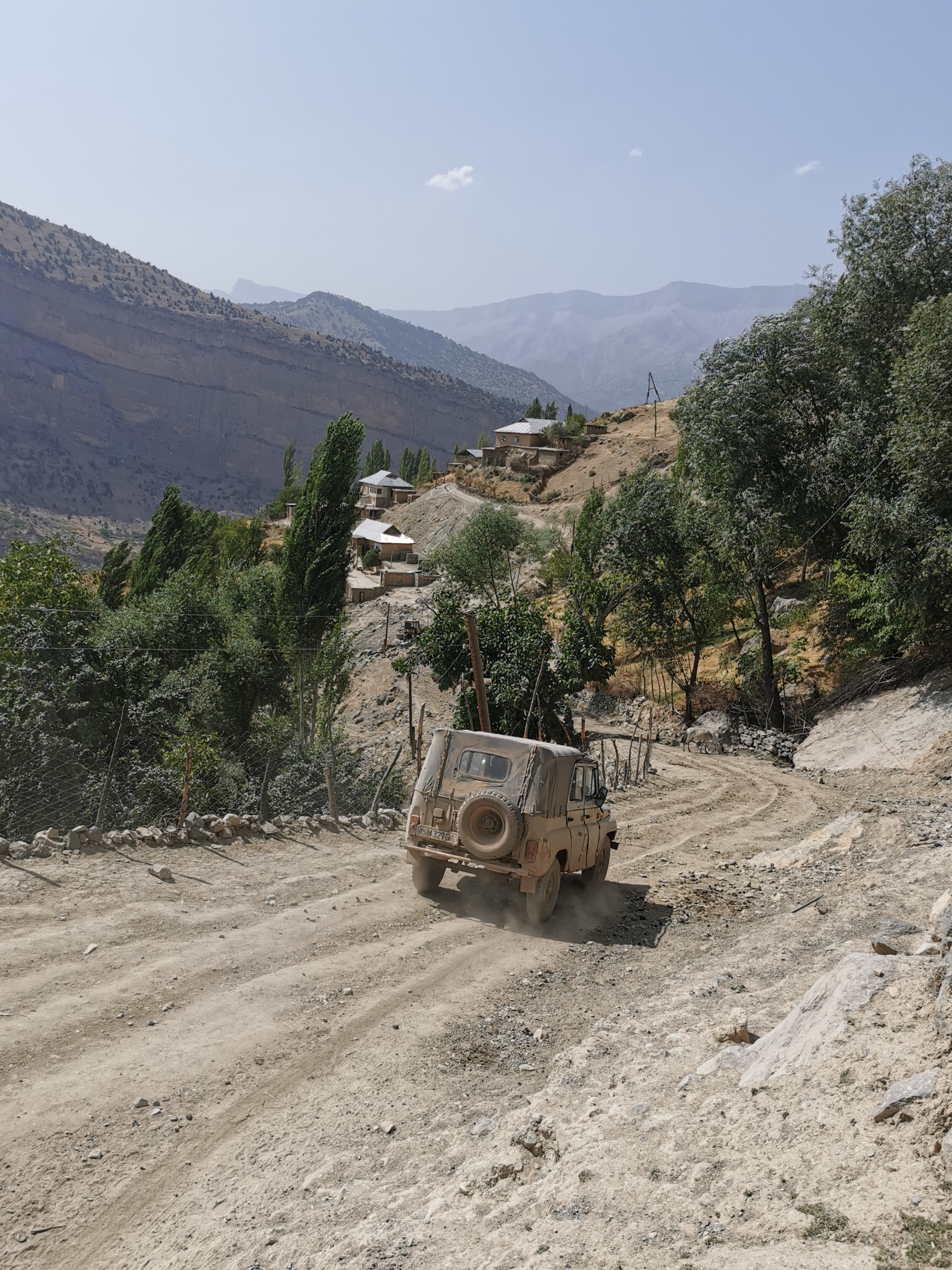
Road to Kurgancha

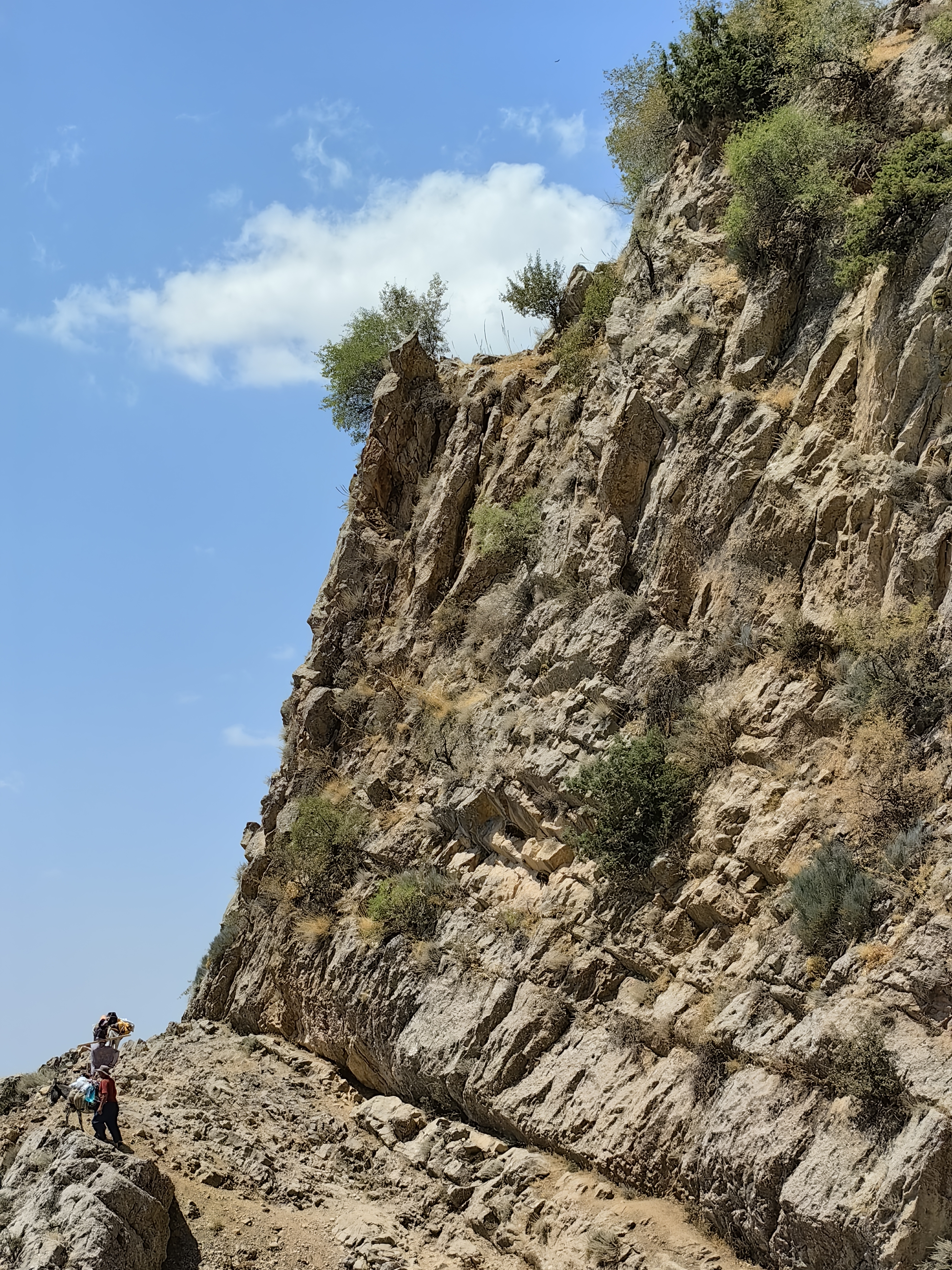
Top of the ridge

According to Aleksej V. Arapov, a Tashkent author in the field of history and culture of Central Asia, until the middle of the twentieth century a large wooden idol, with crossed legs and hands in front, sat in a niche high up the Chul-Bair wall above the village. On order of the Mullah the idol was removed and hacked to pieces.

The water started flowing to the village in 1971 when a tube, the end of which is at the western entrance to the village and serves as the village fountain, was installed from the source Hodja Nur above Dehibolo, under the Chul-Bair mountain wall.

The motorable road from Kurgancha, considerably shorter than the previous trail, was built in 1982. In 1983, the village was connected to the country's electricity grid. It was not intended to power house appliances, and was, as of 2024, mainly used for illumination.

== Economy and Amenities ==
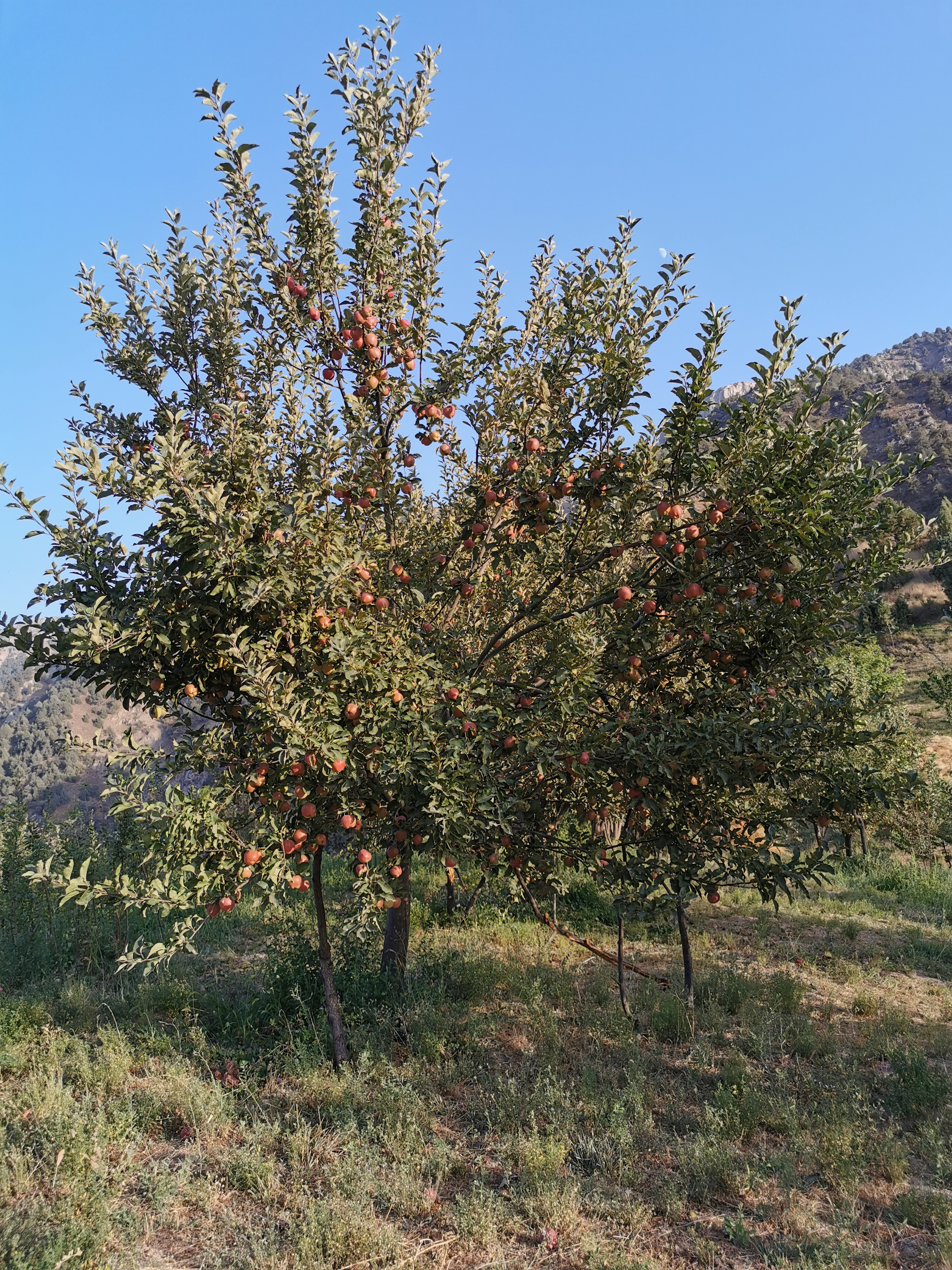
Apple orchard

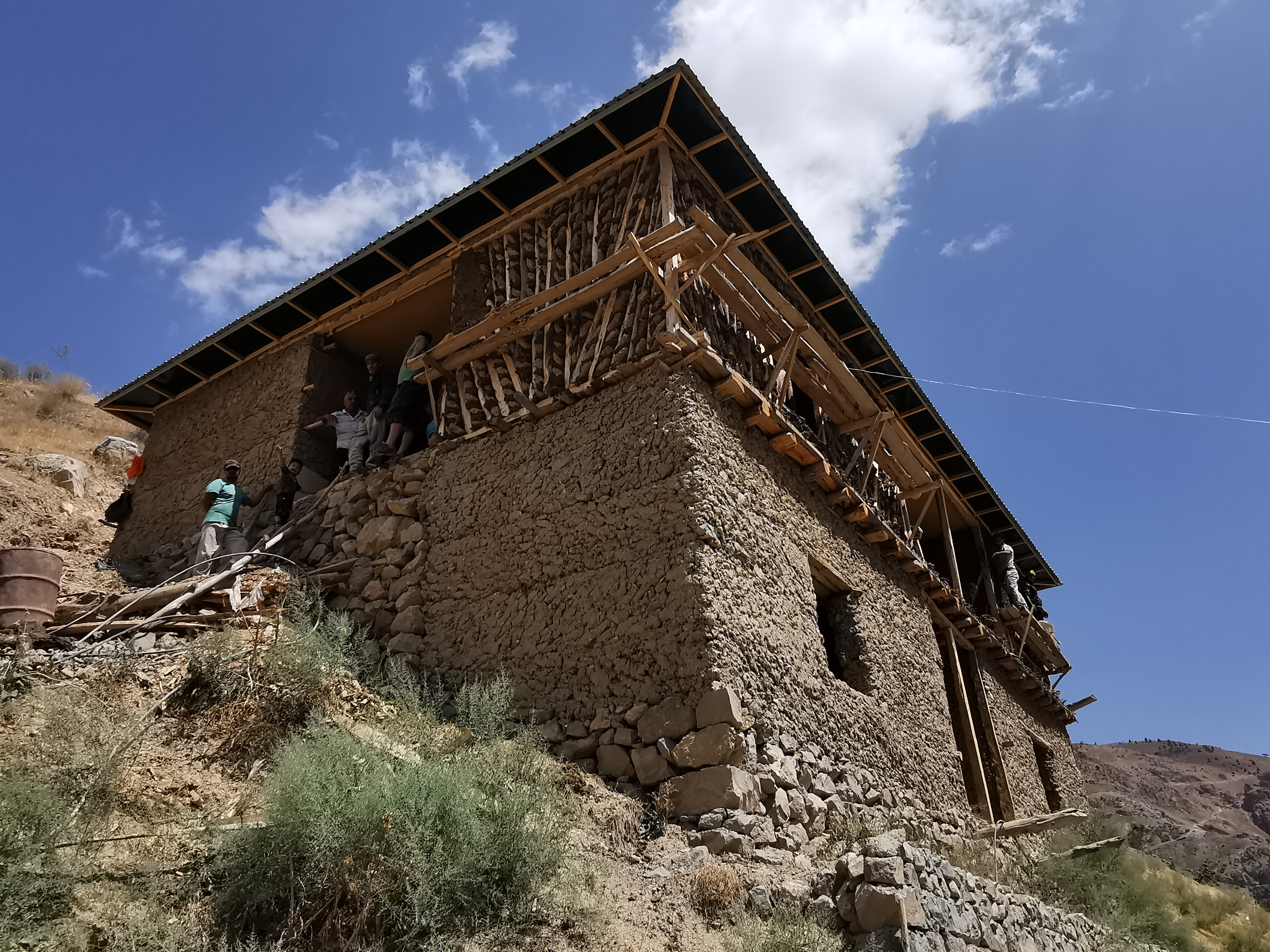
House under construction

The population lives off animal husbandry, agriculture, fruit growing, horticulture and clover cultivation. The prevalent livestock is goats, sheep, with some cattle, poultry and beekeeping is also common. Donkeys serve for transportation of both goods and people to the pastures, small fields, orchards and homes in the outlying valleys. Apples are the main fruit crop, supplemented by peaches, plums and walnuts.

As in other the most distant mountain villages of Boysun District, such as Alachapan, Kurgancha or Dugoba, Dehibolo has retained original architecture, where houses are built, with the exception of corrugated sheet metal roofs, of locally available timber, stone and clay. Due to scarcity of water, all of it brought on foot, homes in the village were equipped with dry toilets. Cooking was mostly done on gas stoves, with 50-liter liquefied gas cylinders supplied to the village from the service center for storage and distribution of domestic gas in Dugoba.

As of 2024 mobile phone coverage was provided through cell phone towers on the Buzraha mountain on the opposite side of the Zervaroz river valley. It also reached higher locations in the valleys east of Dehibolo, where the summer homes are not connected to the electricity grid, but car batteries, from time to time brought from the village by pack donkeys, serve to recharge the phones and provide modest illumination in the evening.

In the valley under the village, just above the river Zervaroz and the road to Kurgancha (Qurghoncha in Uzbek), 1,455 meters a. s. l., there is a large source of potable water, Holtan Chashma.

== Social life and education ==
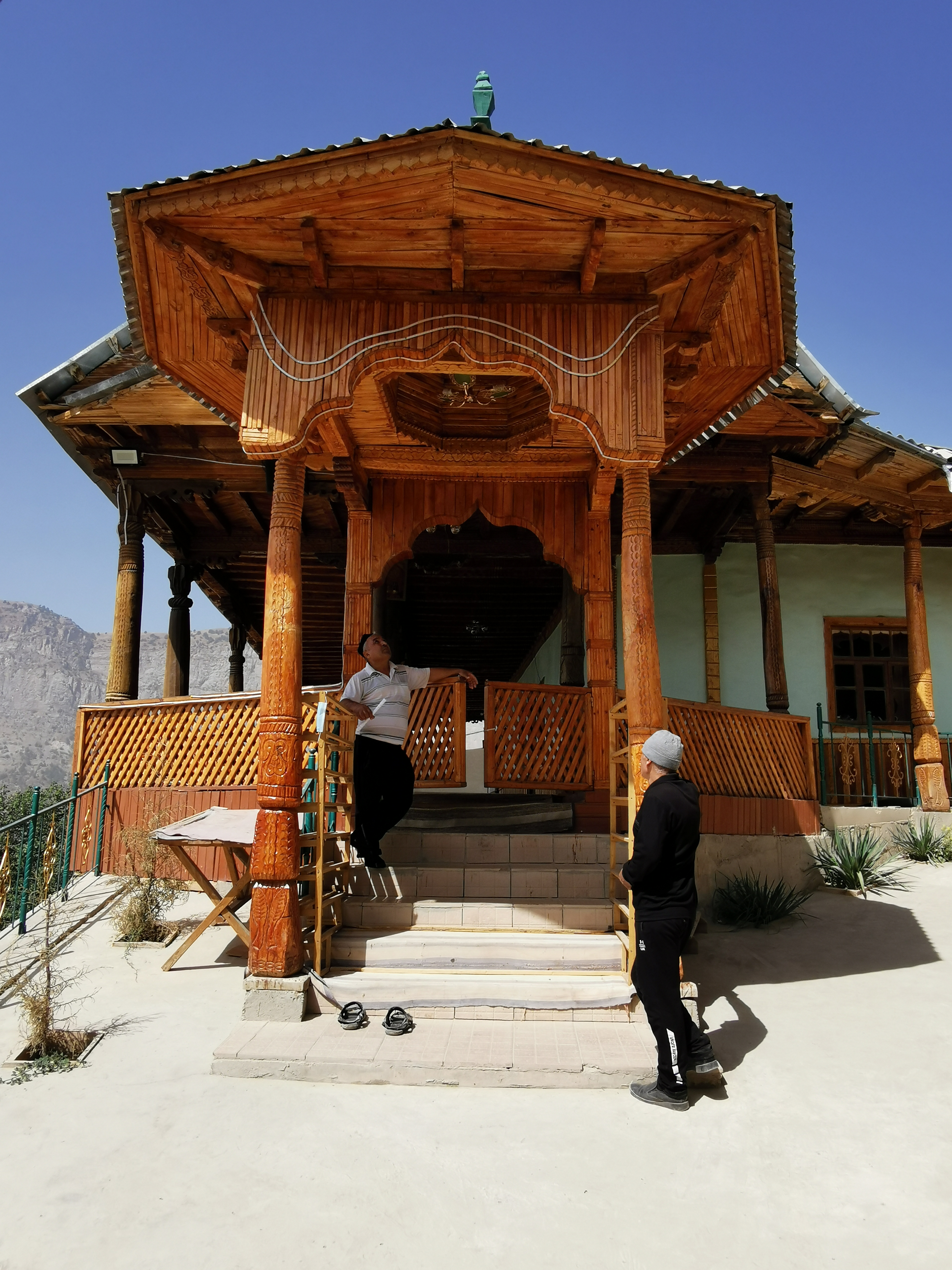
Mosque entrance

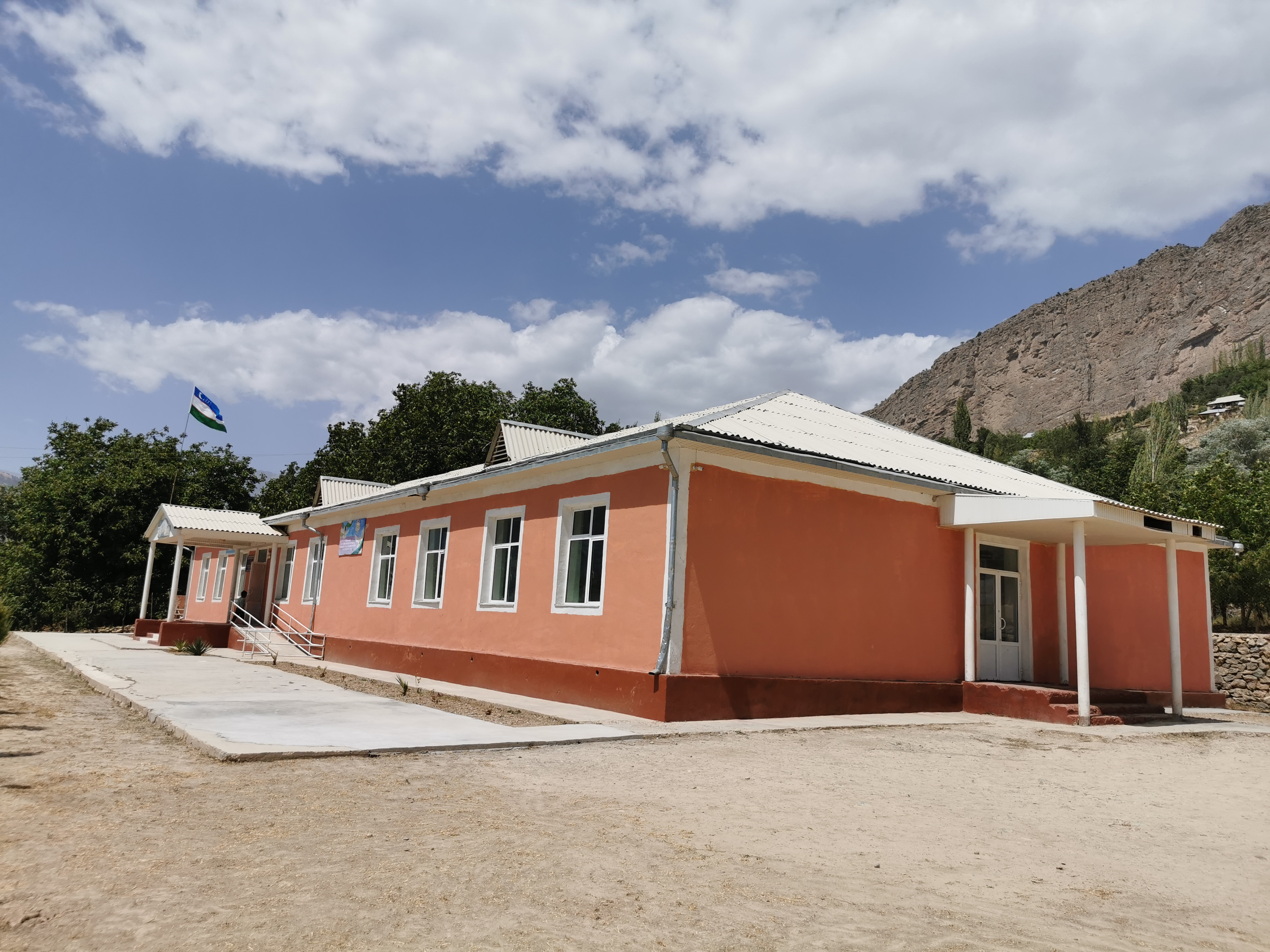
The school

As of 2024 Dehibolo had 987 inhabitants, living in 168 households.

There is a 150-year-old mosque in Dehibolo. It was named "Abu Hanifa" and was registered on March 31, 2021, by the Department of Justice of Surxondaryo region. The mosque was rebuilt by village craftsmen and master Tashmuhammad, before 2021. The pillars and the ceiling of the mosque are made of wood decorated with floral and ornamental carvings. Dehibolo cemetery is located on the eastern side of the village.

Dehibolo also has an 11-grade school, School No. 19 of the Boysun district. It was renovated in August 2021. In the 2020/2021 school year, 224 students were educated at the school, teaching was divided into 2 shifts, the morning one and the afternoon one.

== Dehibolo Gallery ==
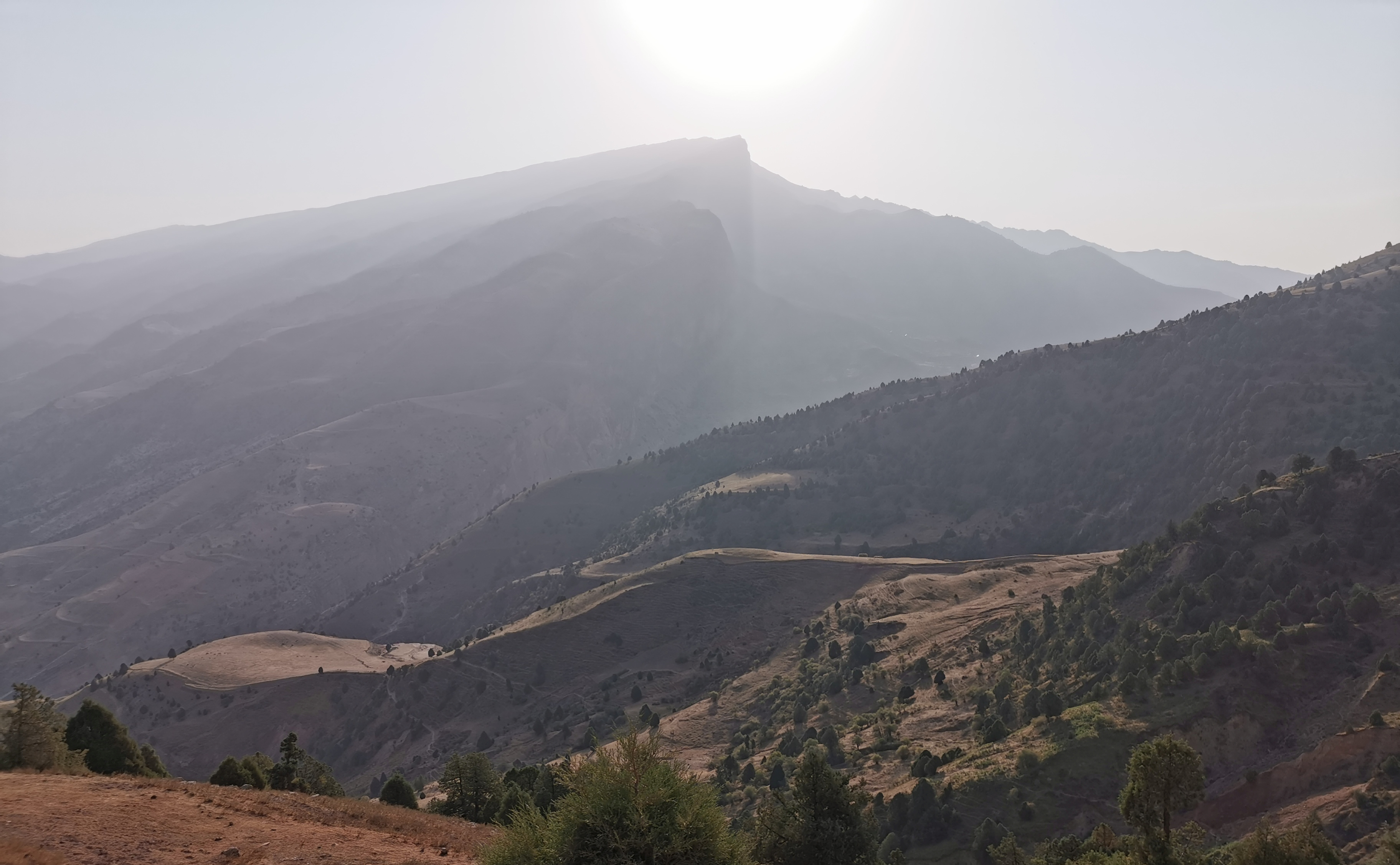
Sunrise over Chul-Bair

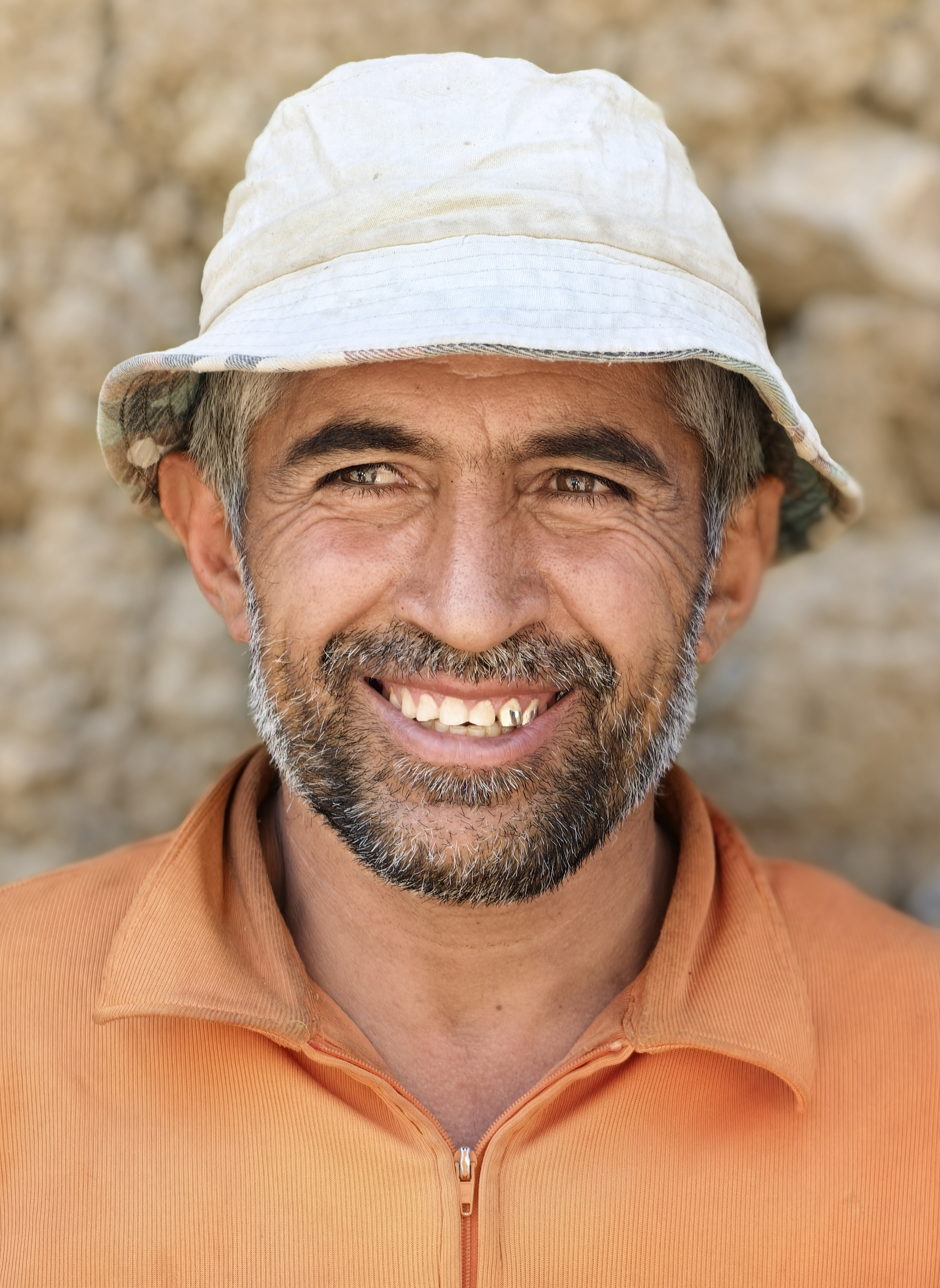
Man from Dehibolo

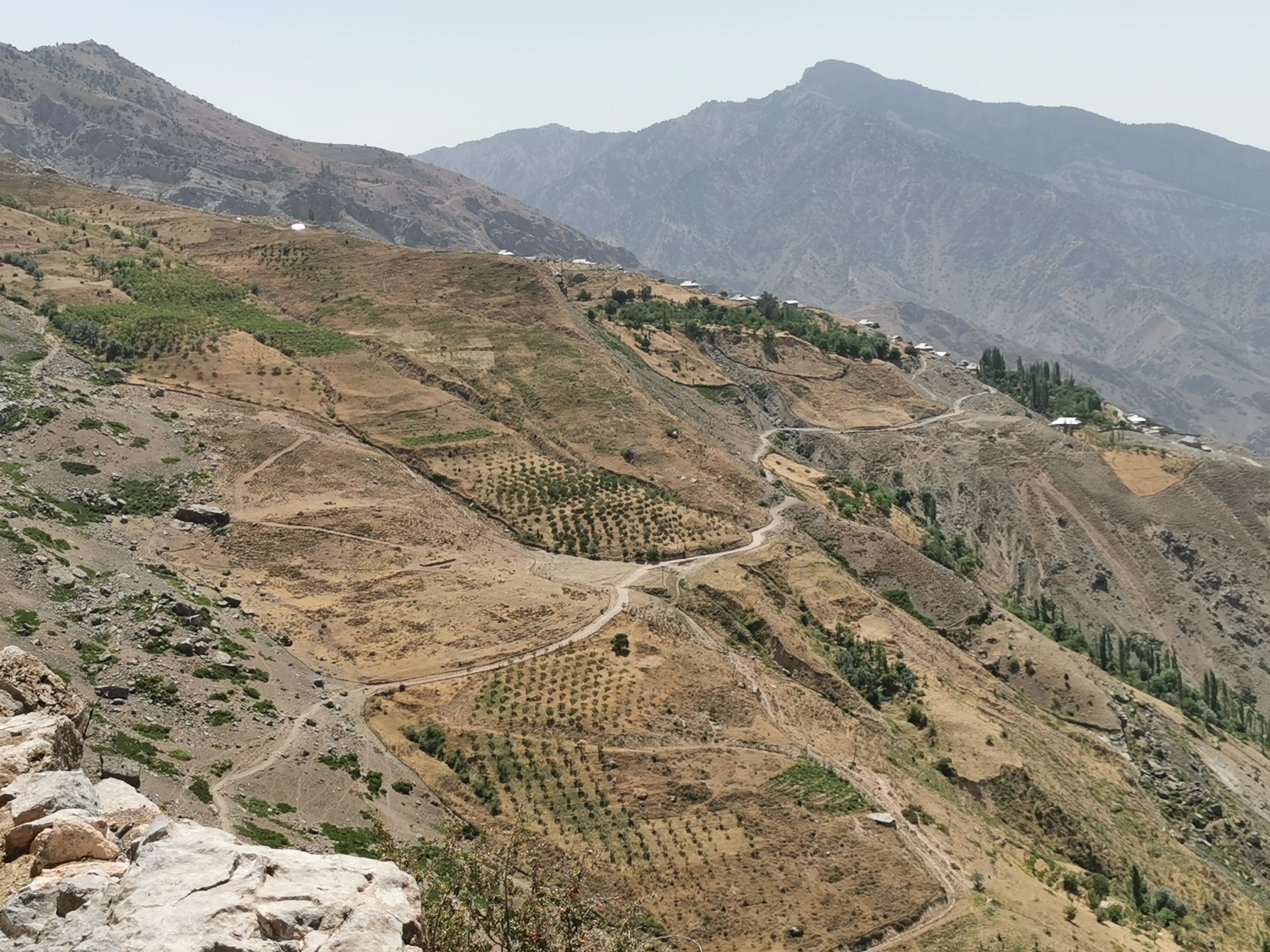
Village from the west

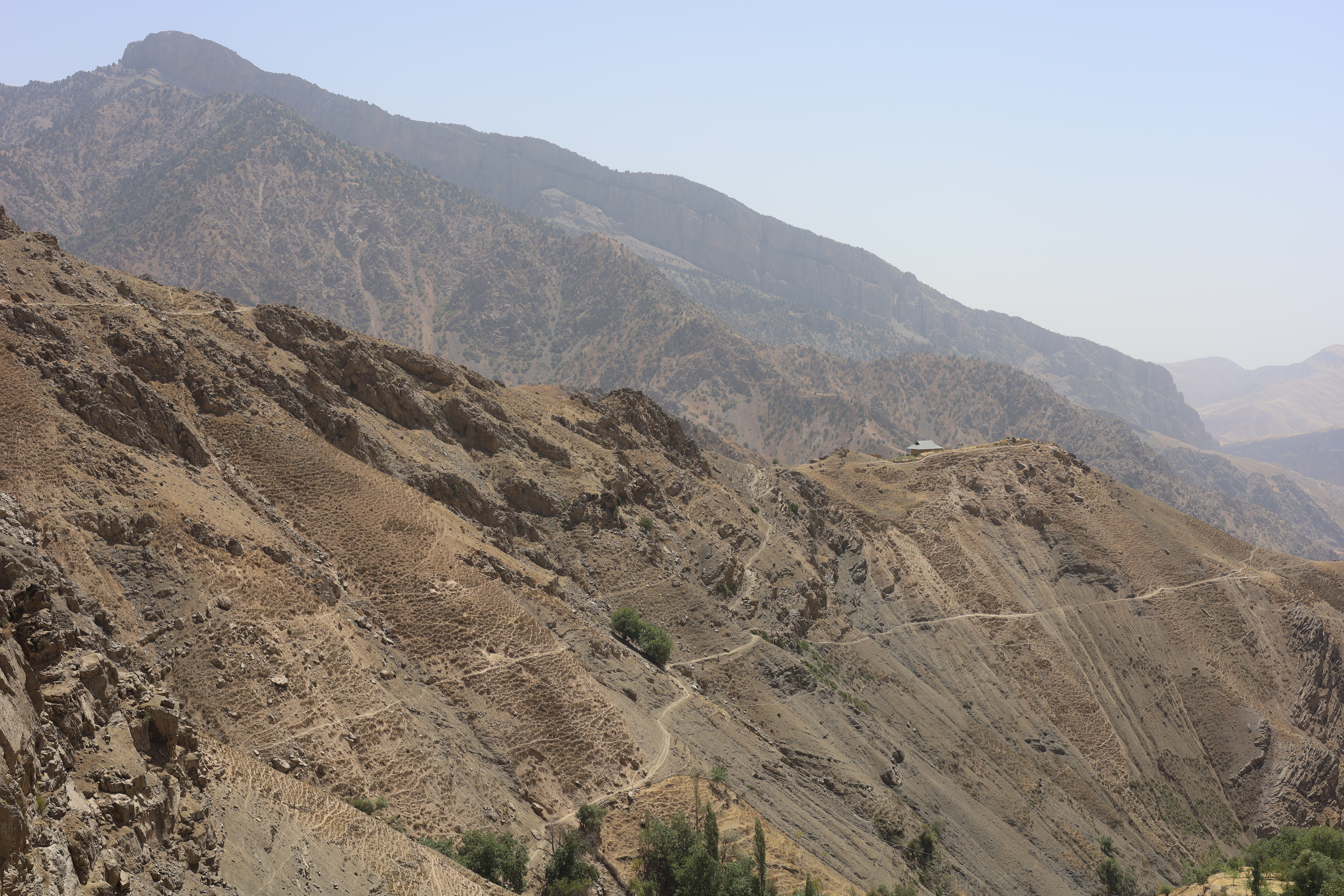
View to the east

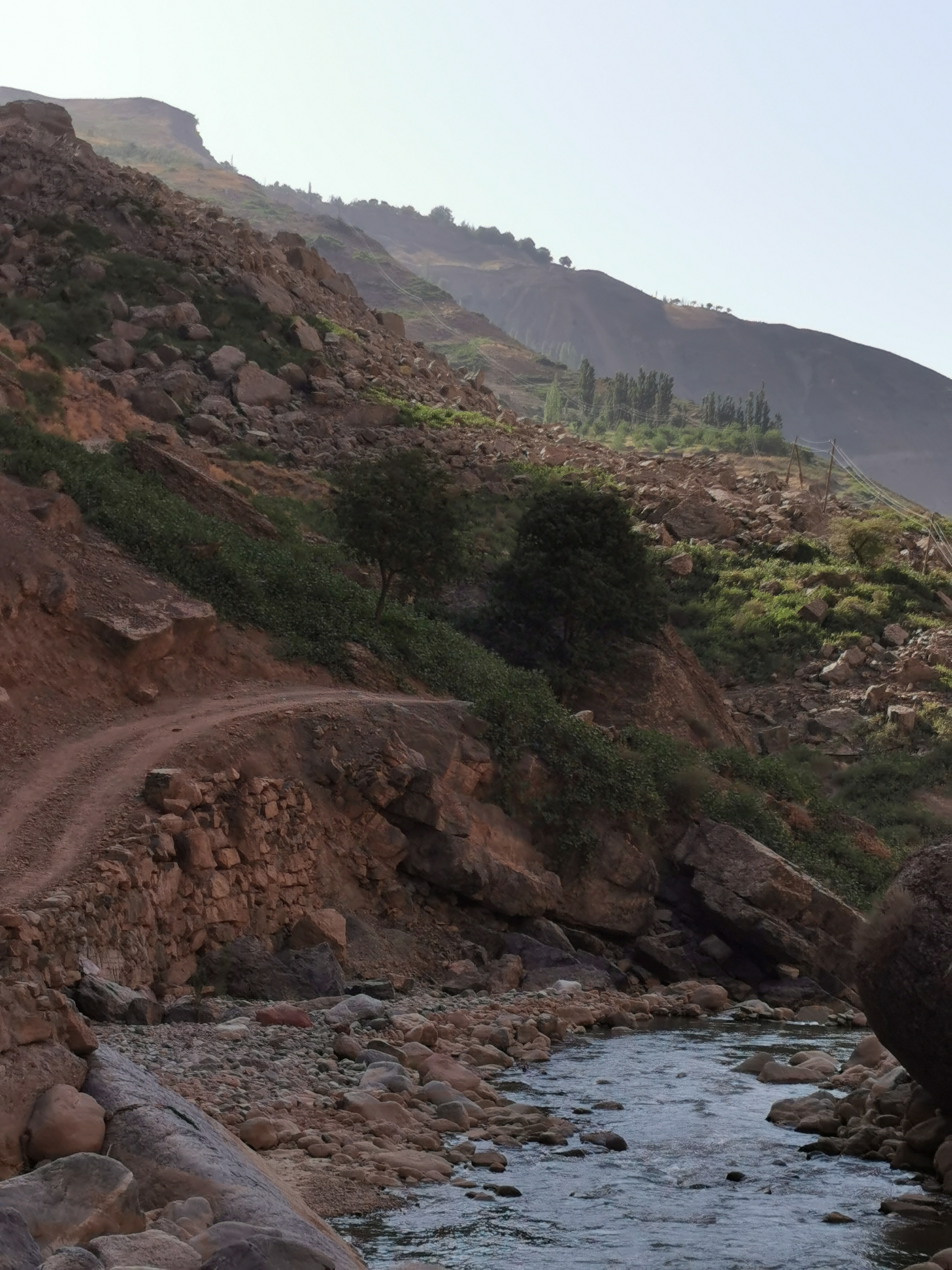
Zervaroz river

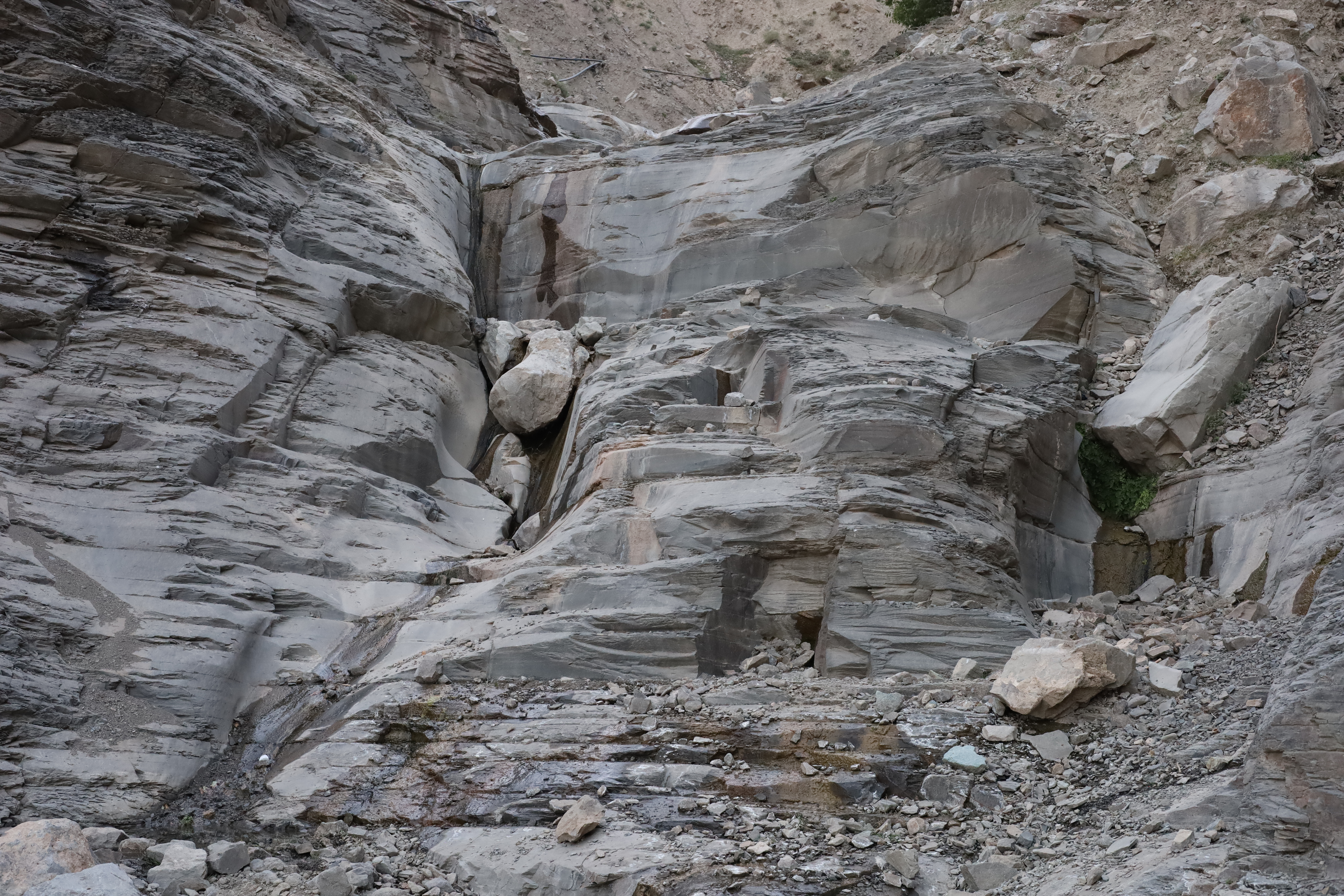
Rock strata east of the village

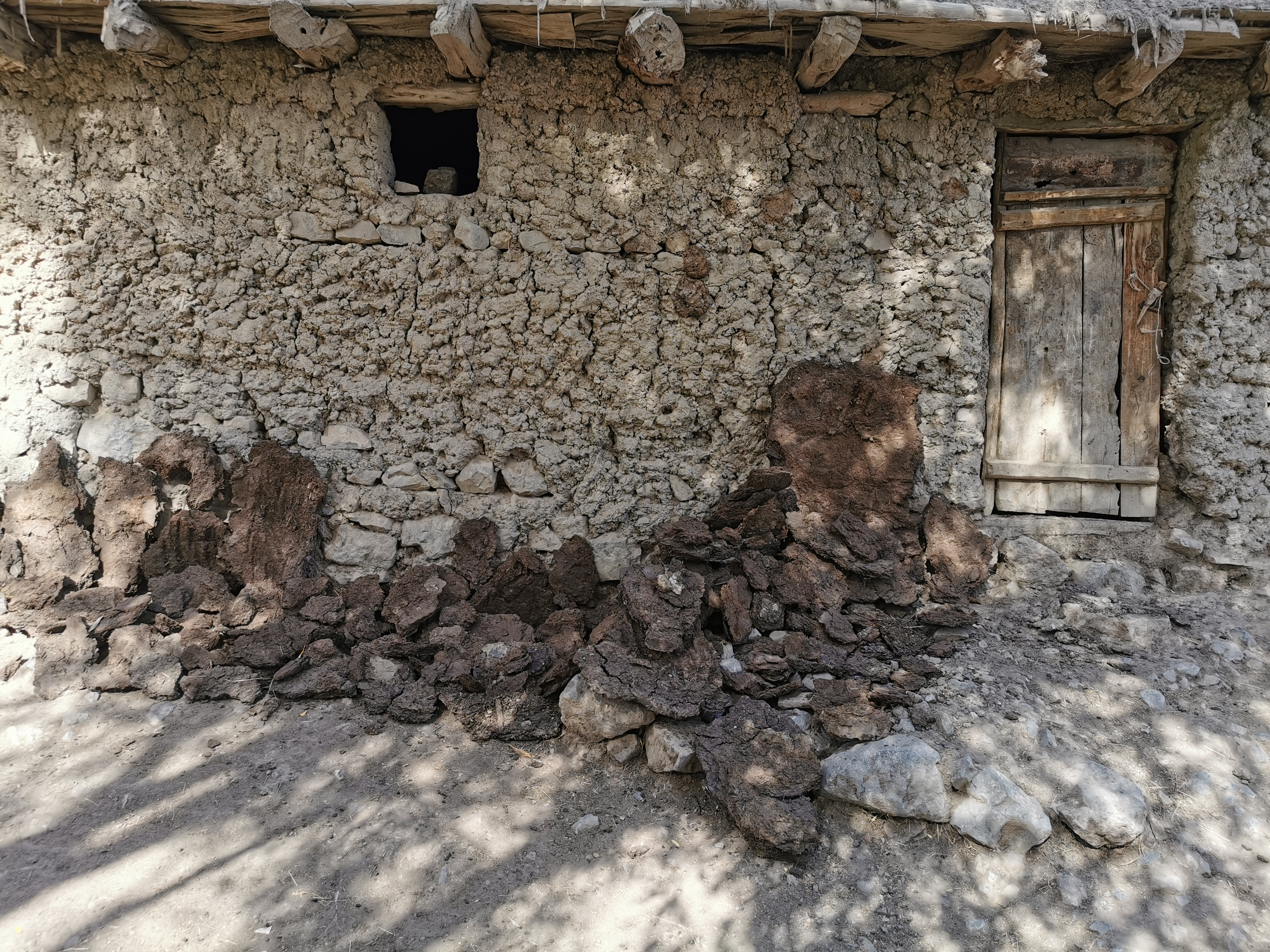
Drying winter fuel

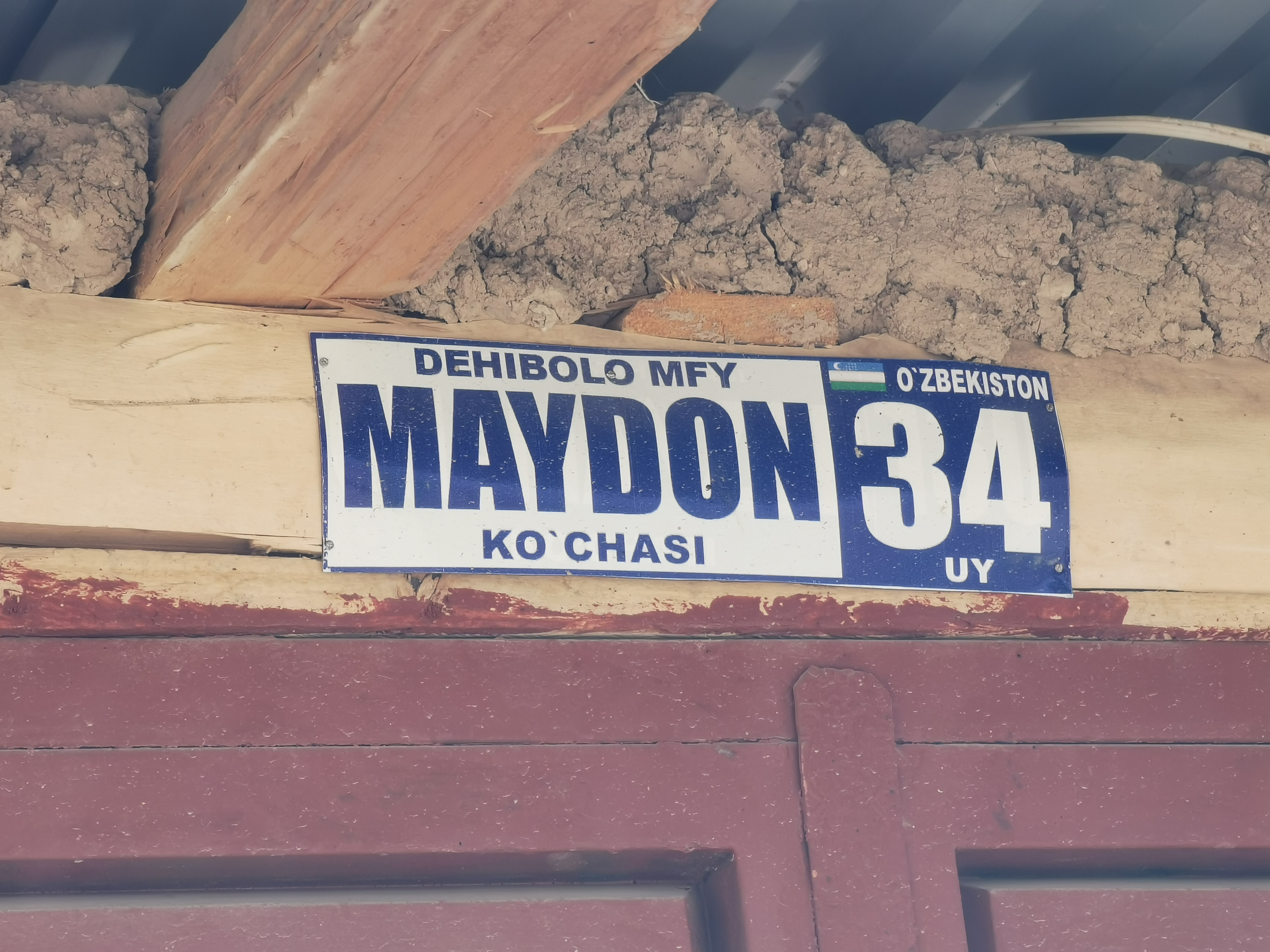
House number sign

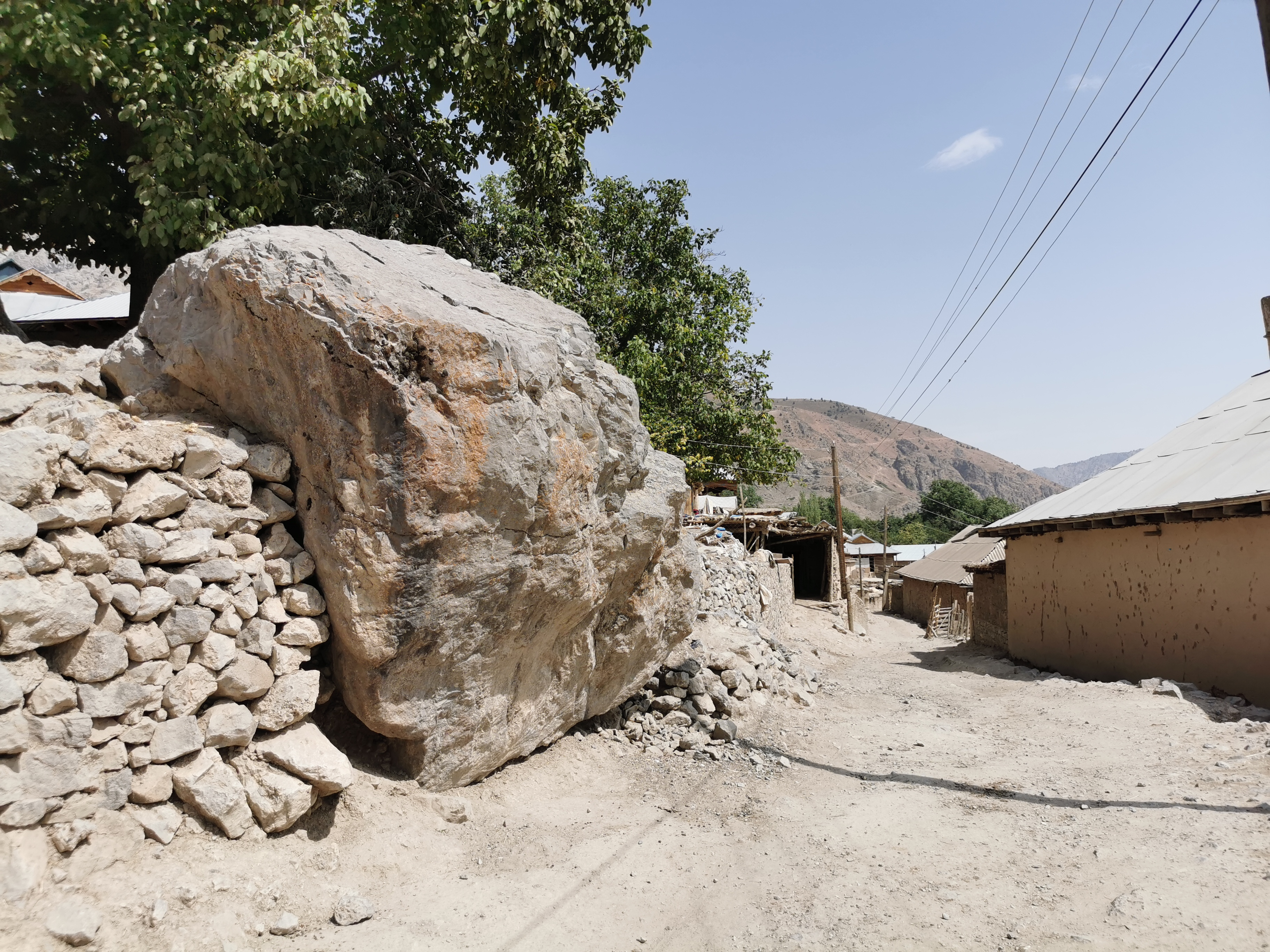
Street with large rock

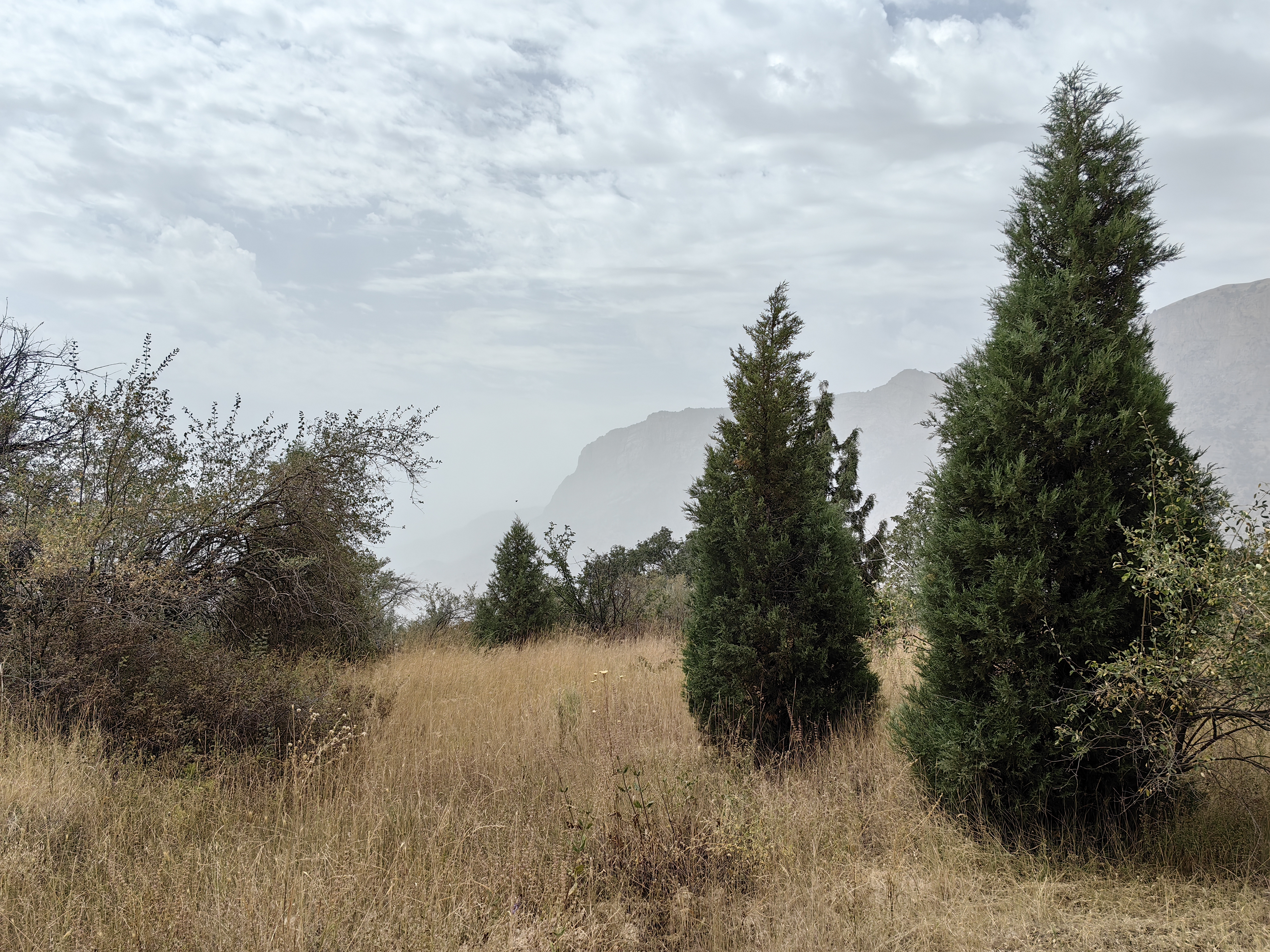
Cemetery

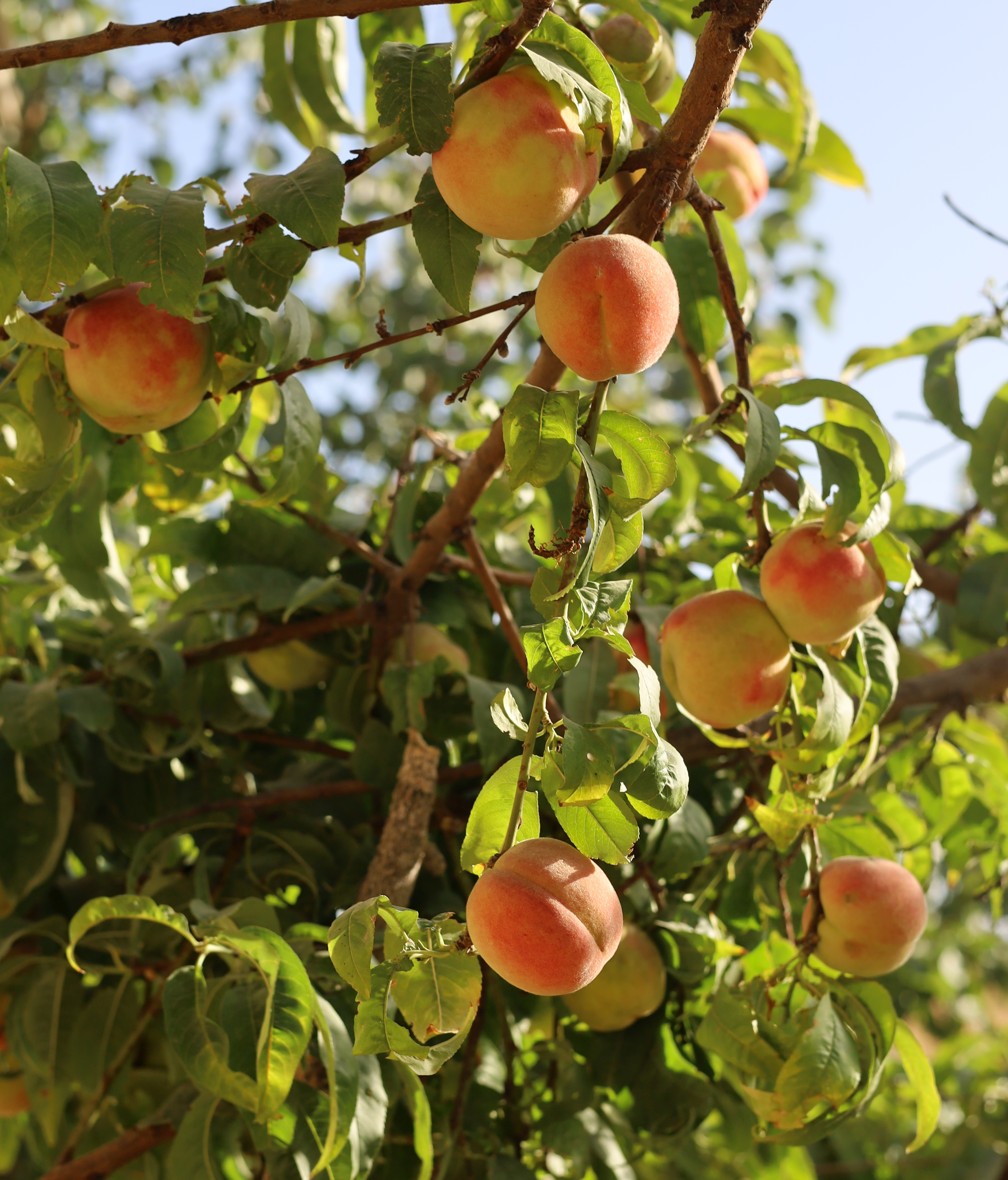
Peaches

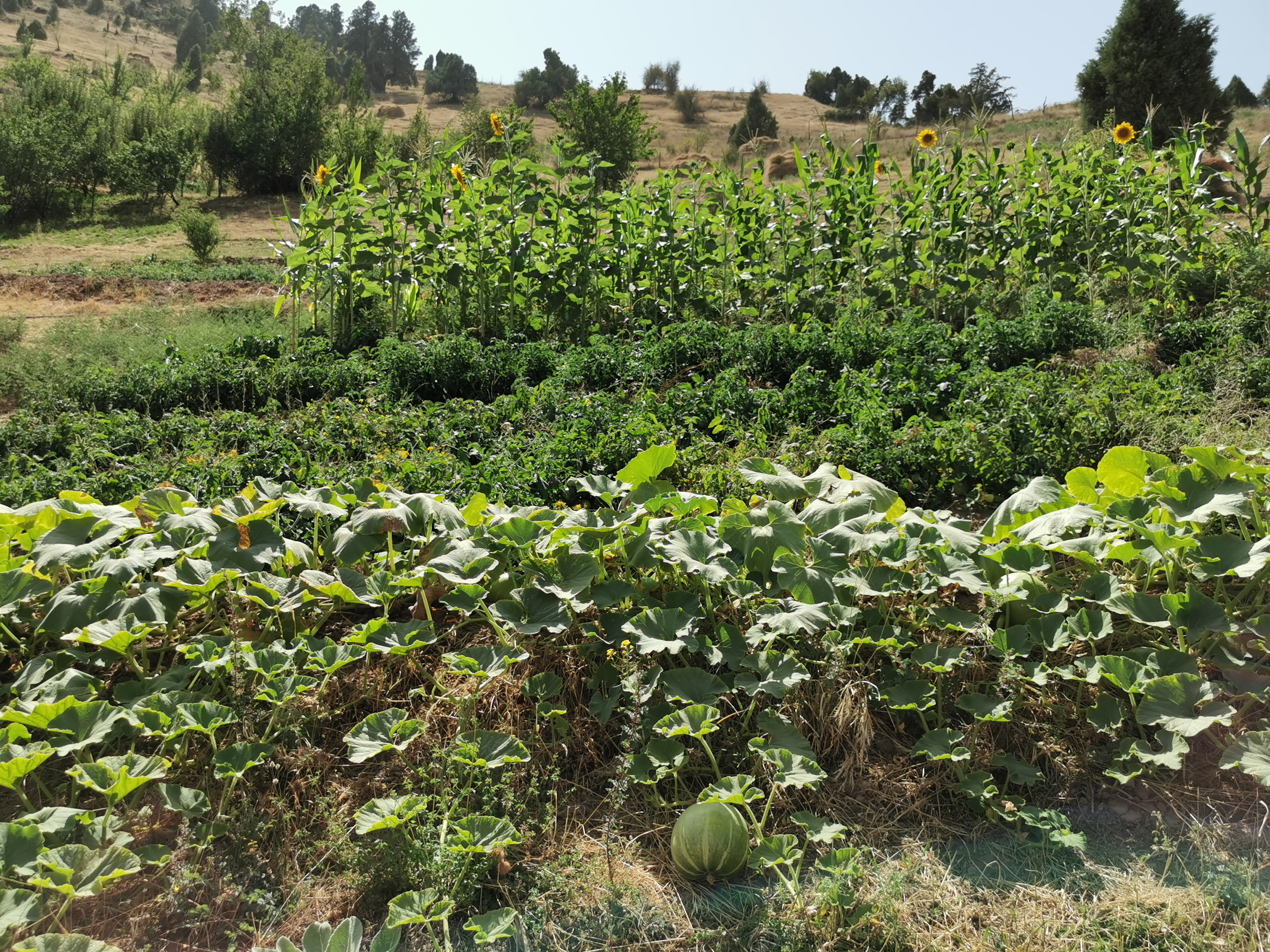
Vegetable field

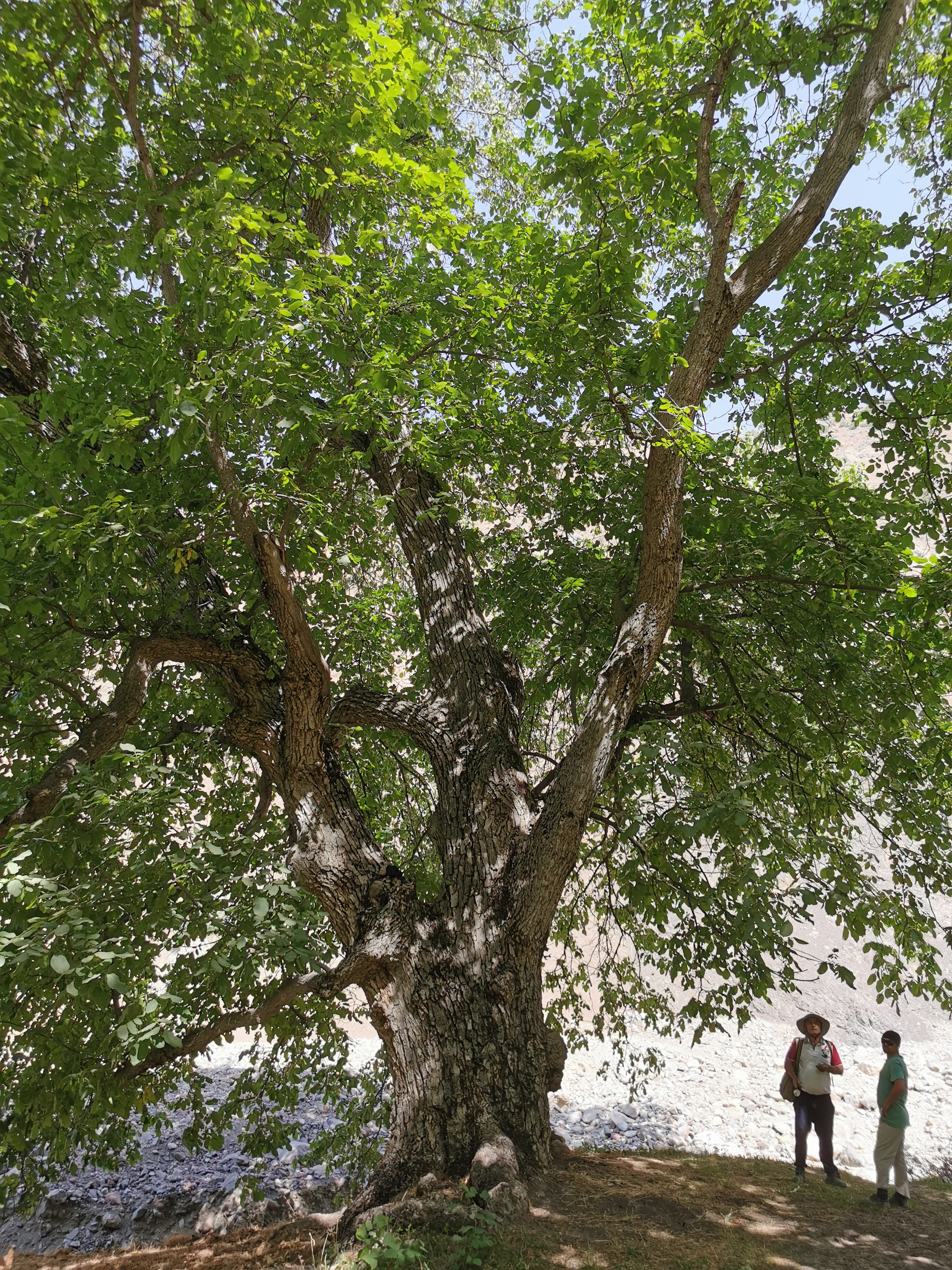
Walnut grove

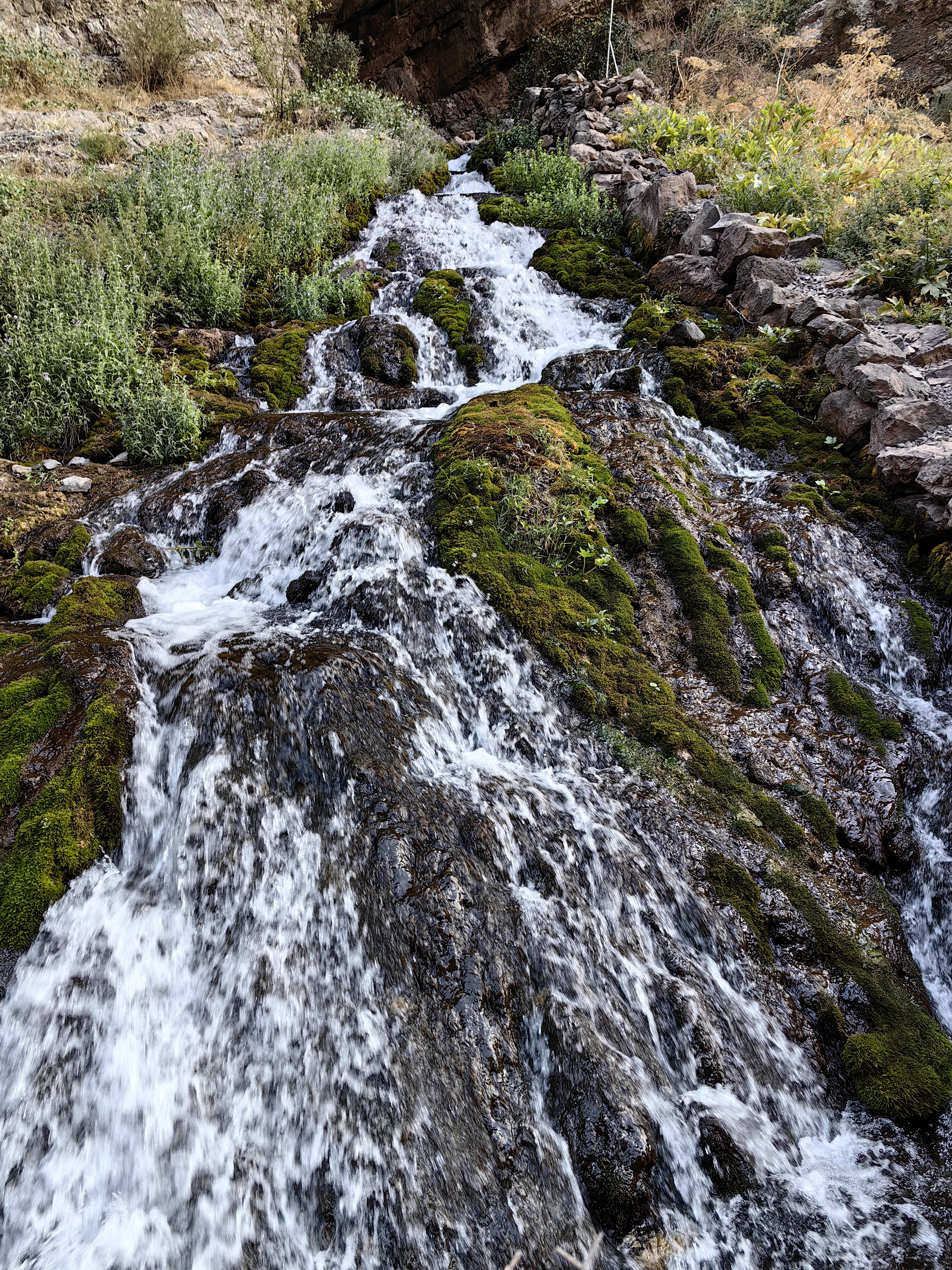
Holtan Chashma source

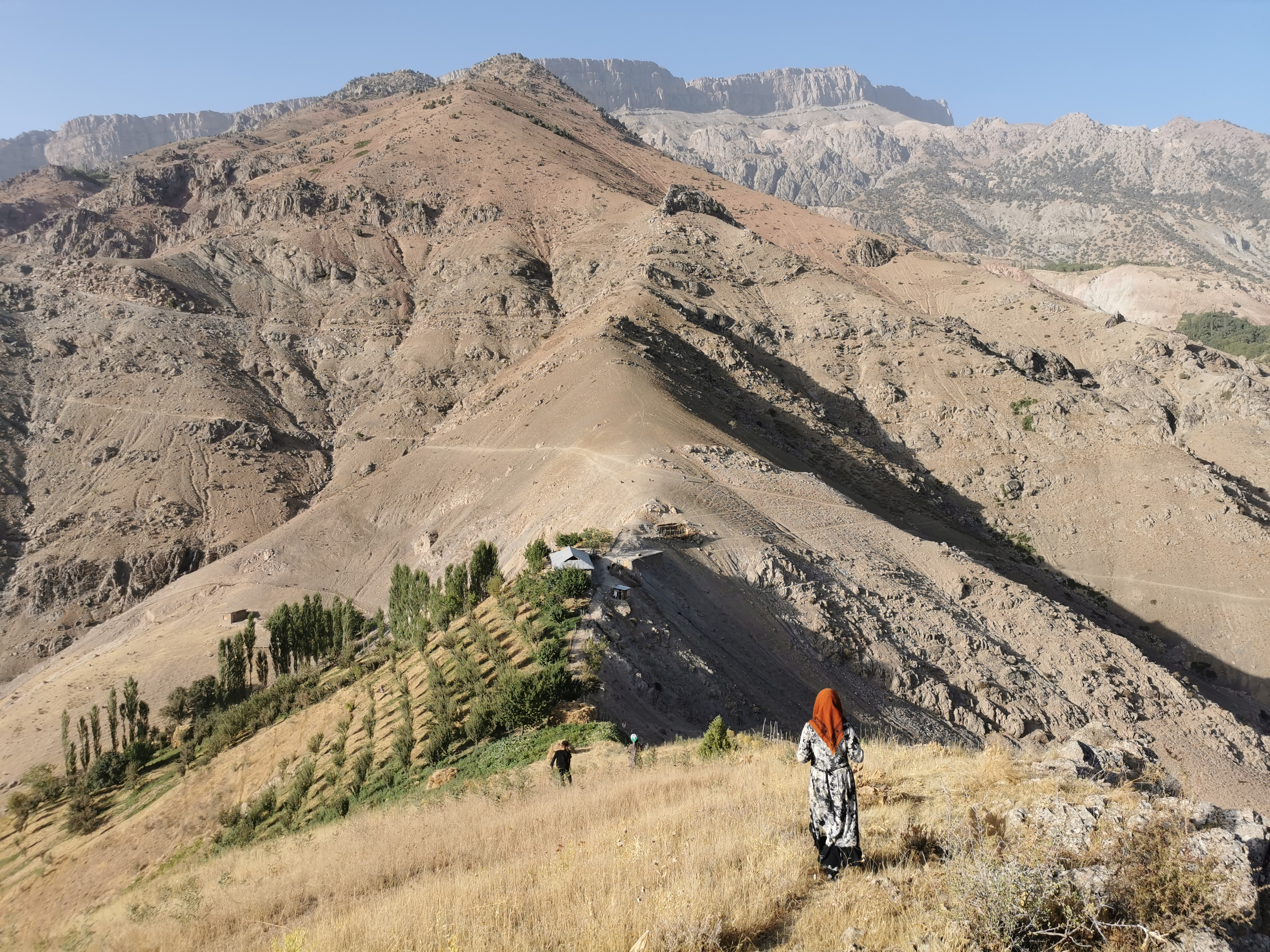
Lonely farm

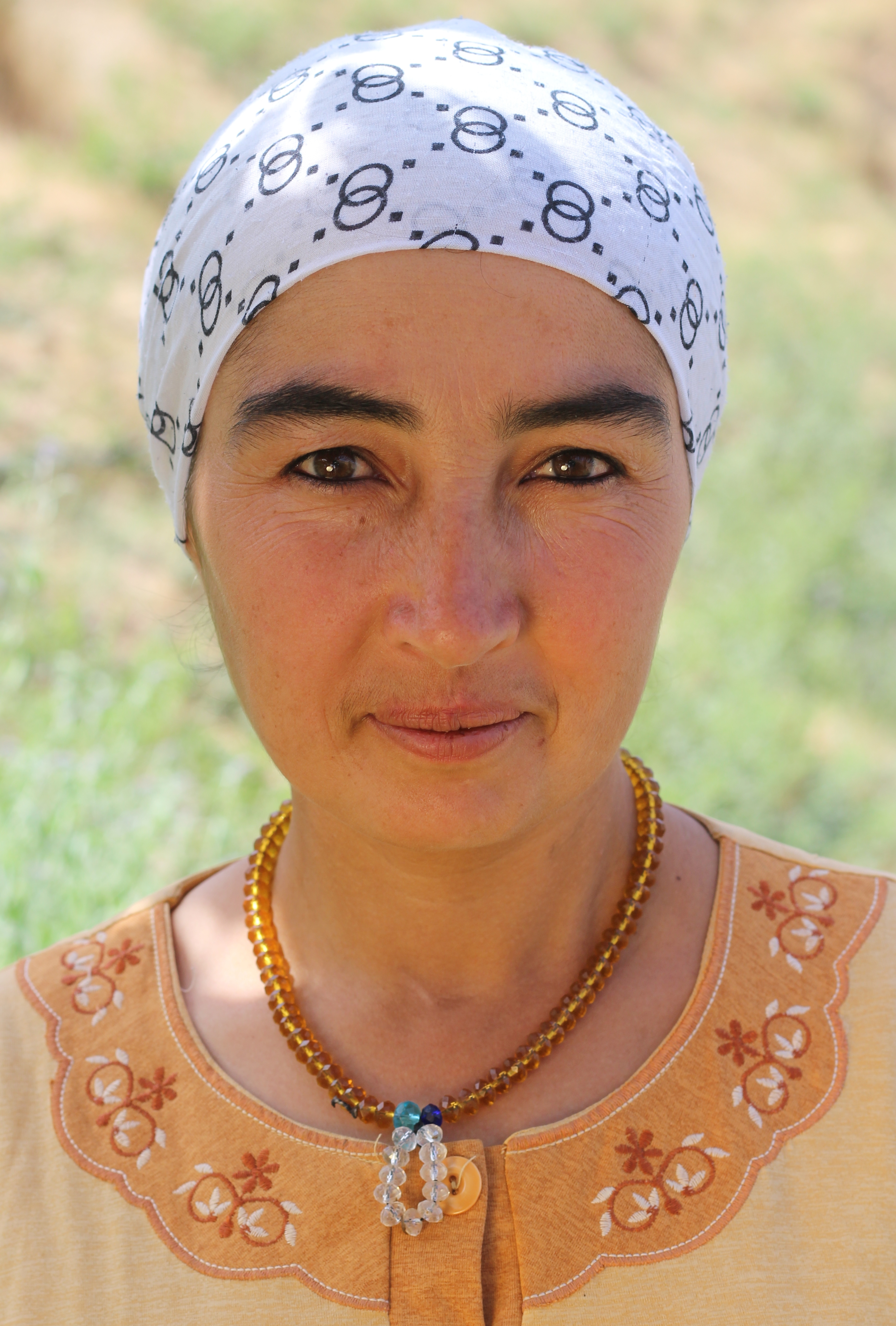
Woman from Dehibolo

== Boybuloq ==
Dehibolo was put on the world map as the starting point to one of the very deep caves of the world, Boybuloq, elevation 2,647 meters, at the end of 1980s.

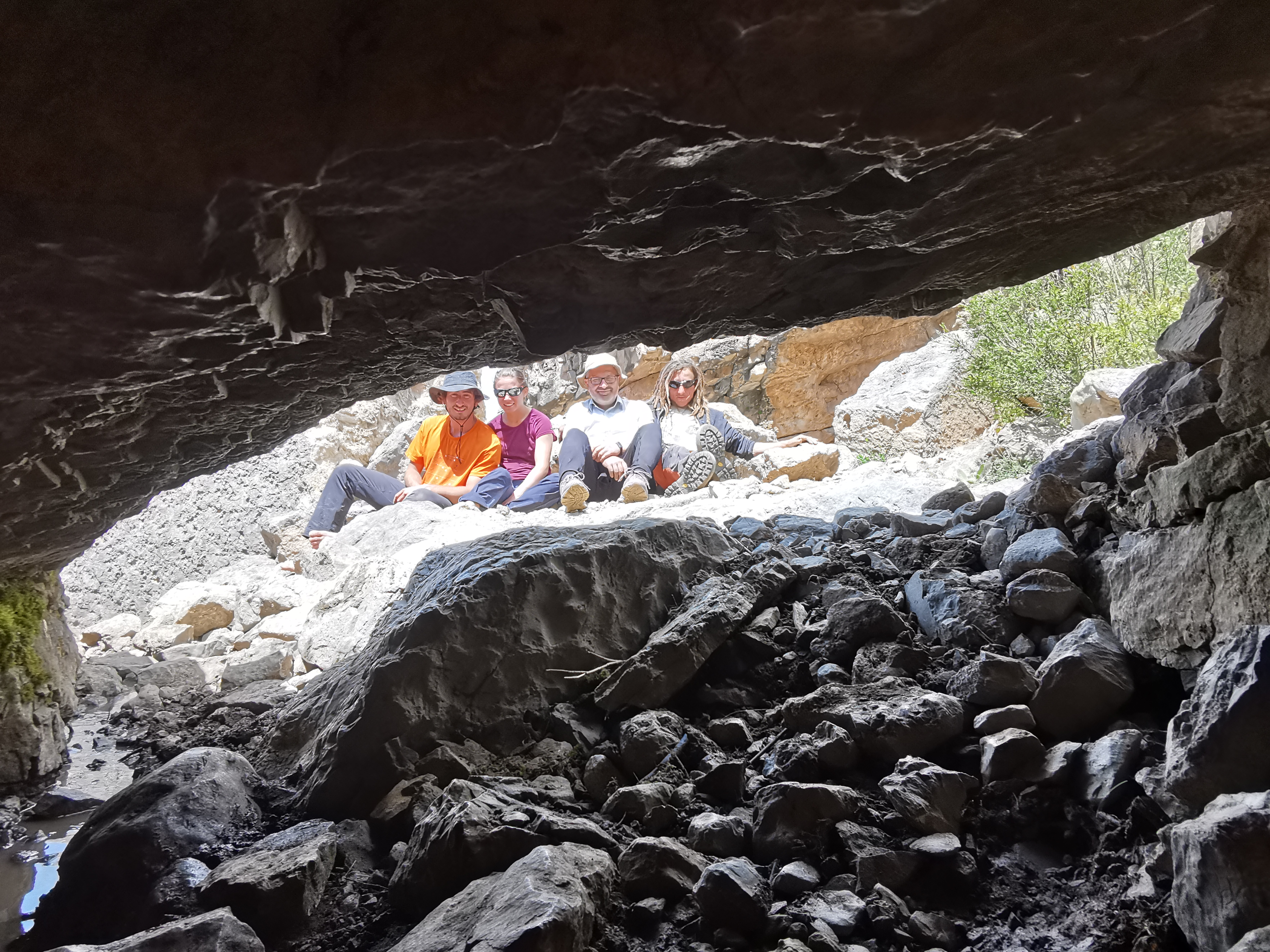
View out of the entrance

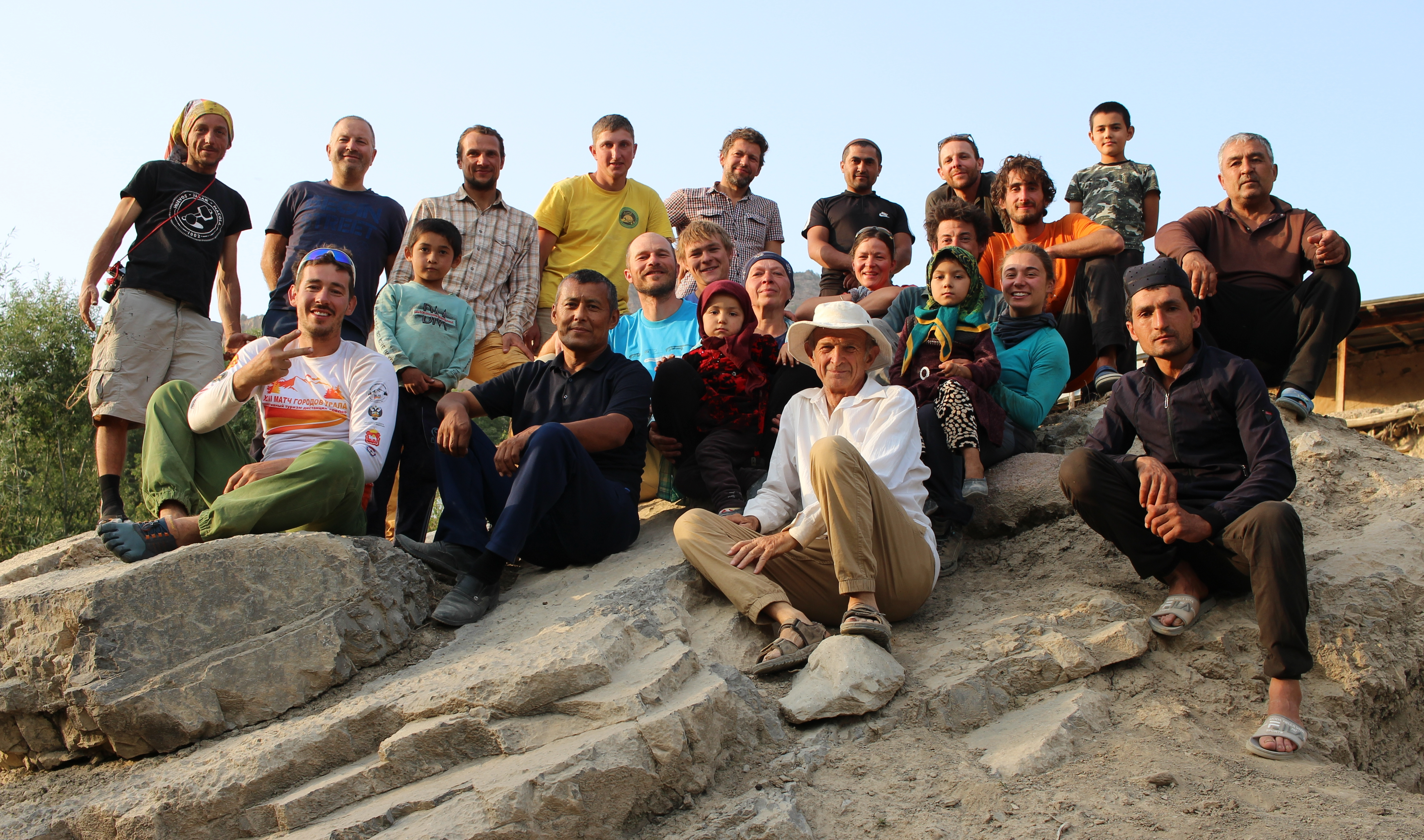
2021 Boybuloq expedition members in Dehibolo

In 1970 Mustafo Holmominov, a farmer and folk healer from Dehibolo, the first known explorer, departed to the cave (a 4-hour trek) with his son. He visited the cave several times before. Mustafo went into the cave alone but never returned. The cave tunnel is difficult to pass and several attempts in the following years to find him failed. In 1985 a group of Russian cavers, part of an expedition by SGS – Ekaterinburg Speleo Club, was scouting the surrounding area for new caves. In Kurgancha they were told the story of Mustafo, they proceeded to Dehibolo and further to the cave. After a high but narrow meander which slowly ascended for 600 meters in straight direction they reached a 27 meters deep pit and at the bottom of it found the remains of Mustafo. In the following summers large expeditions followed, by SGS and ASU – Assoсiation of Ural speleologists, with participation of Italian and British cavers. In 1987 Mustafo's remains were returned to his family, and in 1992 the depth (difference between the highest and the lowest point of the cave) of 1,415 meters (1,158 meters downwards, 257 meters upwards) was reached. It made the cave the deepest cave in Central Asia.

The events which followed the dissolution of the Soviet Union in 1991 and the closure of southern Uzbekistan to foreigners because of overflights of American war planes from the Karshi-Khanabad Air Base (150 km NW of Dehibolo) from 2001 to 2005 during the war in Afghanistan hampered further speleological work in Boybuloq. Focus of SGS and ASU expeditions to Uzbekistan, which resumed in 2007, shifted from Chul-Bair to neighbouring mountain ridge, Hodja-Gur-Gur-Ata. In 2015 part of such expedition examined the Chul-Bair ridge above Dehibolo from below and from the ridge edge and discovered several caves of which the most promising had the entrance at elevation of 2,522 meters. Later it was named after Aleksandr Višnevskij, longtime leader of expeditions to Boybuloq in previous years, and till 2024 explored to a depth of 1,283 meters. In 2021 Boybuloq depth was increased to 1,430 meters and in 2023 to 1,517 meters. It made Boybuloq one of the deepest caves in the world. Of great importance to Dehibolo is the fact that the tunnels of Boybuloq and Višnevskij caves are part of the same cave network (intercave distance is less than 100 meters) which, once the connection between the two caves is established, would be 2,033 meters deep and would make, as of 2024, the third deepest cave in the world.

== Boybuloq Gallery ==
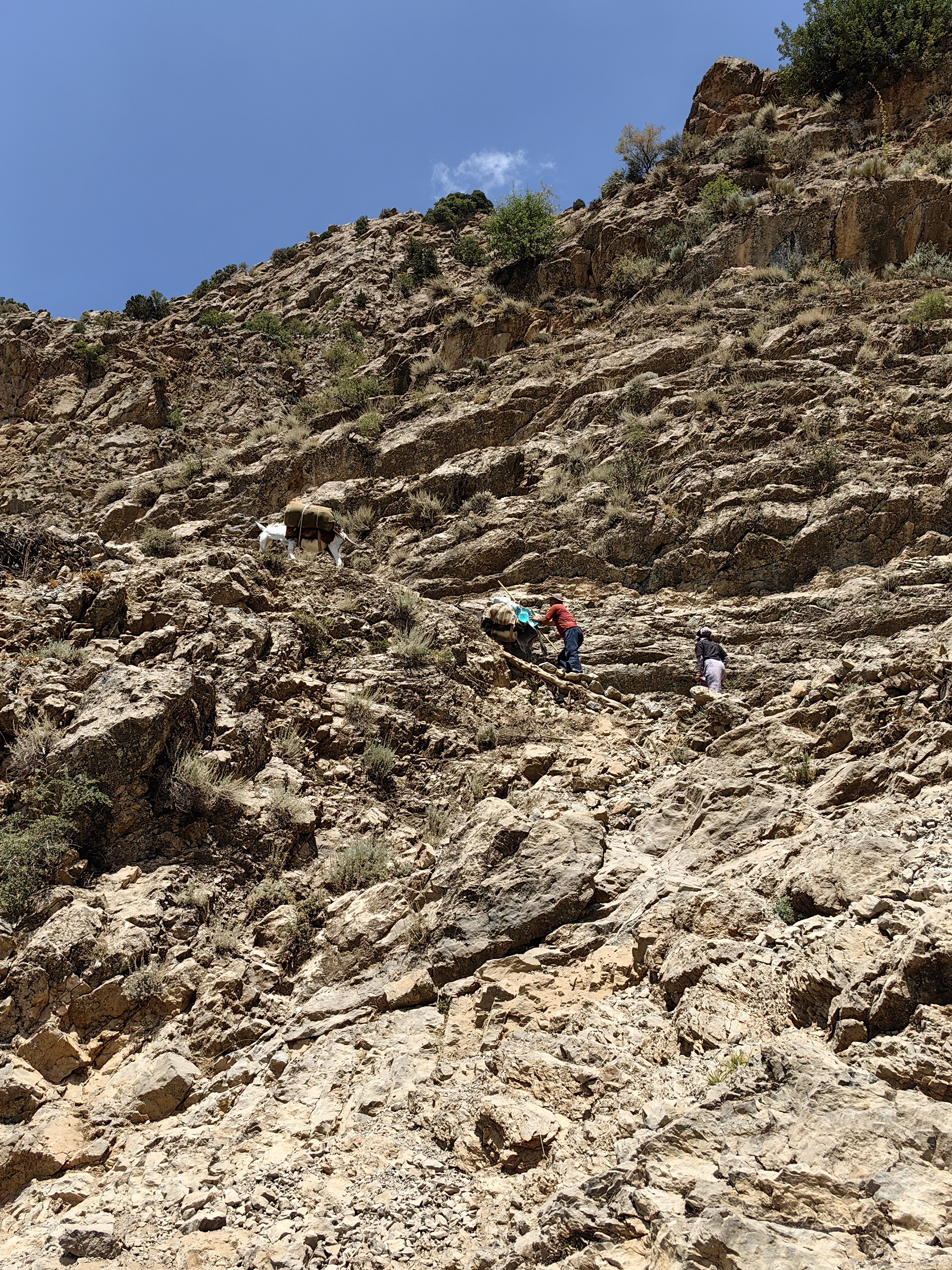
North trail to the cave

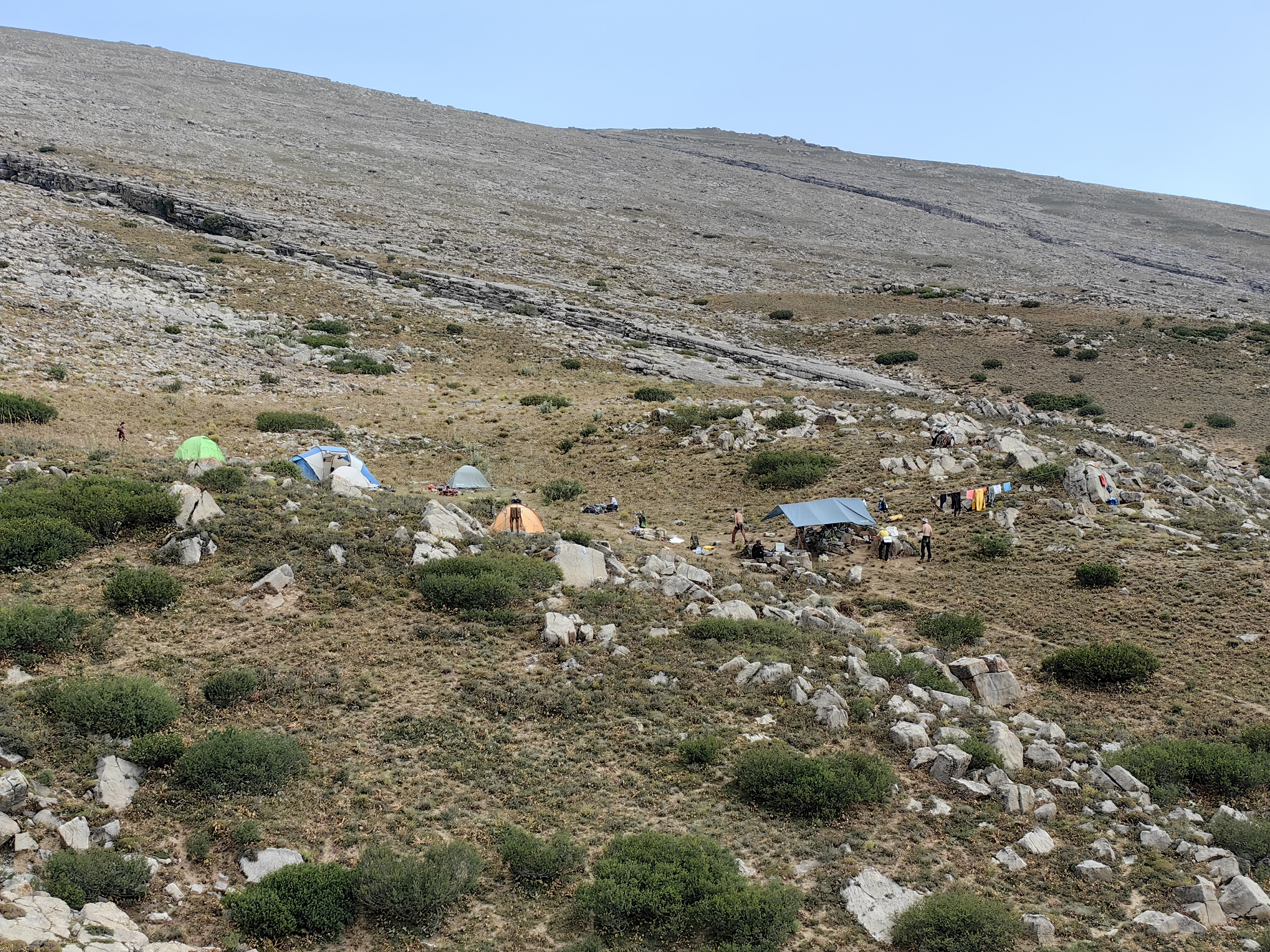
Expedition camp

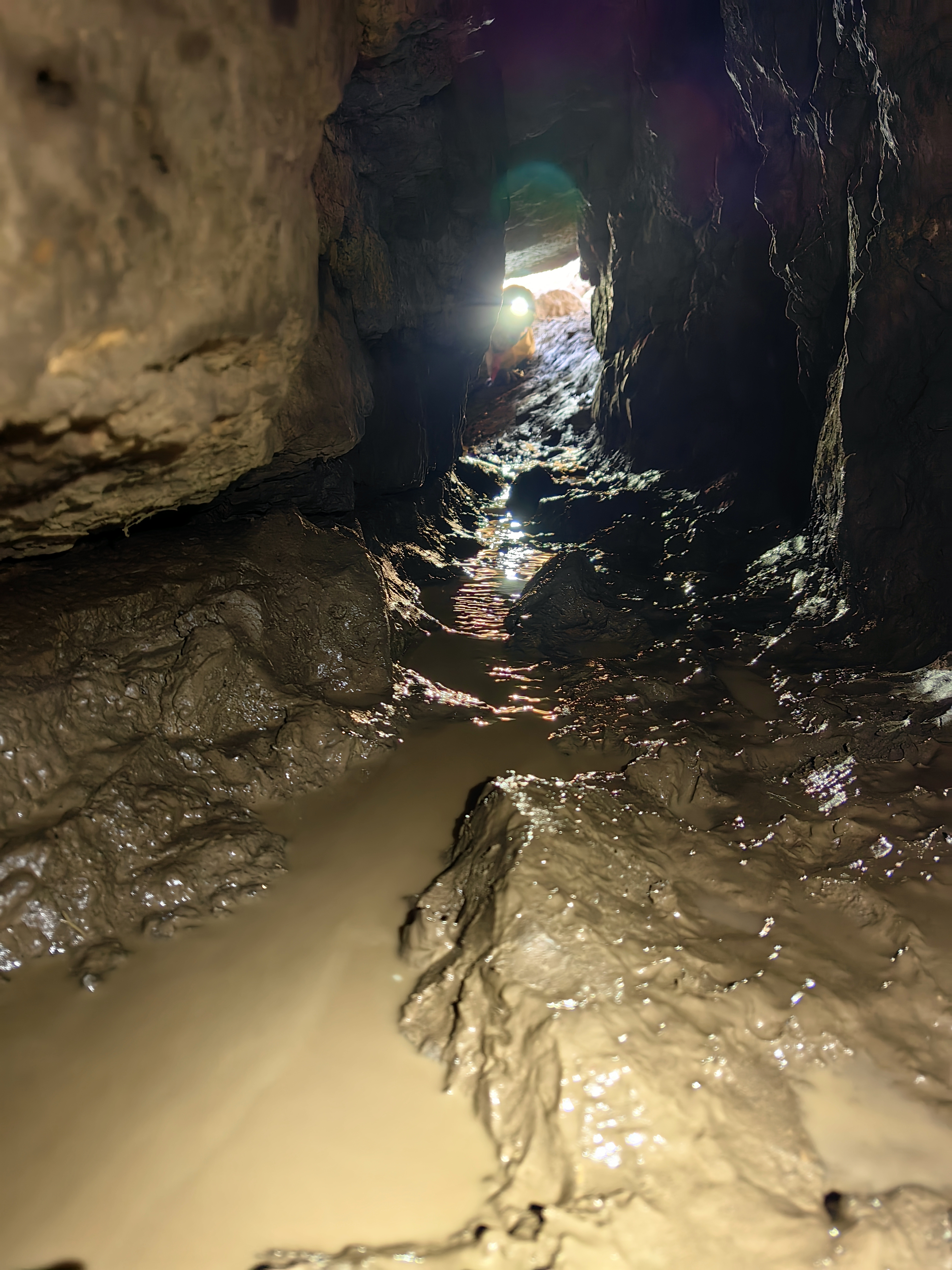
Entrance passage

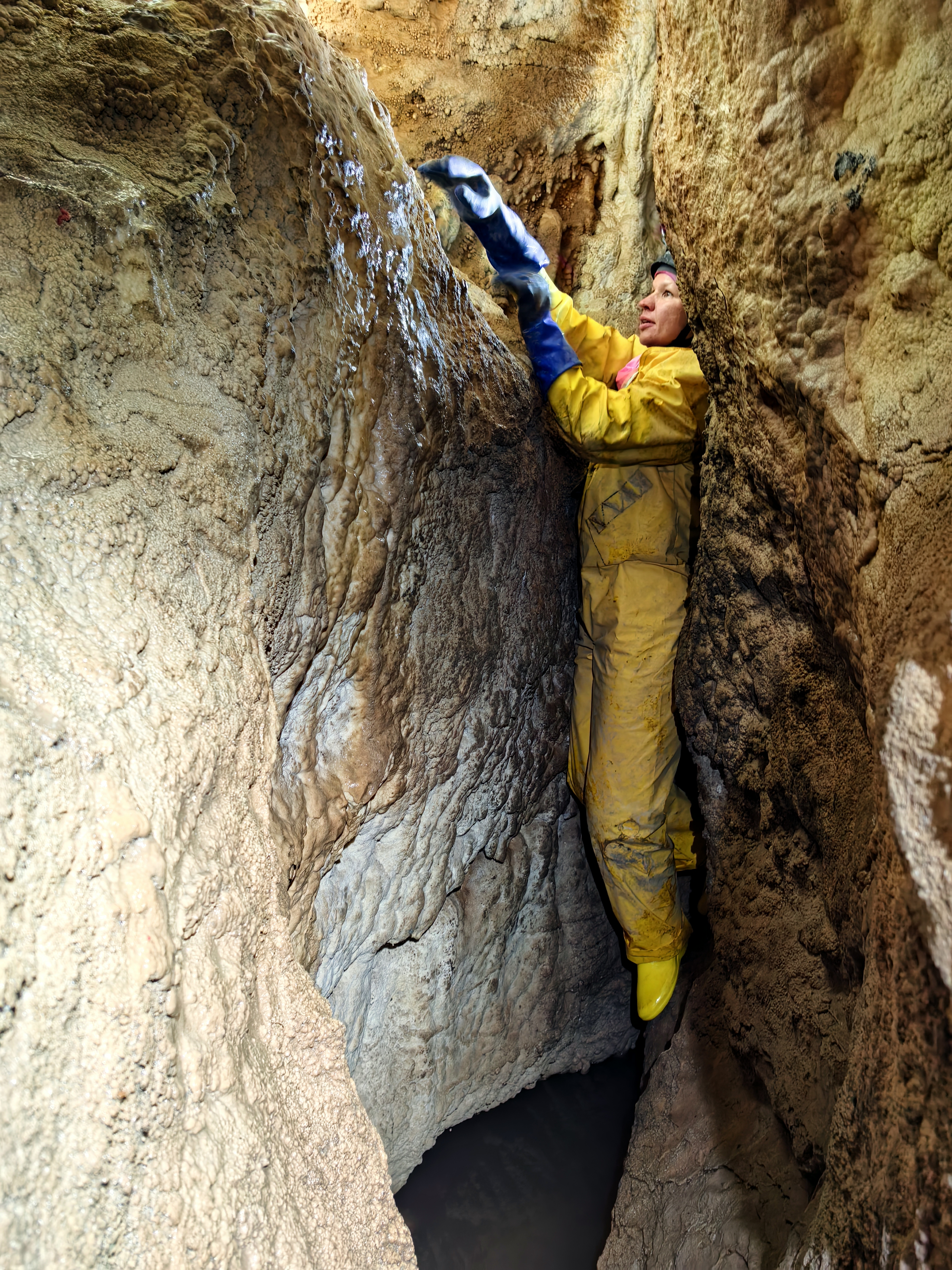
Meander bottom

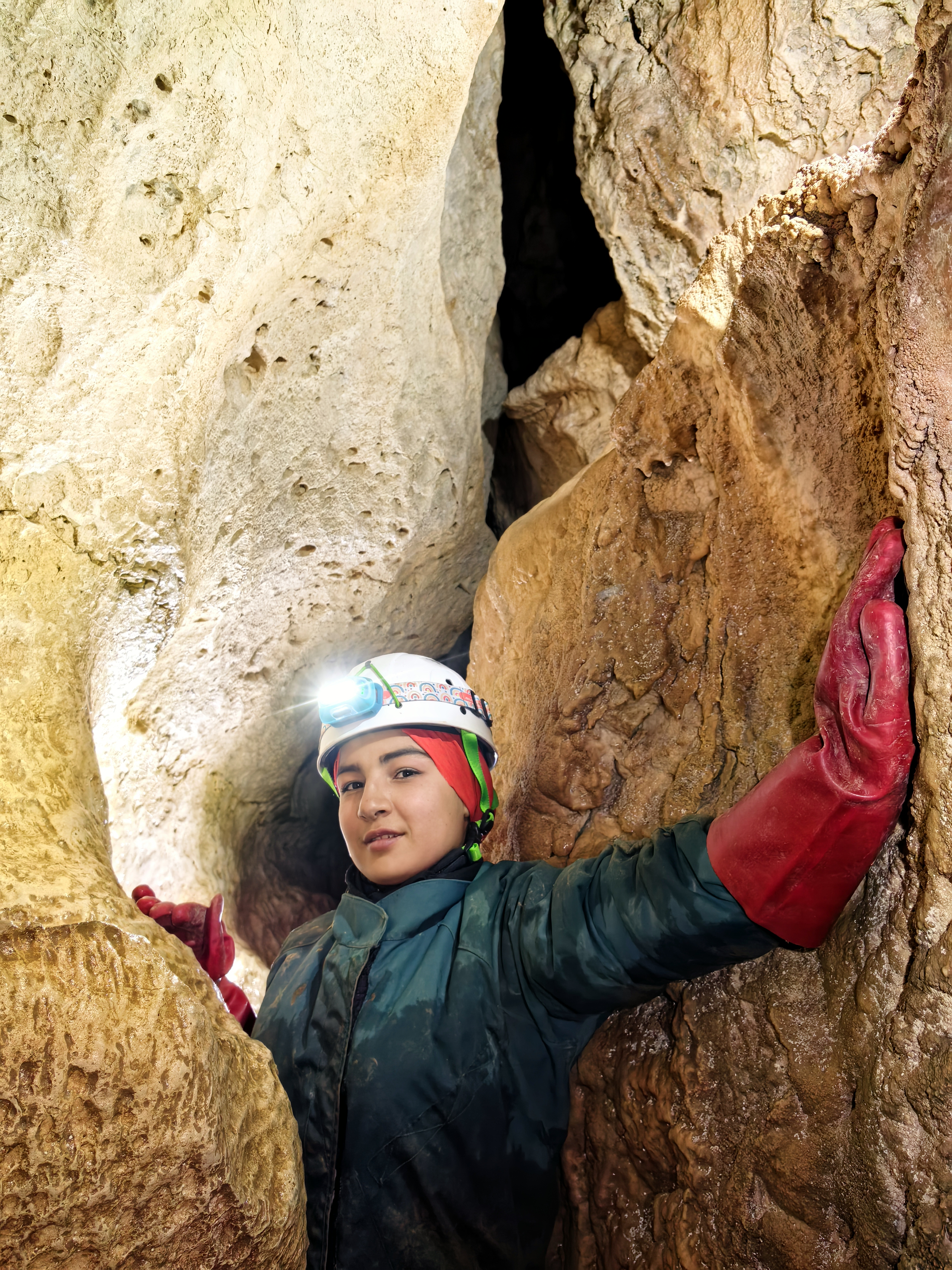
Middle of the meander

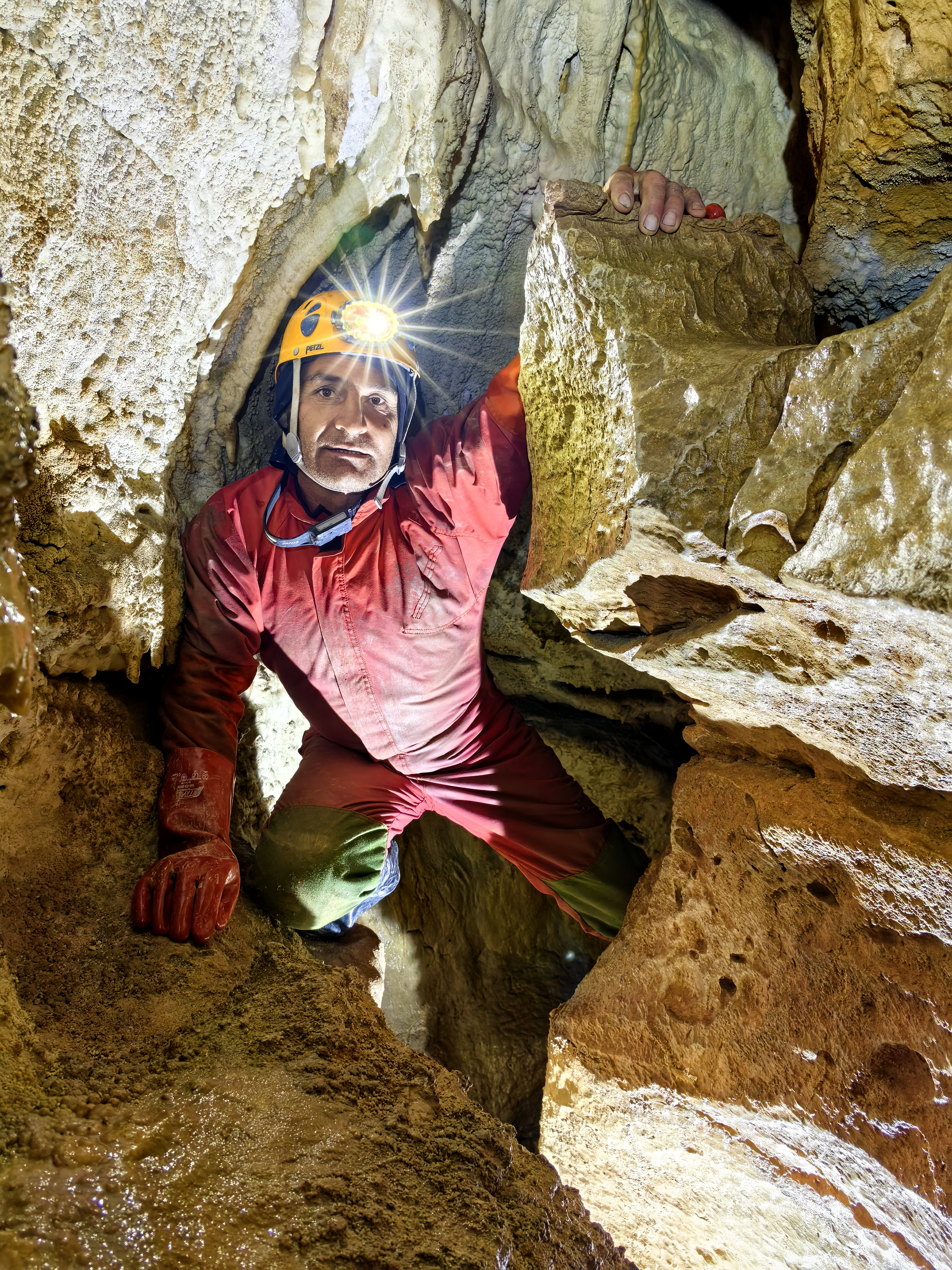
Top of the meander

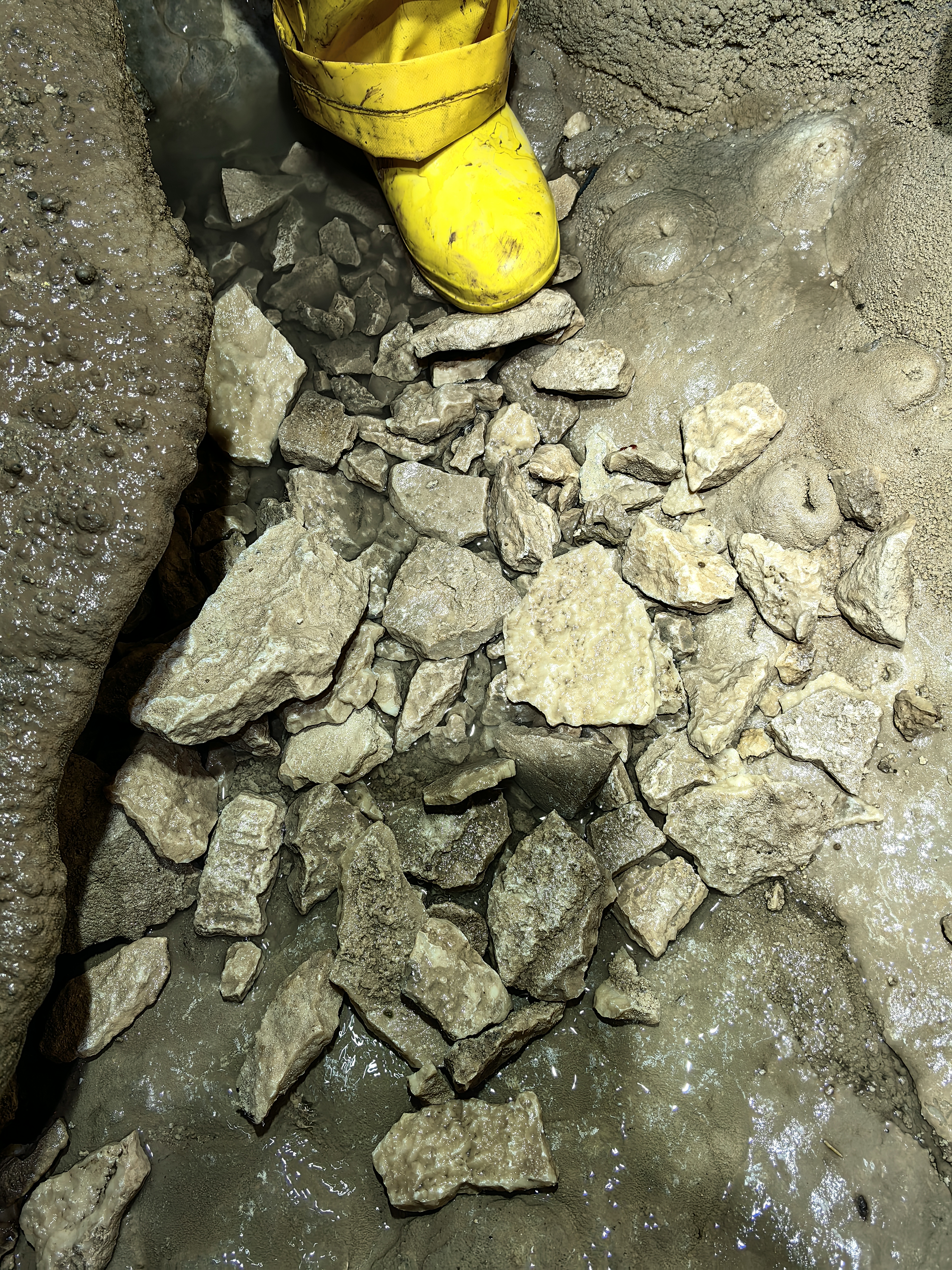
Gravel bottom

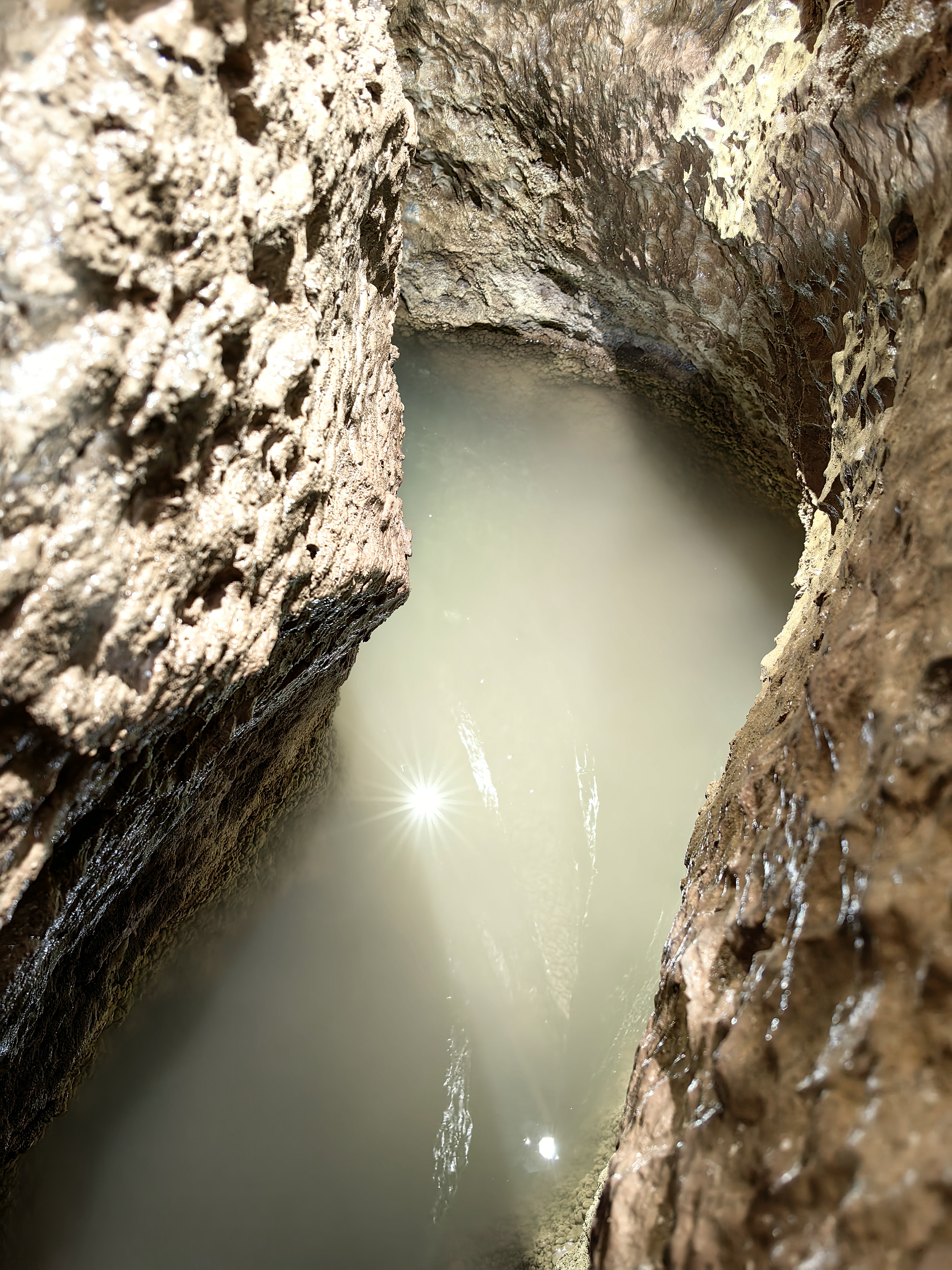
Water pool

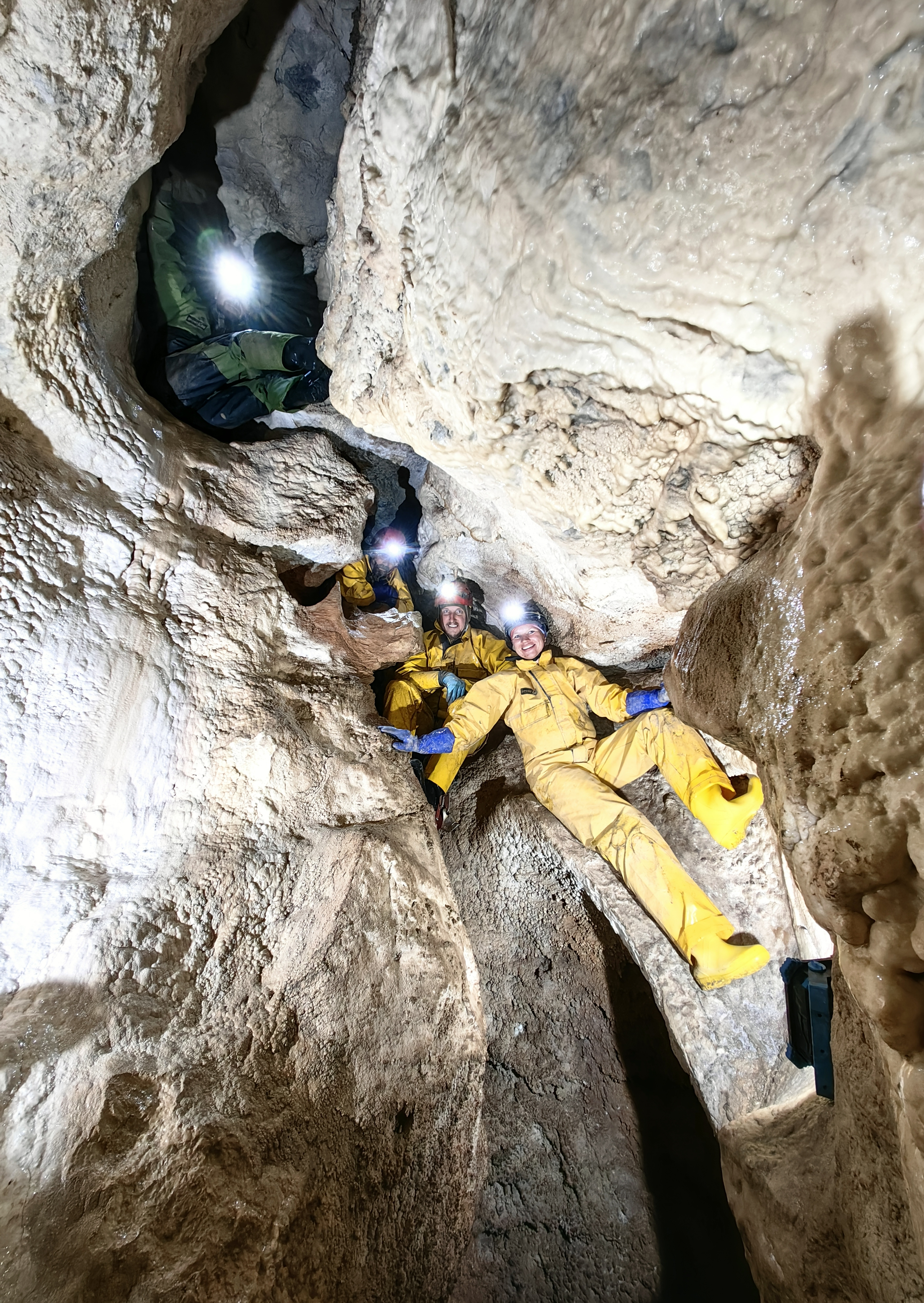
Meander hall

A selection of photos, taken during a visit to the cave in August 2024, in time of the Chul-Bair 2024 expedition, is available here. More photos of the cave are included in the article about Boybuloq.
