= Zemo Okrokana =

Zemo Okrokana ზემო ოქროყანა
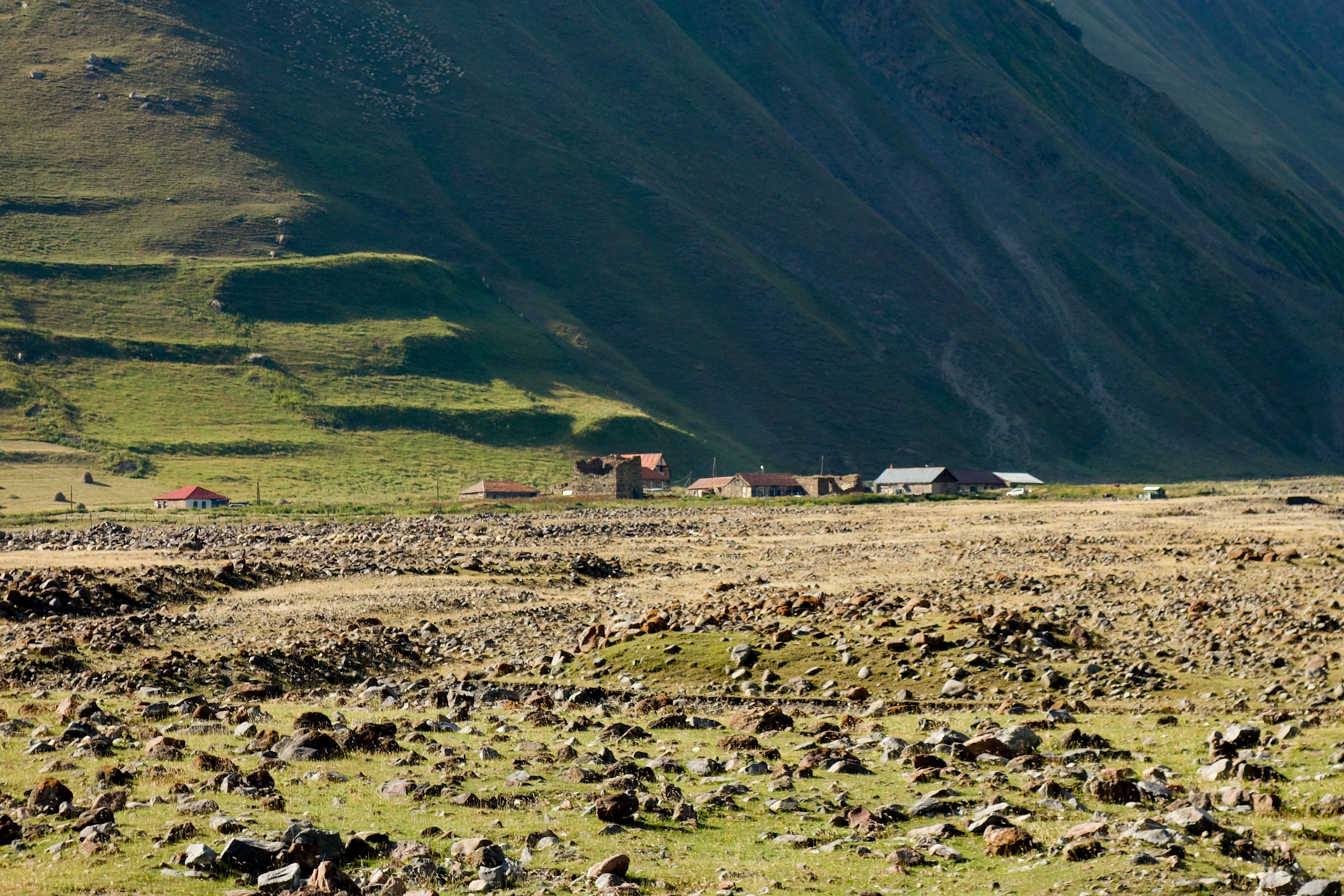
- Village Zemo Okrokana in August, 2017
- Interactive map of Zemo Okrokana
- Location within Georgia Location within Mtskheta-Mtianeti
- Coordinates: 42°35′11″N 44°27′57″E
- Country: Georgia
- Mkhare: Mtskheta-Mtianeti
- Municipality: Kazbegi
- Community: Kobi
- Elevation: 2,080 m (6,820 ft)

Population (2014)
  - Total: 0
- Time zone: UTC+4 (Georgian Time)

Zemo Okrokana (Georgian: ზემო ოქროყანა, literally — "Upper Golden Field") is a village in the historical region of Khevi, north-eastern Georgia. It is located on the right bank of the Tergi tributary river – Mnaisi. Administratively, it is part of the Kazbegi Municipality in Mtskheta-Mtianeti. Its distance to the municipality center Stepantsminda is 24 km.

Okrokana is a possible starting point for the popular hike into Truso Valley, along the Terek River.

== Sources ==
- "ზემო ოქროყანა" (PDF). Georgian Soviet Encyclopedia (in Georgian). Vol. 4. Tbilisi. 1979. p. 510.
