= Suatisi =

Suatisi სუათისი
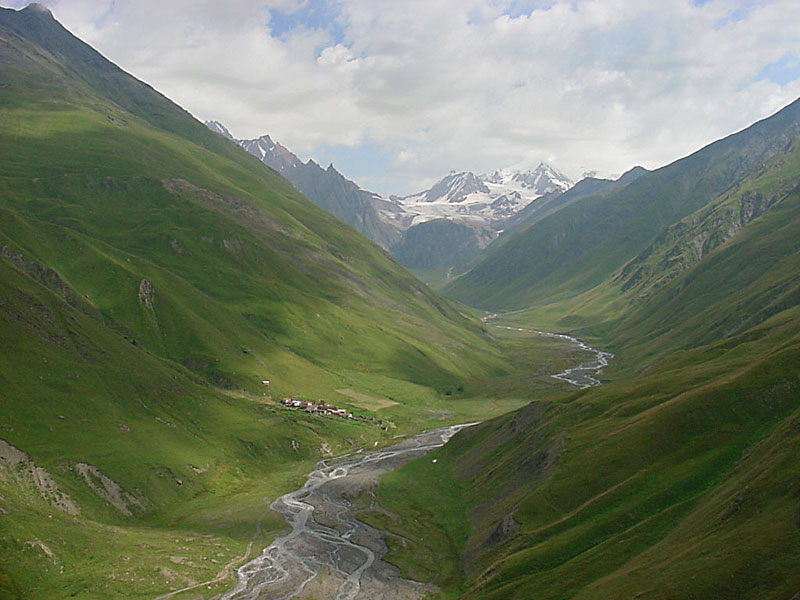
- Village of Suatisi and Suatisi Valley
- Interactive map of Suatisi
- Location within Georgia Location within Mtskheta-Mtianeti
- Coordinates: 42°37′50″N 44°22′56″E
- Country: Georgia
- Mkhare: Mtskheta-Mtianeti
- Municipality: Kazbegi
- Community: Kobi
- Elevation: 2,320 m (7,610 ft)

Population (2014)
  - Total: 0
- Time zone: UTC+4 (Georgian Time)

Suatisi (Georgian: სუათისი) is a hamlet in the Truso Gorge, part of the historical region of Khevi, north-eastern Georgia. It is located on the right bank of the eponymous river Suatisi, on the southern slopes of the Khokh Range. Administratively, it is part of the Kazbegi Municipality in Mtskheta-Mtianeti. Distance to the municipality center Stepantsminda is 38 km. Hamlet was named after the Suatisi mountain, elevation 4,428 m (14,528 ft), located upstream of the Suatisi.

== Population ==
According to the 2014 census, no one lives in the village anymore.

== See also ==
- Suatisi lake
- Suatisi glacier

== Sources ==
- Georgian Soviet Encyclopedia, V. 9, p. 588, Tbilisi, 1985 year.
