= Burmasigi =

Burmasigi ბურმასიგი
- Interactive map of Burmasigi
- Location within Georgia Location within Mtskheta-Mtianeti
- Coordinates: 42°37′46″N 44°20′20″E
- Country: Georgia
- Mkhare: Mtskheta-Mtianeti
- Municipality: Kazbegi
- Community: Kobi
- Elevation: 2,350 m (7,710 ft)

Population (2014)
  - Total: 0
- Time zone: UTC+4 (Georgian Time)

Burmasigi (Georgian: ბურმასიგი; Iron Ossetic: Бурмæсыг, Burmæsyg — ″yellow tower″) is a village in the historical region of Khevi, north-eastern Georgia. It is located on the left bank of the river Tergi, on the southern slopes of the Khokhi Range. Administratively, it is part of the Kazbegi Municipality in Mtskheta-Mtianeti. Distance to the municipality center Stepantsminda is 41 km.

== Sources ==
- Georgian Soviet Encyclopedia, V. 2, p. 580, Tbilisi, 1977 year.
