= Almasiani =

Almasiani ალმასიანი
- Interactive map of Almasiani
- Location within Georgia Location within Mtskheta-Mtianeti
- Coordinates: 42°33′26″N 44°29′58″E
- Country: Georgia
- Mkhare: Mtskheta-Mtianeti
- Municipality: Kazbegi
- Community: Kobi
- Elevation: 1,960 m (6,430 ft)

Population (2014)
  - Total: 22
- Time zone: UTC+4 (Georgian Time)

Almasiani (Georgian: ალმასიანი) is a village on the Kobi Plateau, part of the historical region of Khevi, north-eastern Georgia. It is located on the banks of the river Tergi and its right bank tributary river Bidara. Administratively, it is part of the Kazbegi Municipality in Mtskheta-Mtianeti. Distance to the municipality center Stepantsminda is 18 km.

== Climate ==
Climate data for Almasiani
Month	Jan	Feb	Mar	Apr	May	Jun	Jul	Aug	Sep	Oct	Nov	Dec	Year
Mean daily maximum °C (°F)	−2.7 (27.1)	−2.5 (27.5)	1.3 (34.3)	7.2 (45.0)	12.5 (54.5)	15.9 (60.6)	18.5 (65.3)	18.6 (65.5)	15.1 (59.2)	10.3 (50.5)	3.5 (38.3)	−0.7 (30.7)	8.1 (46.5)
Daily mean °C (°F)	−7.5 (18.5)	−7.2 (19.0)	−3.4 (25.9)	1.5 (34.7)	6.6 (43.9)	9.7 (49.5)	12.1 (53.8)	12.2 (54.0)	8.4 (47.1)	4.5 (40.1)	−1 (30)	−5.1 (22.8)	2.6 (36.6)
Mean daily minimum °C (°F)	−12.2 (10.0)	−11.9 (10.6)	−8 (18)	−4.1 (24.6)	0.8 (33.4)	3.5 (38.3)	5.8 (42.4)	5.9 (42.6)	1.8 (35.2)	−1.2 (29.8)	−5.4 (22.3)	−9.5 (14.9)	−2.9 (26.8)
Average precipitation mm (inches)	33 (1.3)	40 (1.6)	64 (2.5)	102 (4.0)	143 (5.6)	133 (5.2)	122 (4.8)	135 (5.3)	81 (3.2)	67 (2.6)	61 (2.4)	39 (1.5)	1,020 (40)

== Sources ==
- Georgian Soviet Encyclopedia, V. 1, p. 319, Tbilisi, 1975 year.
