= Kartsopheli =

Kartsopheli კართსოფელი
- Interactive map of Kartsopheli
- Location within Georgia Location within Mtskheta-Mtianeti
- Coordinates: 42°37′27″N 44°21′00″E
- Country: Georgia
- Mkhare: Mtskheta-Mtianeti
- Municipality: Kazbegi
- Community: Kobi
- Elevation: 2,060 m (6,760 ft)

Population (2014)
  - Total: 0
- Time zone: UTC+4 (Georgian Time)

Kartsopheli (Georgian: კართსოფელი; Iron Ossetic: Хъаратыхъæу, Qaratyqæw — ″village of the Qaratæ″ ) is a village in the historical region of Khevi, north-eastern Georgia. It is located on the left bank of the river Tergi. Administratively, it is part of the Kazbegi Municipality in Mtskheta-Mtianeti. Distance to the municipality center Stepantsminda is 38 km.

== Sources ==
- Georgian Soviet Encyclopedia, V. 4, p. 404, Tbilisi, 1979 year.
