= Gusalti =

Gusalti გუსალთი
- Interactive map of Gusalti
- Location within Georgia Location within Mtskheta-Mtianeti
- Coordinates: 42°38′22″N 44°19′57″E
- Country: Georgia
- Mkhare: Mtskheta-Mtianeti
- Municipality: Kazbegi
- Community: Kobi
- Elevation: 2,275 m (7,464 ft)

Population (2014)
  - Total: 0
- Time zone: UTC+4 (Georgian Time)

Gusalti (Georgian: გუსალთი; Iron Ossetic: Гусалтæ, Gusaltæ) is a village in the historical region of Khevi, north-eastern Georgia. It is located on the left bank of the river Tergi, on the southern slopes of the Khokhi Range. Administratively, it is part of the Kazbegi Municipality in Mtskheta-Mtianeti. Distance to the municipality center Stepantsminda is 43 km.

== Sources ==
- Georgian Soviet Encyclopedia
- Google Earth
