= Kvemo Okrokana =

Kvemo Okrokana ქვემო ოქროყანა
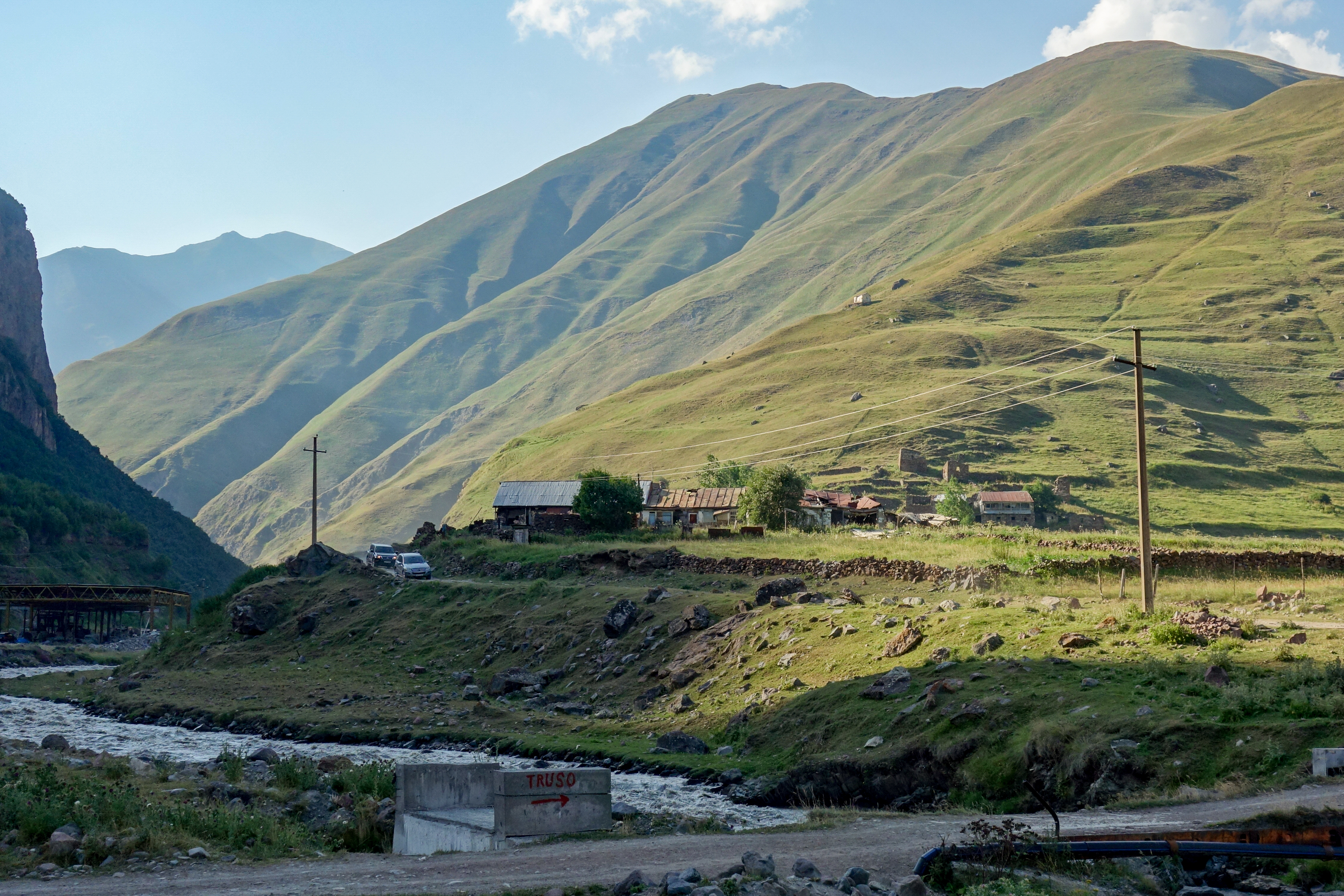
- Village Kvemo Okrokana in the center
- Interactive map of Kvemo Okrokana
- Location within Georgia Location within Mtskheta-Mtianeti
- Coordinates: 42°35′02″N 44°27′44″E
- Country: Georgia
- Mkhare: Mtskheta-Mtianeti
- Municipality: Kazbegi
- Community: Kobi
- Elevation: 2,000 m (6,600 ft)

Population (2014)
  - Total: 1
- Time zone: UTC+4 (Georgian Time)

Kvemo Okrokana (Georgian: ქვემო ოქროყანა, literally — "Lower Golden Field") is a village in the Truso Gorge, part of the historical region of Khevi, north-eastern Georgia. It is located on the left bank of the river Tergi. Administratively, it is part of the Kazbegi Municipality in Mtskheta-Mtianeti. It is 25 km from the municipality center of Stepantsminda.

== Sources ==
- Georgian Soviet Encyclopedia, V. 10, p. 515, Tbilisi, 1986 year.
