= Shevardeni =

Shevardeni შევარდენი
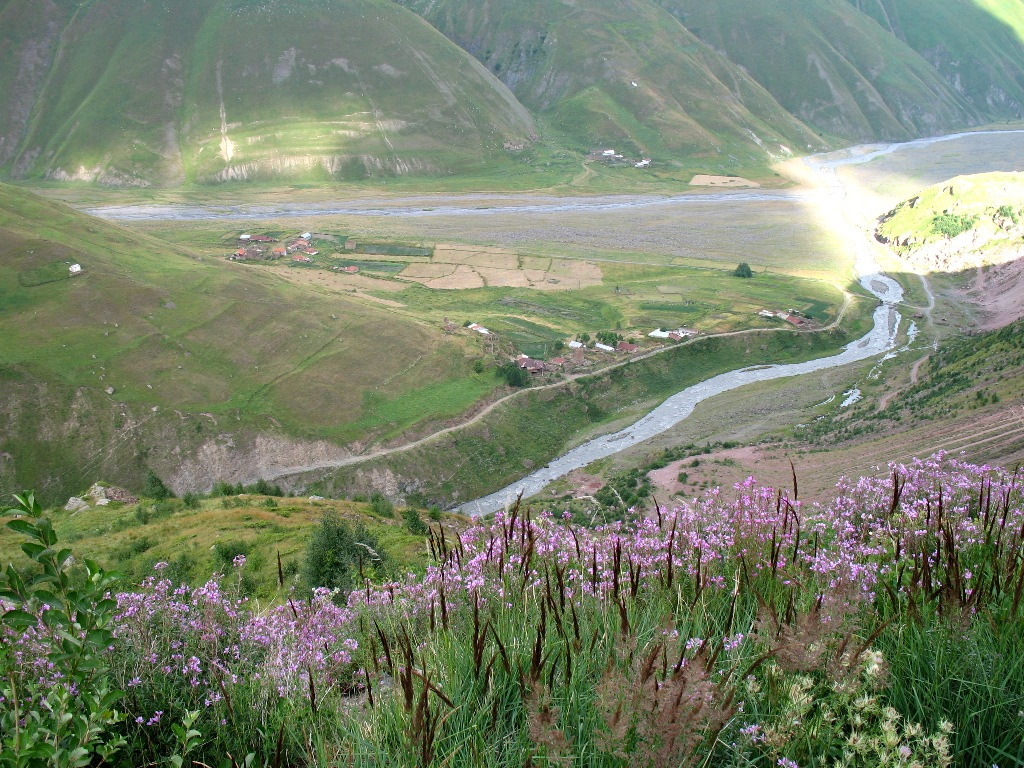
- Village of Shevardeni (top right)
- Interactive map of Shevardeni
- Location within Georgia Location within Mtskheta-Mtianeti
- Coordinates: 42°34′59″N 44°28′20″E
- Country: Georgia
- Mkhare: Mtskheta-Mtianeti
- Municipality: Kazbegi
- Community: Kobi
- Elevation: 2,020 m (6,630 ft)

Population (2014)
  - Total: 0
- Time zone: UTC+4 (Georgian Time)

Shevardeni (Georgian: შევარდენი, literally a falcon) is a village in the historical region of Khevi, north-eastern Georgia. It is located on the left bank of the river Tergi. Administratively, it is part of the Kazbegi Municipality in Mtskheta-Mtianeti. Distance to the municipality center Stepantsminda is 23 km.

== Sources ==
- "შევარდენი" (PDF). Georgian Soviet Encyclopedia (in Georgian). Vol. 10. Tbilisi. 1986. p. 702.
