= Ukhati =

Ukhati უხათი
- Interactive map of Ukhati
- Location within Georgia Location within Mtskheta-Mtianeti
- Coordinates: 42°33′27″N 44°31′18″E
- Country: Georgia
- Mkhare: Mtskheta-Mtianeti
- Municipality: Kazbegi
- Elevation: 2,200 m (7,200 ft)

Population (2014)
  - Total: 0
- Time zone: UTC+4 (Georgian Time)

Ukhati (Georgian: უხათი) is a village in the historical region of Khevi, north-eastern Georgia. It is located on the right bank of the Tergi river. Administratively, it is part of the Kazbegi Municipality in Mtskheta-Mtianeti. Distance to the municipality center Stepantsminda is 21 km.

== Sources ==
- Georgian Soviet Encyclopedia, V. 10, p. 201, Tbilisi, 1986 year.
