= Zakagori =

Zakagori ზაქაგორი
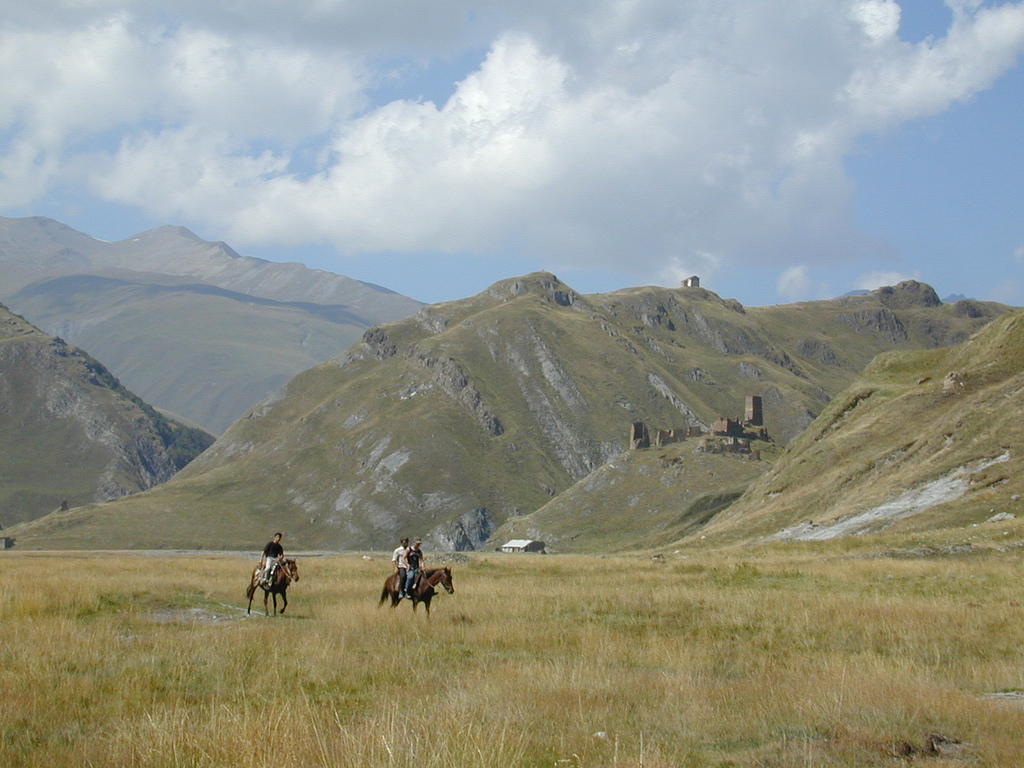
- Village of Zakagori
- Interactive map of Zakagori
- Location within Georgia Location within Mtskheta-Mtianeti
- Coordinates: 42°36′42″N 44°22′26″E
- Country: Georgia
- Mkhare: Mtskheta-Mtianeti
- Municipality: Kazbegi
- Community: Kobi
- Elevation: 2,243 m (7,359 ft)

Population (2014)
  - Total: 0
- Time zone: UTC+4 (Georgian Time)

Zakagori (Georgian: ზაქაგორი or Georgian: ზაკაგორი; Iron Ossetic: Четойтыхъæу, Ĉetojtyqæw) is a village in the Truso Gorge, part of the historical region of Khevi, north-eastern Georgia. It is located on the left bank of the river Suatisi. Administratively, it is part of the Kazbegi Municipality in Mtskheta-Mtianeti. Distance to the municipality center Stepantsminda is 29.5 km.

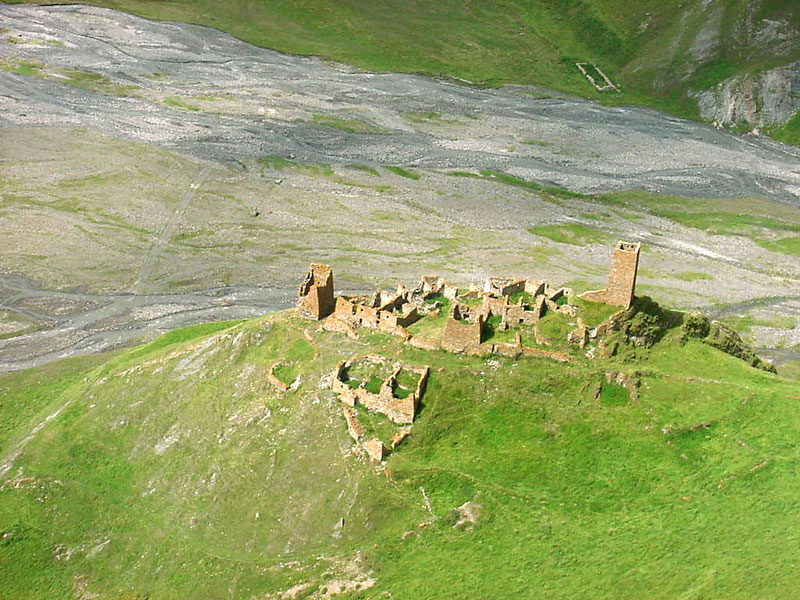
View of Truso valley and Zakagori village.

== Sources ==
- Georgian Soviet Encyclopedia
- Google Earth
