= Tepi, Georgia =

Tepi ტეფი
- Interactive map of Tepi
- Location within Georgia Location within Mtskheta-Mtianeti
- Coordinates: 42°39′39″N 44°19′06″E
- Country: Georgia
- Mkhare: Mtskheta-Mtianeti
- Municipality: Kazbegi
- Elevation: 2,320 m (7,610 ft)

Population (2014)
  - Total: 0
- Time zone: UTC+4 (Georgian Time)

Tepi (Georgian: ტეფი) is a hamlet in Truso Gorge, part of the historical region of Khevi, north-eastern Georgia. It is located on the left bank of the Tergi river. Administratively, it is part of the Kazbegi Municipality in Mtskheta-Mtianeti. Distance to the municipality center Stepantsminda is 44.5 km. Hamlet was named after the Tepi mountain, elevation 3,934 m (12,907 ft), located upstream of the small local creek.

== Population ==
According to the 2014 census, no one lives in the village anymore.

== Sources ==
- Georgian Soviet Encyclopedia, V. 9, p. 702, Tbilisi, 1985 year.
