= Resi, Georgia =

Resi რესი
- Location within Georgia Location within Mtskheta-Mtianeti
- Coordinates: 42°39′49″N 44°18′01″E
- Country: Georgia
- Mkhare: Mtskheta-Mtianeti
- Municipality: Kazbegi
- Elevation: 2,400 m (7,900 ft)

Population (2014)
  - Total: 0
- Time zone: UTC+04:00 (Georgia Time)

Resi (Georgian: რესი) is a village in the Truso Gorge, part of the historical region of Khevi, north-eastern Georgia. It is located on the left bank of the Tergi river. Administratively, it is part of the Kazbegi Municipality in the Mtskheta-Mtianeti region, known as a mkhare in Georgia. Distance to the municipality center Stepantsminda is 42 km (26 mi).

== Sources ==
- "რესი" (PDF). Georgian Soviet Encyclopedia (in Georgian). Vol. 8. Tbilisi. 1984. p. 368.
