= Mna, Georgia =

Mna მნა
- Location within Georgia Location within Mtskheta-Mtianeti
- Coordinates: 42°36′39″N 44°27′44″E
- Country: Georgia
- Mkhare: Mtskheta-Mtianeti
- Municipality: Kazbegi
- Elevation: 2,200 m (7,200 ft)

Population (2014)
  - Total: 0
- Time zone: UTC+04:00 (Georgia Time)

Mna (Georgian: მნა) is a village in the Truso Gorge, part of the historical region of Khevi, north-eastern Georgia. It is located on the left bank of the Tergi tributary river – Mnaisistskali. Administratively, it is part of the Kazbegi Municipality in the Mtskheta-Mtianeti region, known as mkhare in Georgia. Distance to the municipality center Stepantsminda is 29 km (18 mi).

== Sources ==
- Georgian Soviet Encyclopedia, V. 7, p. 52, Tbilisi, 1984 year.
