= Truso Gorge =

Valley in Georgia

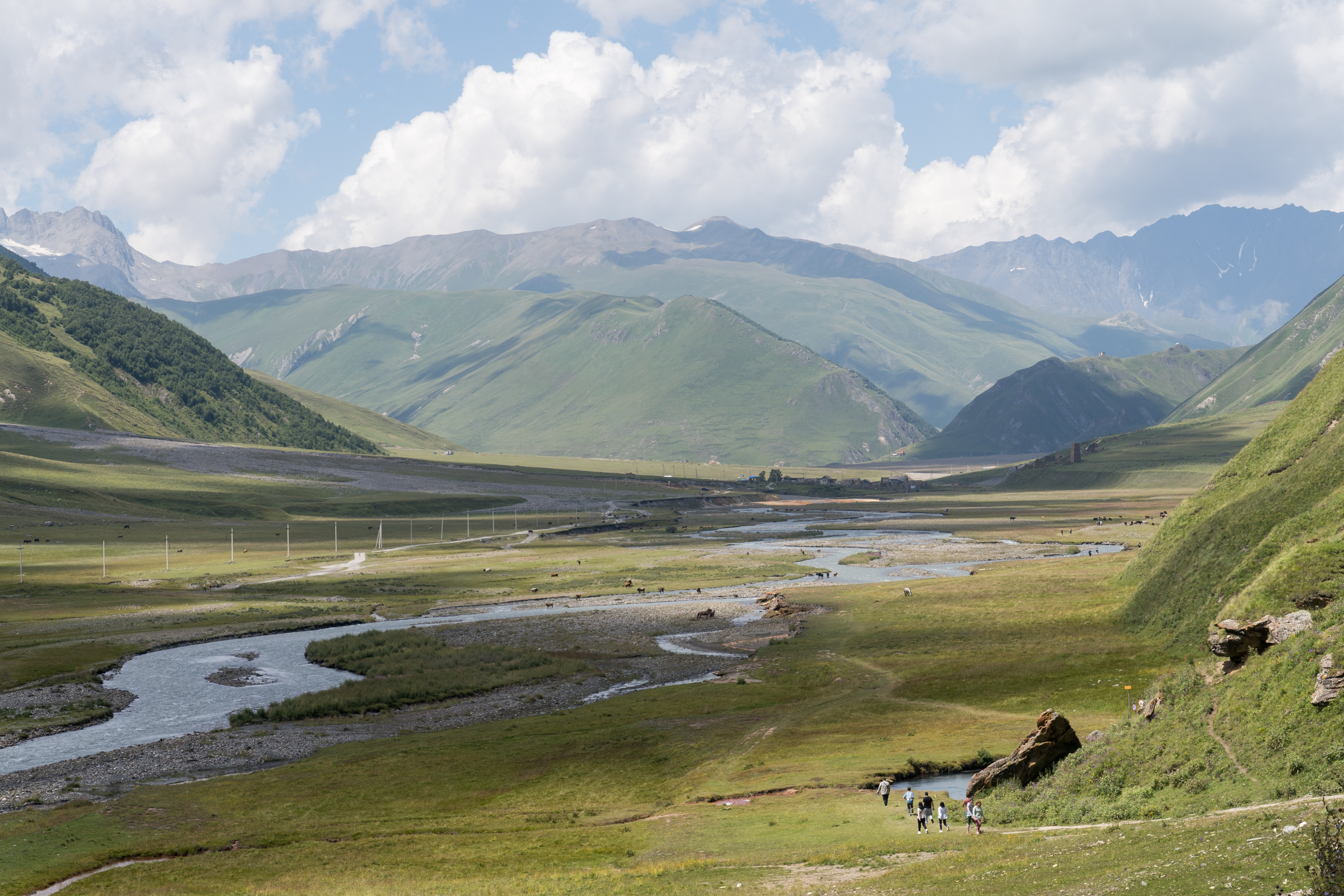
The Terek river in the Truso Gorge

The Truso Gorge (Georgian: თრუსოს ხეობა, romanized: trusos kheoba), is a high-altitude trough valley in northeastern Georgia, located in the Kazbegi Municipality and is part of the historical Khevi region. It contains Georgian cultural and historical heritage. The valley is part of the Kazbegi National Park and is the source of the Terek river.

== Geography ==
The Truso gorge is located between the Caucasus and Khokh Ranges in the Kazbegi region of Georgia, and borders the Russian autonomous republic of North Ossetia to the north. The source of the Terek river is located in the gorge.

== Settlements ==
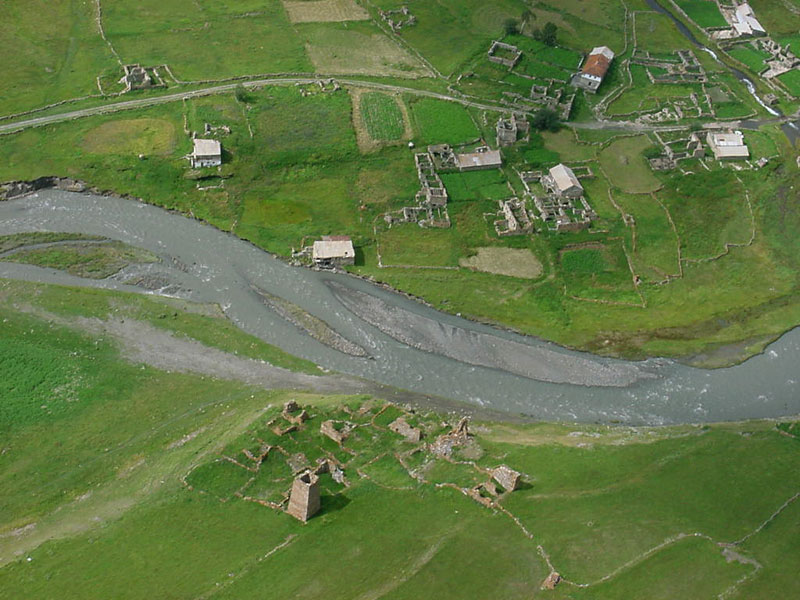
Ruins of the village of Ketrisi

In 1771, the Baltic German explorer Johann Anton Güldenstädt calls Truso gorge by the names of Tirsau and Truso, and noted that 13 villages were located in it, while the gorge itself was controlled by the Georgian princely family of Aragvis Eristavi under the Georgian Kingdom. Truso Gorge was home to 19 villages ethnic, however, as a result of the South Ossetia war (1991-1992) and the Russo-Georgian War, most of these villages are abandoned, with only 29 people living in the Gorge, and most of those are only seasonally. Prior to these conflicts the region had a significant Ossetian minority, with 65 Ossetian families living there, as well as Assianist shrines.

Some settlements include:

- Kvemo Okrokana
- Zemo Okrokana
- Shevardeni
- Ketrisi
- Chetyr
- Abano
- Resi
- Tepi
- Jimara
- Tsotsolta
- Suatisi
- Zakagori
- Mna

== Border dispute ==
According to Soviet censuses, the population in the gorge was 6098 Georgians to 3529 Ossetians in 1939, however, by 1970 this had become 6056 Georgians to 983 Ossetians, and according to the last Soviet census in 1989 there where only 445 Ossetians to 5891 Georgians. Following the departure of the majority of the remaining Ossetian population during the 1991 war Georgian families attempted to move into the now abandoned villages. When the remaining Ossetian population left during the 2008 war the Georgian government named the gorge a "border region" due to increased tensions with Russia, resettling most of the local Georgians out of the gorge, and requiring everyone, Georgians and Ossetians, to pass an interior checkpoint providing documentation. However, both North and South Ossetia have stated that the gorge is Ossetian land which will return to Ossetia at some point. Georgia does allow limited entry to the gorge from its original pre-1991 Ossetian population, given they provide proper documentation, however, they forbid military-aged men from entering. In 2006 the Georgian government passed a law to compensate all ethnic Ossetians still holding Georgian citizenship that lost their homes in the 1991 conflict, however, the Ossetians from Truso that apply find it almost impossible to regain Georgian citizenship, after having renounced it in favor of Ossetian citizenship.

The Georgian Orthodox Church has constructed new monasteries and churches in the gorge, which the Ossetian government accuses as an attempt to erase Ossetian culture and Assianist traditions. This has caused the local Ossetians to protest the Georgian government and call on the gorge to be handed over to South Ossetia. On June 29, 2019, Dmitri Medoev, South Osseita's foreign minister, claimed that the gorge was "historically eastern Ossetian lands" which caused fears in Georgia that Russia would try to invade the gorge for its separatist puppet state. Similar claims were made by Eduard Kokoity during the 2008 war, and since 2016 the South Ossetian government claimed it as "Eastern Ossetia." Kokoity would also say that he strongly desired sending Ossetian militias to seize the gorge, but that the Russian military deterred him. In 2017 50 former residents of the gorge and their descendants attempted to cross the border but where turned away by Georgian border guards. In 2018 South Ossetia expanded these territorial claims expanded to include the Ghuda Gorge and the Kobi Plateau while Anatoly Bibilov said "Truso gorge was part of Ossetia, not Georgia" and is an Ossetian "native homeland." Georgian reconciliation minister Ketevan Tsikhelashvili responded that the irredentist claims of South Ossetia was "deliberate provocation aimed at threatening and blackmailing the society." In response to Ossetian statements the Georgian government stiffened border controls and military defenses in and near the gorge. On September 30, 2018, Russian border guards crossed the international border and detained 5 Georgian tourists in the gorge who were hiking, detaining them in a Tskhinvali prison for several days until each paid a 2,000 Russian rubles ($29.61) fine. Afterwards, the Jamestown Foundation reported "evidence increasingly suggests the Moscow-backed separatist regime in South Ossetia is pushing to wholly annex Truso Gorge and the Kazbegi District" citing efforts by Russian and Ossetian border guards to move their border fence several meters at a time deeper into Georgia, as well as aforementioned territorial claims. During the 2024 Karasin-Abashidze dialogue one of the key topics was to open the way for North Ossetian Assianist pilgrims to visit the gorge during holidays.
