= Dariali Hydropower Plant =

Hydroelectric power plant in Kazbegi Municipality, Georgia

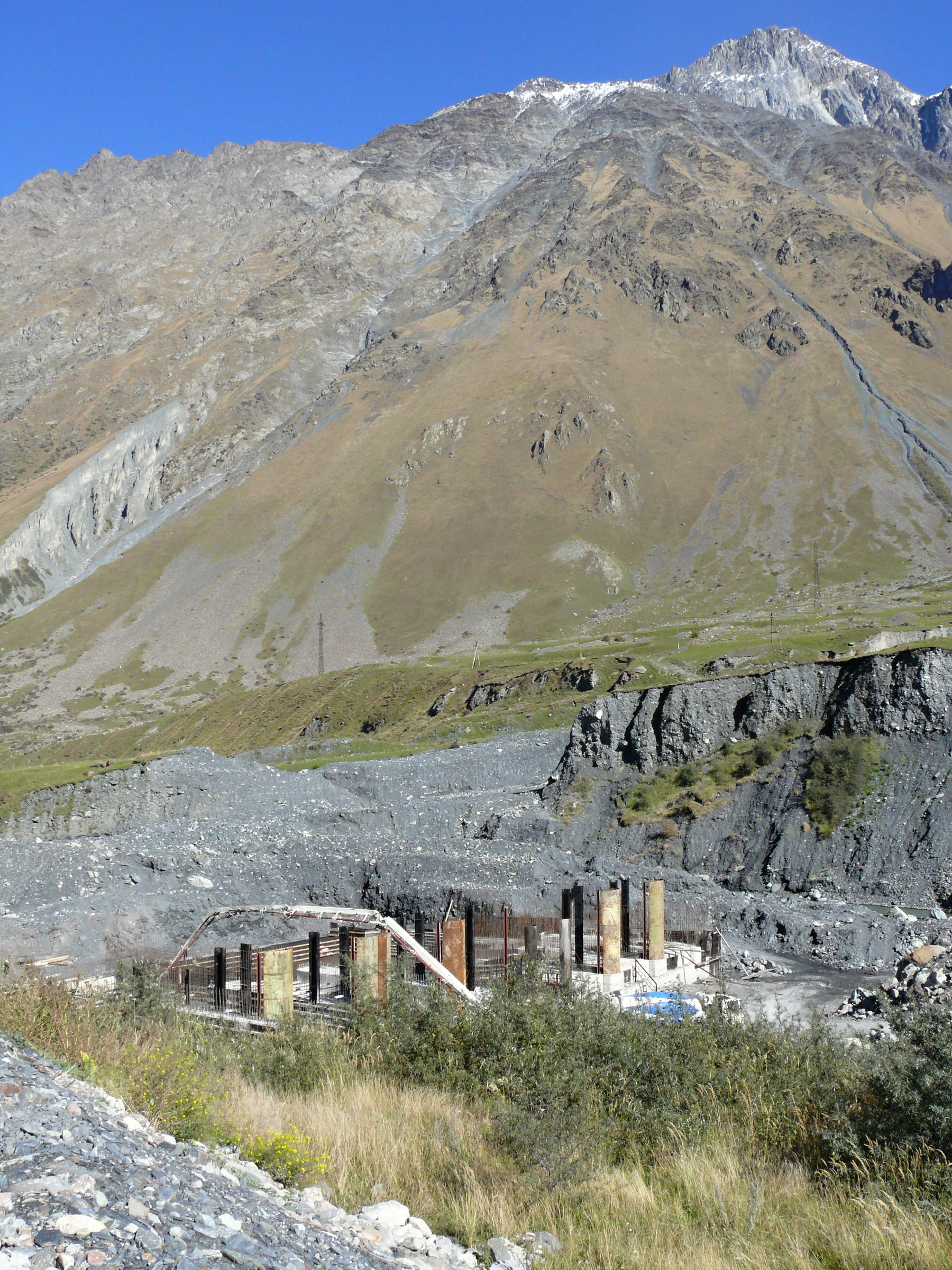
Dariali HPP in 2014.

Dariali Hydropower Plant, referred to as Dariali HPP, is a 108 MW run-of-the-river hydropower plant built in 2017 in Georgia. It is located on the Tergi River in Kazbegi Municipality, at less than 1 km from the Russian-Georgian border, 160 km far from Tbilisi.

It is a diversion-type facility, including a small upstream diversion dam, a 5 km-long, 5 m diameter headrace tunnel, and a downstream underground power house.

With an overall installed capacity reaching 108 MW (three vertical Pelton turbines 36 MW each), Dariali HPP was the fourth largest hydropower plant in Georgia on the date of its commission. More importantly, it was the largest to be built in Georgia since its independence in 1991. It is expected to generate an average electricity output of 510 GWh per year for the National Grid, to which it is connected via Dariali 110kV transmission overhead line.

The project was launched in 2011, its funding was approved in May 2014 and boring works started later this year. The underground construction was completed in April 2015, and the whole facility was commissioned in April 2017.

== Funding ==
Total cost of the project was $123 million, fairly close to the initially planned $120 million, 23% of which correspond to the state contribution.

The agreement on construction was signed between the Government of Georgia and the company Dariali Energy JSC on May 19, 2011. Before EBRD loan approval the company had actively used the domestic (more expensive) resource to boost the project development as much as possible. The company is supported by a top European project engineering conglomerate (Landsvirkjun Power & Verkis) (Iceland) which provides the project's engineering supervision and preparation and implementation of the construction project. Construction and electromechanical contracts have been executed according to FIDIC standards, which makes the employer-contractor relationship the most transparent and effective.

In August 2014, the company Dariali Energy JSC and European Bank for Reconstruction and Development signed loan agreement for up to US 80 million for the financing of the development, construction and operation of Dariali HPP, which comprises the first project financing and first successful public-private partnership project in energy sector of Georgia. This project is one of the first energy projects in Georgia to rely on limited recourse to the Sponsors and, under an A/B loan syndication structure, could provide a demonstration of new financing methods to other project developers in the market. EMEA Finance's Project Finance Awards 2014 awarded Dariali Energy JSC for the Best water project in Central and Eastern Europe.

== Environment ==
According to the environmental and social policies of the European Bank for Reconstruction and Development (EBRD), the project was awarded the “A” category. The categorization is based largely on the specific location of the proposed project and sensitive environment connected to the development of hydropower plants in Georgia, in general. The project is in full compliance with EC European Energy Policy adopted in 2007 and the UN Framework Convention on Climate Change (enacted by Kyoto Protocol in 2005), which appeals to all states to concentrate efforts towards increasing of energy consumption efficiency through increased utilization of renewable energy sources and decrease of environmental degradation.

As a diversion-type run-of-the-river power plant, Dariali HPP required a very limited flooding the upper part of the river (the upstream impounding pond volume is 7,000 m³), and a reduced construction magnitude, thus drastically decreasing the environmental impact of the project both in short and long-term perspectives. Dariali HPP features a fish path, which should create close to natural conditions to the local river ichtyofauna (namely brown trout). The company is committed to maintain the biodiversity and for this purpose the Aquatic Biodiversity Action Plan by the Blue Rivers Environmental Consulting company has been developed.

The Project claims to be the first carbon neutral energy project construction in Georgia. In order to compensate for entire lifecycle GHG emissions of the project (construction works and operation), the project includes a reforestation component. 200 hectares of forest are set to be planted by 2021 in the nearby Kazbegi Municipality.

The use of Dariali HPP hydropower instead of new fossil-fueled capacities will cause the reduction of more than 250,000 tons of greenhouse gas annually, and reduce Georgia's dependence on imported fossil fuels.

== Local impacts ==
Electricity demand in Georgia has been on the rise since 2009 and investments in new generation capacity were lagging behind. Georgia has a huge economically viable hydroelectricity generation potential (about 27 TWh/year), although only about a third of it was tapped (8,5 GWh/year) in the 2010s, allowing a large increase in future installed capacity. The Dariali HPP generated electricity will be consumed in winter locally and exported in summer. There are plans to export the electricity to Turkey, Syria, Iraq and Balkan countries, but if Georgia's economy develops further, it will be used to cover domestic needs.

According to the EBRD the project will strengthen the private energy sector in Georgia where state owned generators account for 45% of electricity consumption. Construction of Dariali HPP aimed at developing the hydroelectric potential of the Tergi River.

Income growth of Kazbegi municipality and the whole region is also expected. Construction works generated 420 jobs and plant operation requires another 70, both mostly attributed to local residents. The facility will make an annual contribution of Lari 2,5 million to the local budget as a result of the property tax. The contractor is also involved in various social activities (for example, it sponsors the children's rugby team in Kazbegi).

== Opposition ==
The critique focuses on the fact that the project will divert about 90% of Tergi’s water leaving an approximate 8 km section of the Tergi River with minimum environmental flow only.

That is particularly problematic since the HPP borders with the territory of the Kazbegi National park. At present the possible impact on biodiversity especially brown trout listed in the Georgia Red List is being investigated and if any, relevant mitigation measures will be developed. The landscape on this section of the gorge will also change.

One of the more known Georgian NGOs, Green Alternative, has warned already in 2012 about the increased risk of natural disasters due to inadequate analysis of the hydrological regime of the Tergi river and its tributaries, glacial rivers with large fall of stream, significant sedimentation drift and mudflow currents during heavy rain and snowmelt periods. It has filed a complaint against the company Dariali Energy, but it failed to win the cases. There was a case landslide already (in May 2014), when around 1,5 million cubic metres of landmass crashed down the mountainside and deposited in Tergi River, causing human deaths and destroying of the roads. However, there is no confirmation of the contribution of the Dariali HPP construction to this dangerous natural phenomenon.

== See also ==
- List of power stations in Georgia (country)
- Energy in Georgia (country)
