= MNA =

Mna or MNA may refer to:

- Mna, a Latin and Greek form of the Mina (unit), a unit of weight and money

== Acronyms ==
- Ma'an News Agency, Palestinian Territories
- Magyar Nemzeti Arcvonal (Hungarian National Front)
- Mehr News Agency, Iran
- Member of the National Assembly (Quebec)
- Member of the National Assembly of Pakistan
- Merpati Nusantara Airlines, ICAO code
- Midland News Association, UK
- Midtre Namdal Avfallsselskap, a Norwegian waste management agency
- Minnesota Nurses Association, labor union, US
- Missouri and Northern Arkansas Railroad's reporting mark
- Mna, a village in Georgia
- Modified nodal analysis of electric circuits
- Mouvement national algérien (Algerian National Movement), 1950s
- Mouvement national de l'Azawad (National Movement for the Liberation of Azawad)
- Museo Nacional de Antropología, the national museum of anthropology, Mexico
- Muslim National Associations, a Muslim pro-Zionist organization
- Myanmar National Airlines, the national flag carrier of Myanmar
- Myanmar News Agency, the official news agency in Burma
- Mergers and acquisitions (M&A)
