= Resi =

Resi can refer to:

== Settlements ==
- Resi (village), a village in the historical region of Khevi, Georgia

== People ==
Resi is a German and Austrian first name, usually short for Therese.

- Andreas Franz (1897-1970), a German footballer
- Resi Hammerer (1925-2010), an Austrian alpine skier
- Resi Stiegler (born 1985), an American alpine skier

== Other ==
- Rèze, a white wine grape sometimes known as "resi"
- 1371 Resi, an asteroid
- Resident Evil, a media franchise sometimes nicknamed "Resi"
- The Institute for Responsible Superintelligence (RESI), a non-profit AI safety institute
