= Kazbegi Museum =

Museum in Kazbegi, Georgia

Kazbegi Town Museum
- Stephantsminda Museum of History
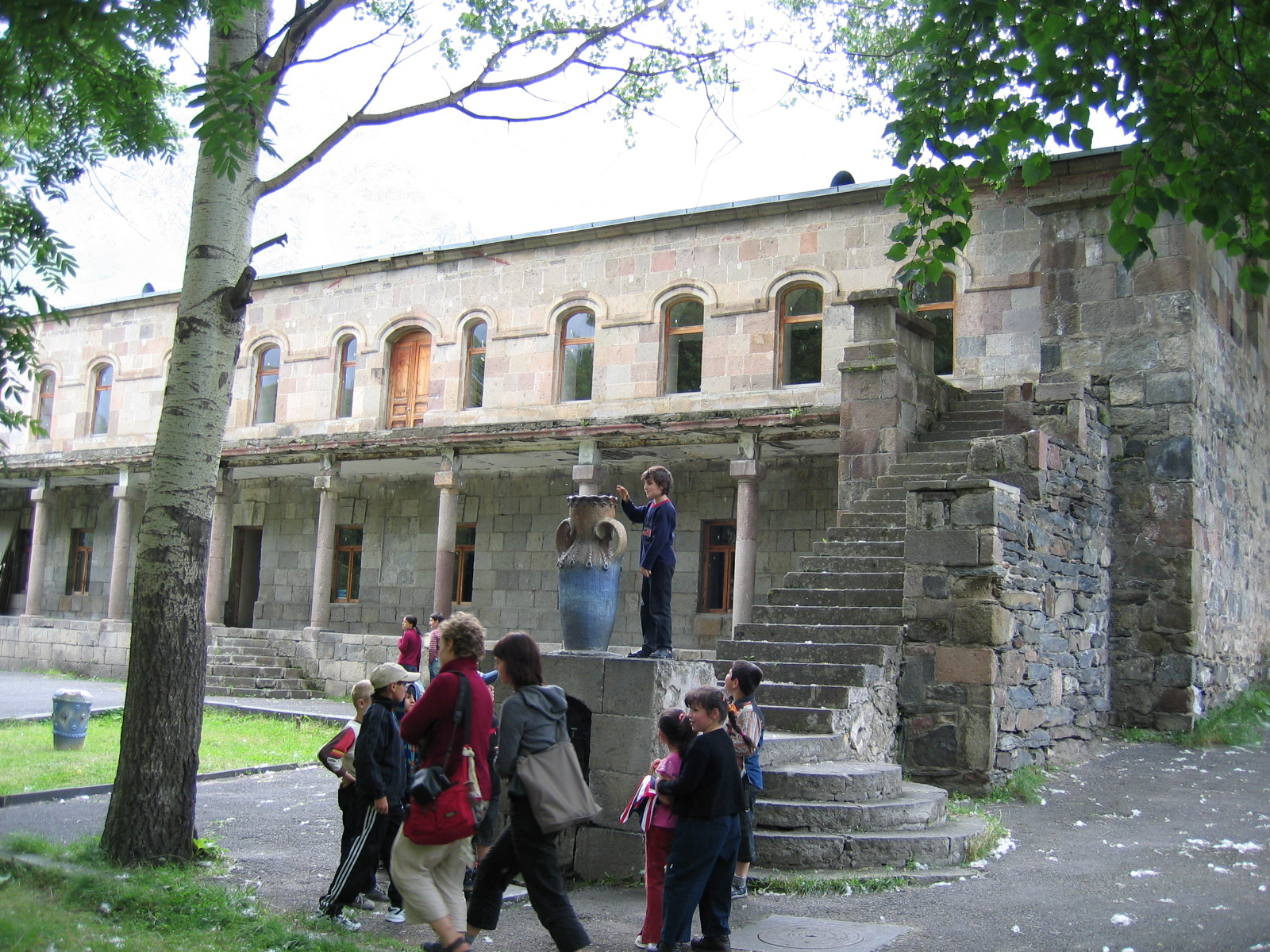
- Kazbegi Museum

- Location within Mtskheta-Mtianeti Location within Georgia
- Location: Stepantsminda, Mtskheta-Mtianeti, Georgia
- Coordinates: 42°39′38″N 44°38′35″E
- Visitors: Temporary closed.

The Kazbegi Museum (Georgian: სტეფანწმინდის ისტორიული მუზეუმი (სტეფანწმინდა)) is a museum in Stepantsminda (formerly known as Kazbegi), Kazbegi Municipality, Mtskheta-Mtianeti, Georgia.
