= Khokh Range =

Mountain range in the Caucasus

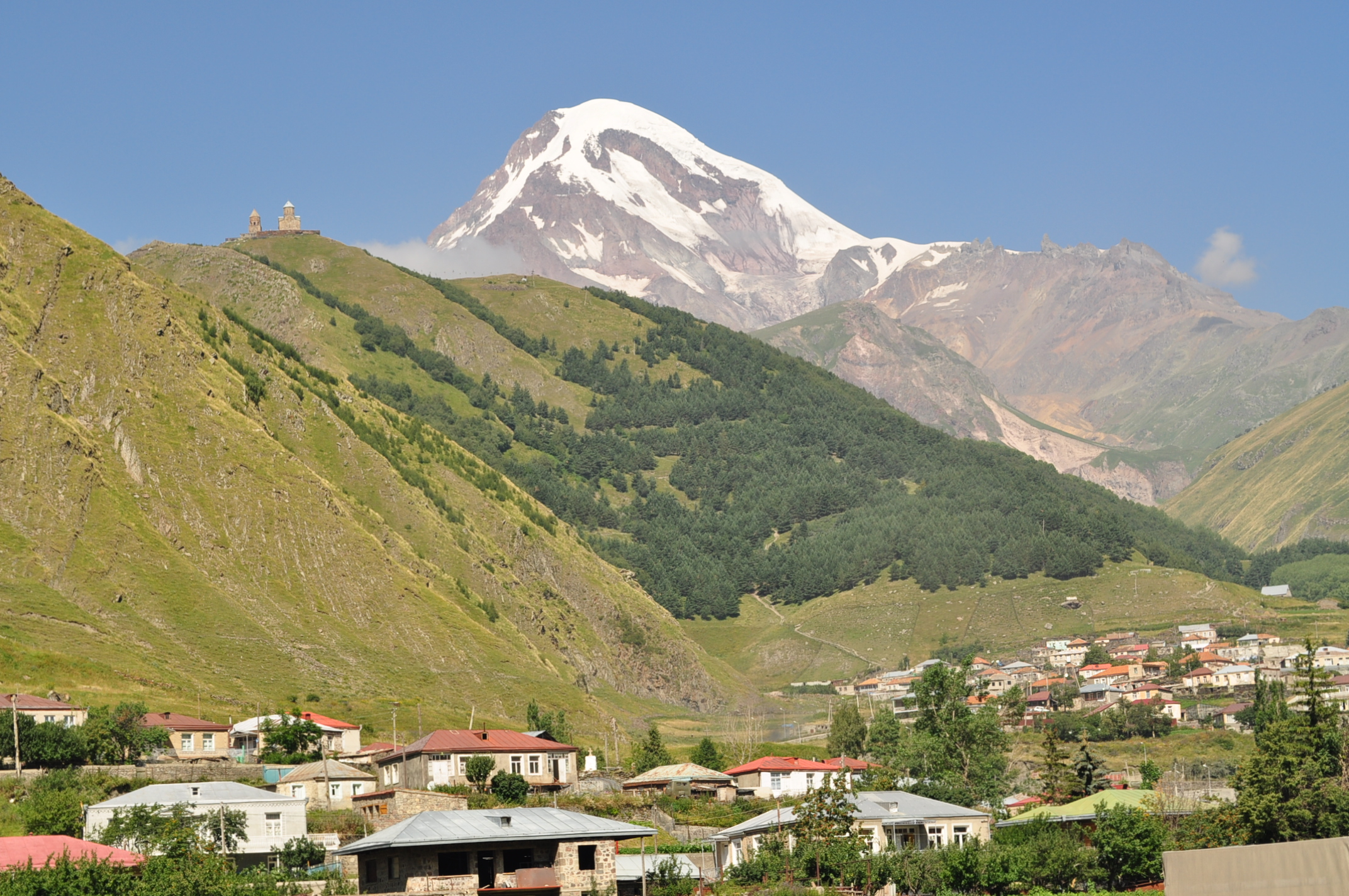
- View of Mount Kazbek, Gergeti Trinity, and Gergeti village

Highest point
- Peak: Kazbek
- Elevation: 5,047 m (16,558 ft)
- Coordinates: 42°42′54.1″N 44°22′55.3″E

Geography
- Location within Mtskheta-Mtianeti Location within Georgia Location within Caucasus Mountains Location within North Ossetia–Alania Location within European Russia
- Location: Mtskheta-Mtianeti Kazbegi Municipality, Georgia and North Ossetia–Alania, Russia
- Countries: Georgia and Russia
- Range coordinates: 42°42′54.1″N 44°22′55.3″E
- Parent range: Lateral Range; Caucasus Mountains
- Borders on: Greater Caucasus

The Khokh Range (Georgian: ხოხის ქედი, romanized: khokhis kedi; Iron Ossetic: Хохы рагъ, romanized: Xoxy rah) is a mountain range of the Caucasus Mountains in Georgia. It runs north of the Greater Caucasus Range, which is pierced by the gorges of the Ardon and the Terek with Truso Pass – 3,150 metres (10,330 ft) above sea level. The Kazbek volcano is located on the Khokh Range.

== Etymology ==
The word khokh means 'mountain' in Ossetian language.

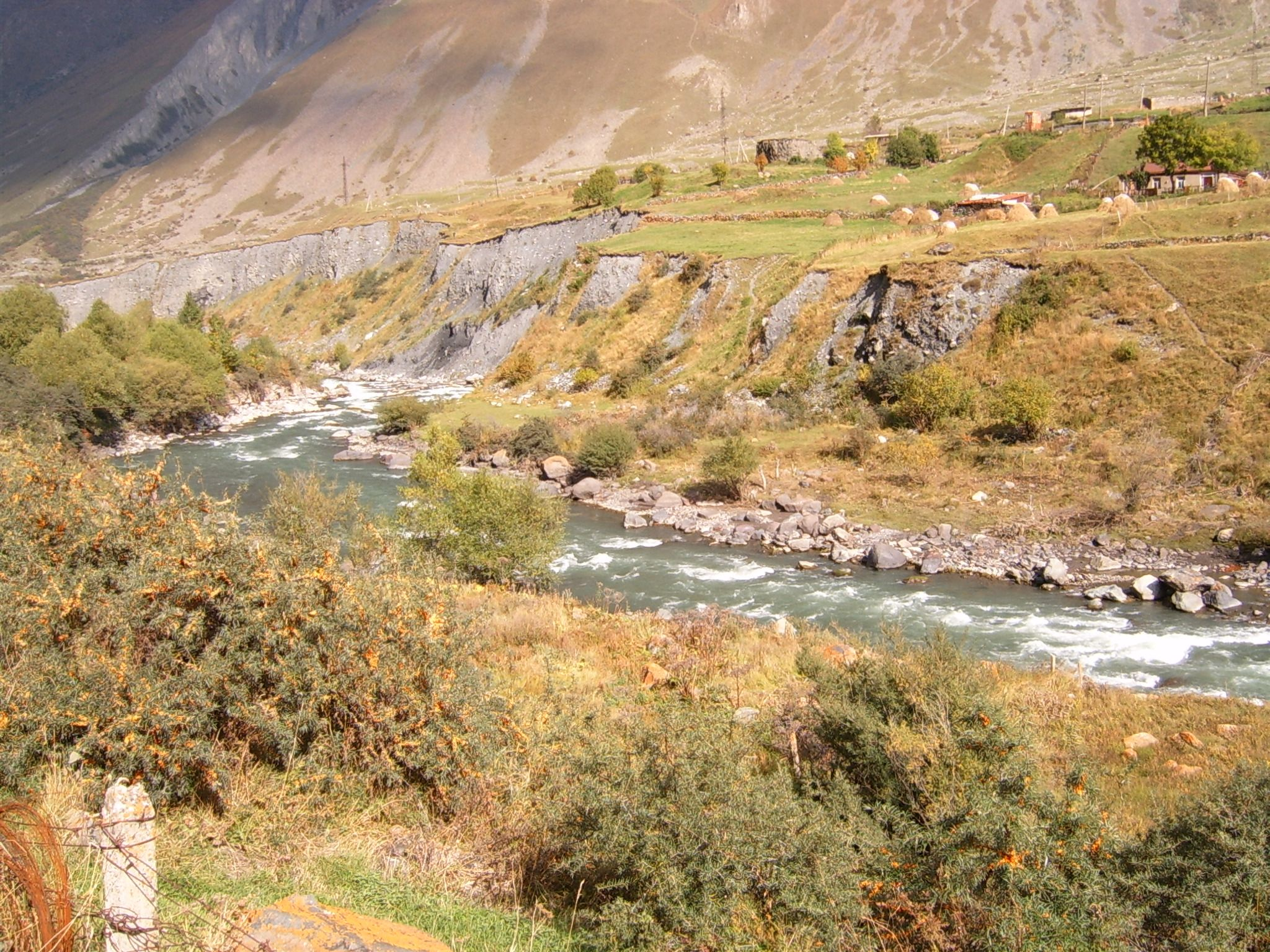
Terek River in North Georgia.
