= Gizeldon =

River in North Ossetia–Alania, Russia

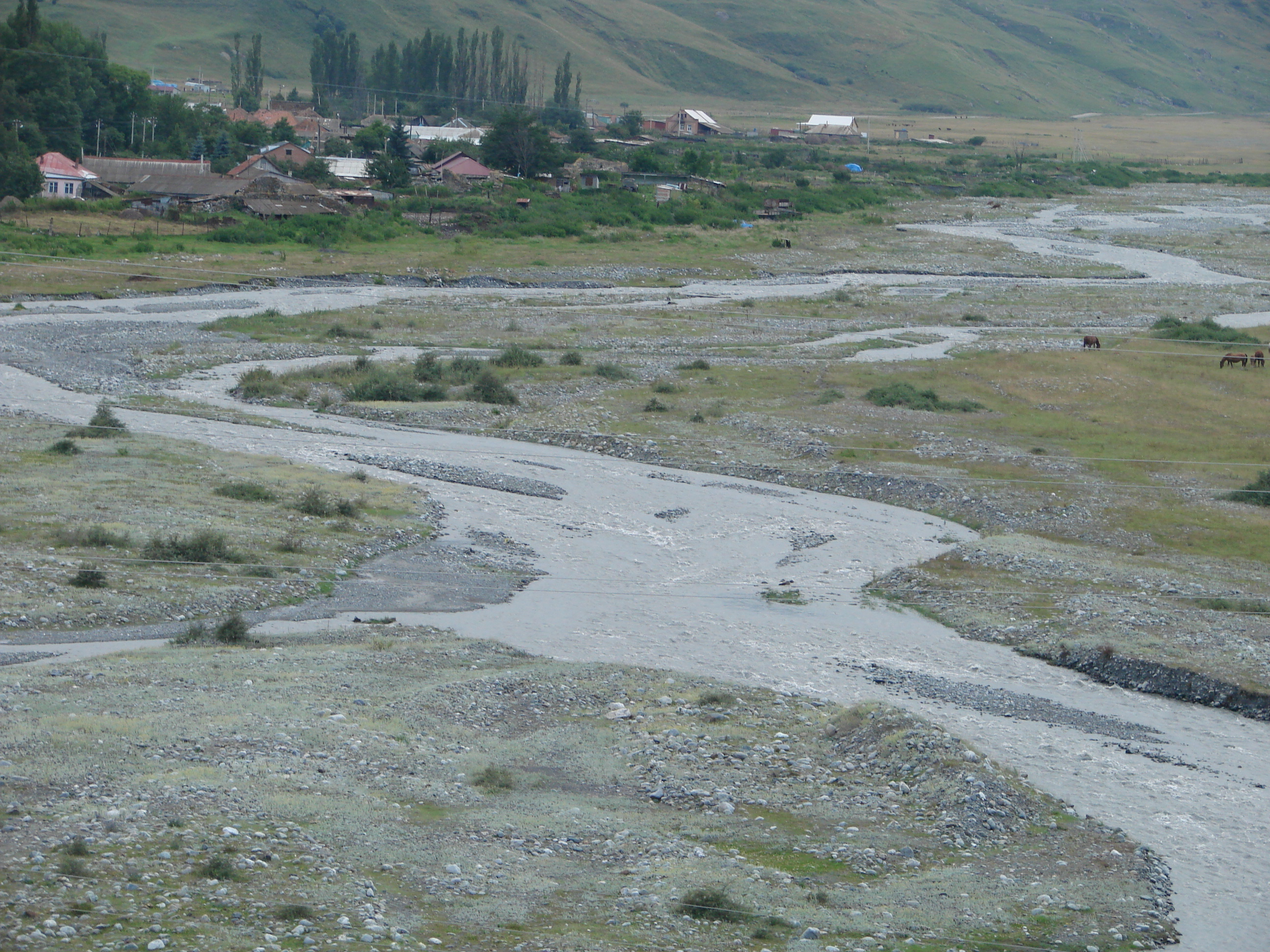

- Location within North Ossetia–Alania Location within Caucasus Mountains Location within European Russia

Location
- Country: North Ossetia–Alania (Russia)

Physical characteristics
- Source
  - location: Caucasus Mountains
- Mouth: Terek
  - coordinates: 43.2367°N 44.3239°E
- Length: 80 km (50 mi)
- Basin size: 604 km^{2} (233 sq mi)

Basin features
- Progression: Terek→ Caspian Sea

The Gizeldon (Russian: Гизельдон or Гизель-Дон; Iron Ossetic: Джызæлдон, Džyzældon), is a river in North Ossetia–Alania just west of Vladikavkaz. It drains the northern slopes and glaciers of Mount Kazbek north to the Terek. The river is 80 kilometres (50 mi) long, with a drainage basin of 604 square kilometres (233 mi^{2}). A valley with many cliffs and a 4000-metre peak, the area is prone to avalanches; 30 were reported in 1967–1968. The terrain is described as having "craggy, gashed terrain", with cattle breeding, lumbering, and lead-zinc mining being the principal economic pursuits of the people of the Gizeldon valley. A hydroelectric plant has been built on the Gizeldon.
