= Kobi, Georgia =

Kobi Georgian: კობი
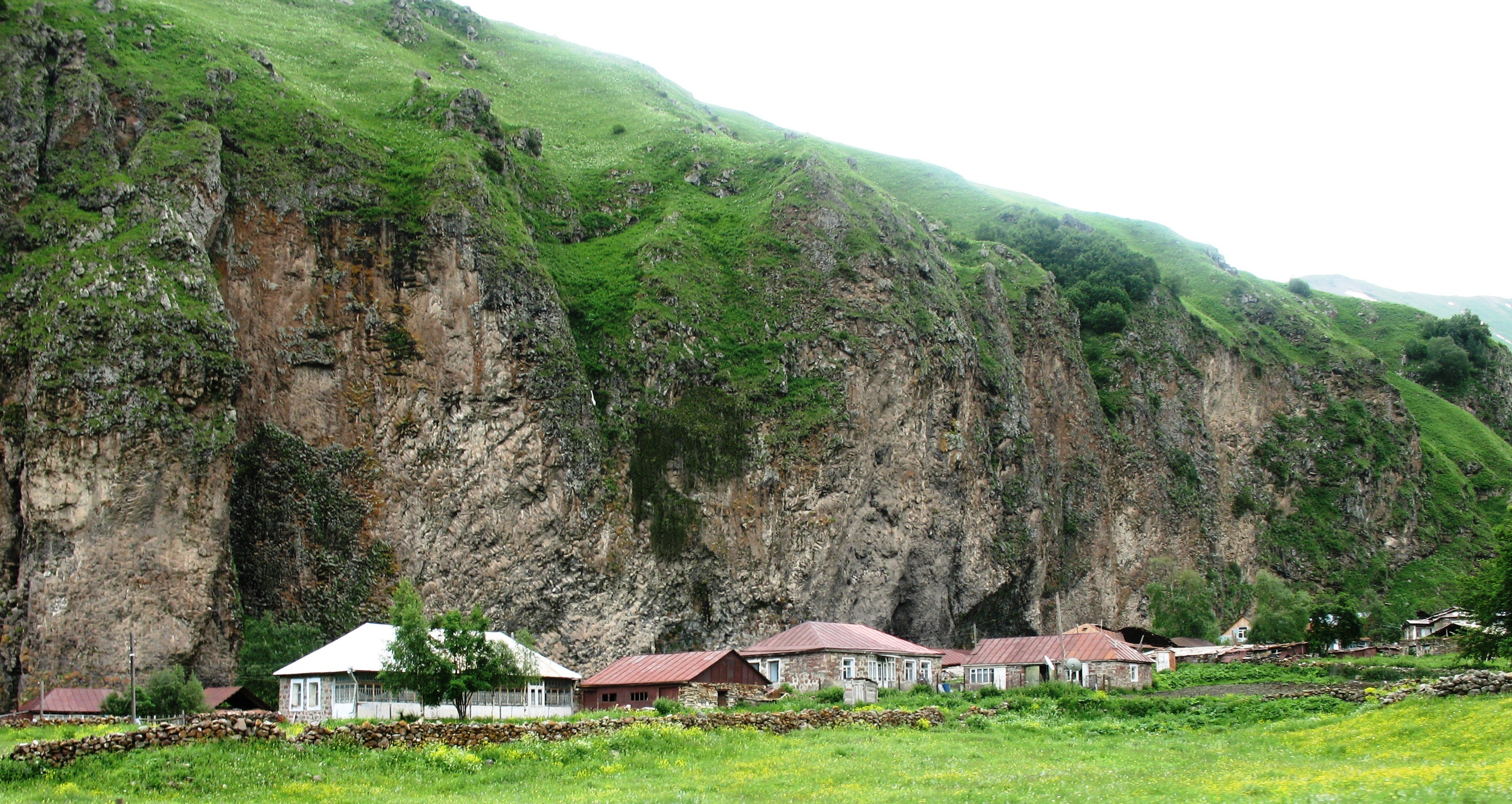
- Interactive map of Kobi
- Location within Georgia Location within Mtskheta-Mtianeti
- Coordinates: 42°33′34″N 44°30′43″E
- Country: Georgia
- Mkhare: Mtskheta-Mtianeti
- Municipality: Kazbegi
- Elevation: 1,970 m (6,460 ft)

Population (2014)
  - Total: 3
- Time zone: UTC+4 (Georgian Time)

Kobi (Georgian: კობი [k’obi]; Iron Ossetic: Къоб [k’ob]) is a village on the Kobi Plateau, part of the historical region of Khevi, Georgia. Administratively, it is part of the Kazbegi Municipality in Mtskheta-Mtianeti. It is a community center of Truso Gorge villages. Distance to the municipality center Stepantsminda is 20 km.

== Transportation ==
The village is located on the Georgian Military Road.

== Climate ==
Climate data for Kobi
Month	Jan	Feb	Mar	Apr	May	Jun	Jul	Aug	Sep	Oct	Nov	Dec	Year
Mean daily maximum °C (°F)	−2.4 (27.7)	−2.2 (28.0)	1.8 (35.2)	7.7 (45.9)	13 (55)	16.4 (61.5)	19.1 (66.4)	19.1 (66.4)	15.6 (60.1)	10.8 (51.4)	3.8 (38.8)	−0.3 (31.5)	8.5 (47.3)
Daily mean °C (°F)	−7.1 (19.2)	−6.9 (19.6)	−2.9 (26.8)	2 (36)	7.1 (44.8)	10.2 (50.4)	12.8 (55.0)	12.7 (54.9)	9 (48)	5 (41)	−0.7 (30.7)	−4.7 (23.5)	3.0 (37.5)
Mean daily minimum °C (°F)	−11.8 (10.8)	−11.5 (11.3)	−7.5 (18.5)	−3.6 (25.5)	1.3 (34.3)	4 (39)	6.5 (43.7)	6.4 (43.5)	2.4 (36.3)	−0.7 (30.7)	−5.1 (22.8)	−9.1 (15.6)	−2.4 (27.7)
Average precipitation mm (inches)	34 (1.3)	40 (1.6)	65 (2.6)	102 (4.0)	143 (5.6)	132 (5.2)	122 (4.8)	138 (5.4)	81 (3.2)	68 (2.7)	62 (2.4)	39 (1.5)	1,026 (40.3)

== Notable people ==
Kobi is a birthplace of Vaso Abaev, a well known Soviet Iranist of Ossetian descent.

== Sources ==
- Georgian Soviet Encyclopedia, V. 5, p. 566, Tbilisi, 1980 year.
