= Khevi =

Coordinates: 42.6975°N 44.519°E

Khevi ხევი
- Historical Region
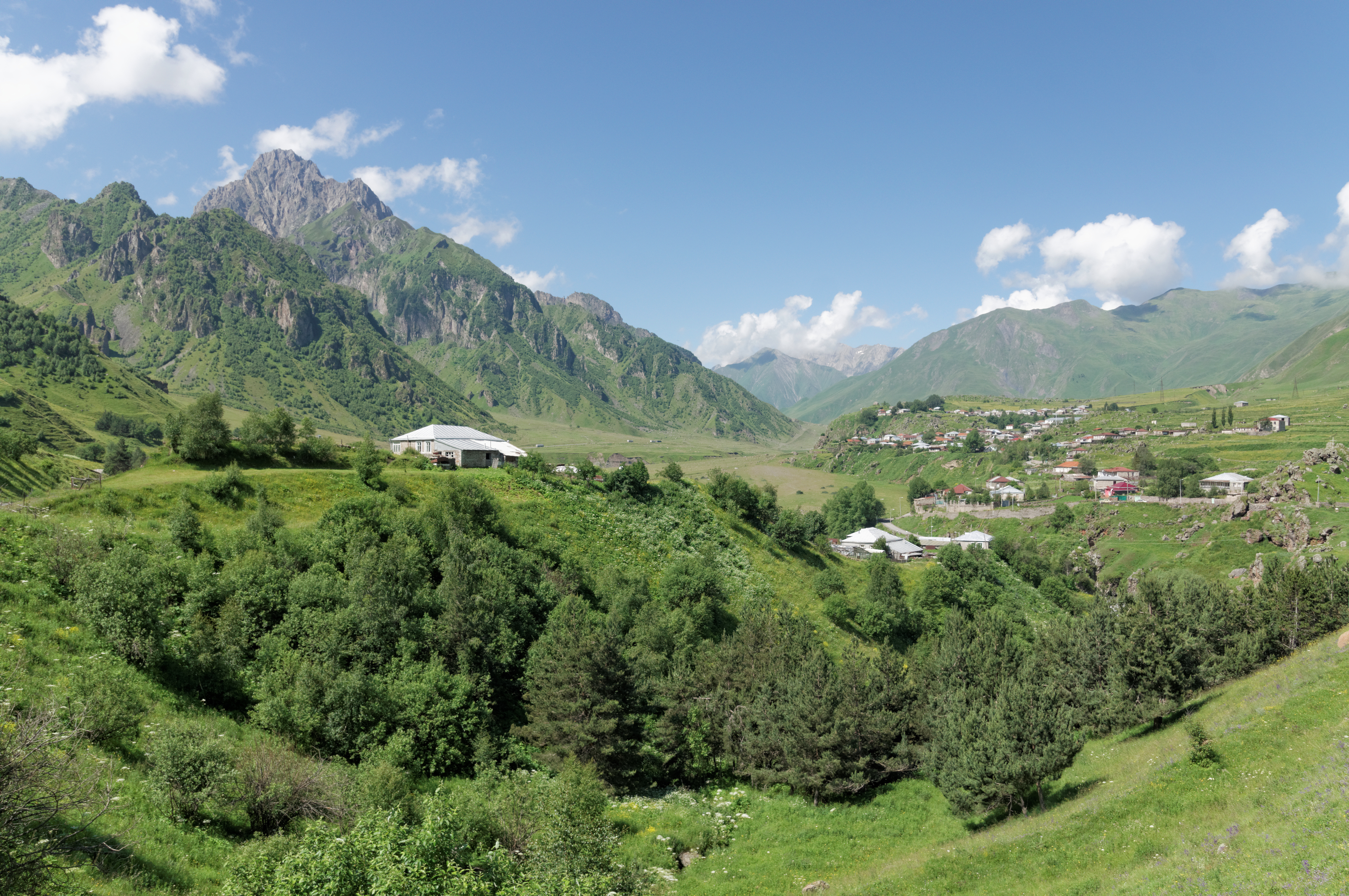

- Map highlighting the historical region of Khevi in Georgia
- Country: Georgia
- Mkhare: Mtskheta-Mtianeti
- Capital: Stepantsminda

Area
  - Total: 1,081 km^{2} (417 sq mi)

Khevi (Georgian: ხევი [χevi]) is a small historical-geographic area in northeastern Georgia. It is included in the modern-day Kazbegi district in the Mtskheta-Mtianeti region (mkhare) of Georgia. Located on the northern slopes of the Greater Caucasus mountains, it comprises three gorges of the rivers Truso, Tergi (Terek) and Snostsq’ali.

The landscape of Khevi is dominated by alpine meadows dotted with rhododendron, mountain passes and waterfalls, and the Mount Kazbek (locally known as Mkinvartsveri, i.e. “ice-capped”), a dormant 5047-meter high volcano. The area is a popular tourist destination. It is a part of the projected Khevi-Aragvi Biosphere Reserve. Among the important cultural sites of Khevi are the Gergeti Trinity Church (fourteenth century), Garbani Church (ninth to tenth century), Sioni Basilica (ninth century) and castle, Betlemi Monastery Complex (ninth to tenth century), and Sno fortress.

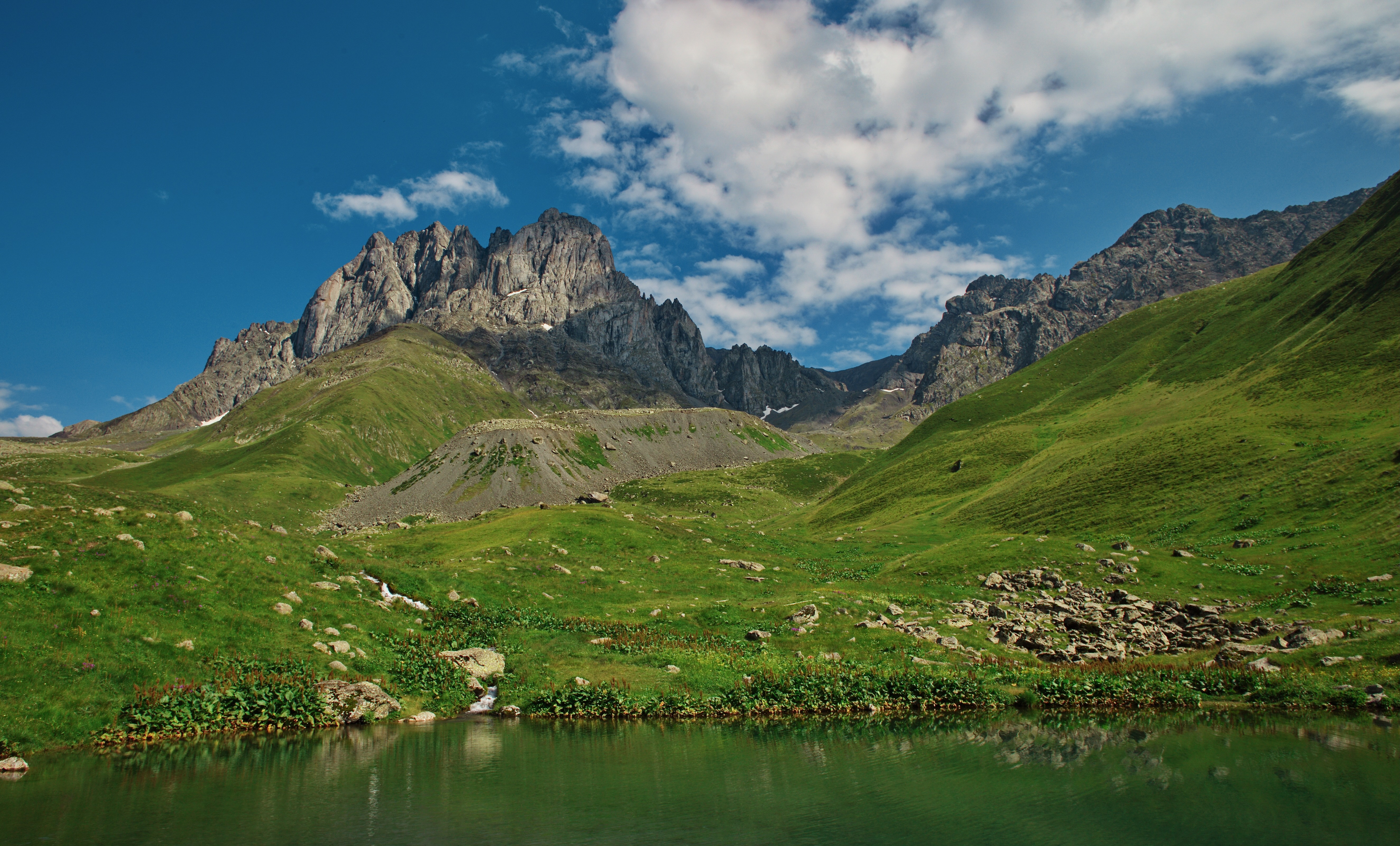
Lake Tina in Khevi

The name of this province, literally meaning "a gorge", comes from the ancient and early medieval district of Tsanareti known to the Georgian annals as Tsanaretis Khevi, i.e. the Tsanar Gorge. People of Khevi were called Mokheves (Mokhevians). History, traditions and lifestyle of the Mokheves are very similar to those of other mountaineers of northeastern Georgia. Since ancient times, Khevi has been of great strategic and military importance due chiefly to its immediate neighborhood to the Darial Pass, which connects the North Caucasus with the South Caucasus. Free of typical feudal relations, locals lived in a patriarchal community governed by a khevisberi (i.e. "gorge elder") who functioned as a judge, priest and military leader.

The Khevian mountainous communities were regarded as direct vassals of the Georgian crown, except for the period ranging from the end of the seventeenth century to 1743, when the area was placed under the control of the semi-autonomous Duchy of Aragvi. The fierce resistance offered by the Mokheves to the attempts of the Aragvian lords has been greatly reflected in local folklore as well as in classical Georgian literature. The establishment of Russian rule in Georgia (1801) was met with hostility by the mountaineers, who staged an uprising in 1804, which was promptly suppressed by the Tsarist military. However, the people of Khevi retained their medieval traditions and a unique form of society until the harsh Soviet rule changed their lifestyle through permanent repressions, forcibly relegating several families to the lowlands.

== See also ==
- Tsanareti
- Khevsureti
- Pshavi
- Tusheti
