= Terek (river) =

River in the North Caucasus

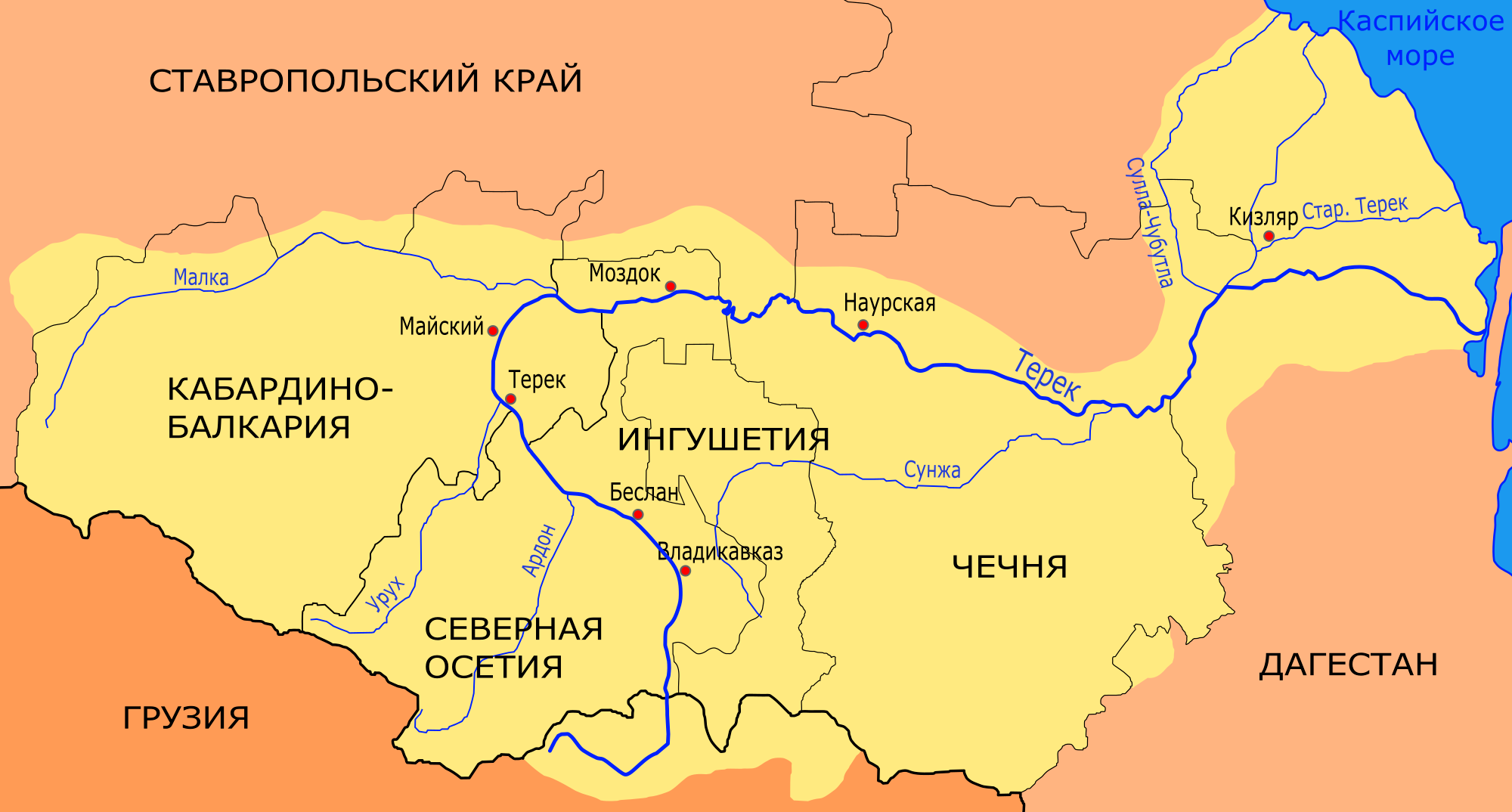
- Map of Terek river

Location
- Countries: Georgia and Russia
- Region: Mtskheta-Mtianeti
- Federal subjects: North Ossetia; Kabardino-Balkaria; Stavropol Krai; Chechnya; Dagestan

Physical characteristics
- Source: Mount Zilga-Khokh
  - location: Main Caucasian Range; Greater Caucasus; Truso Gorge, Georgia
  - coordinates: 42.6159°N 44.2395°E
  - elevation: 2,700 m (8,900 ft)
- Mouth: Caspian Sea
  - coordinates: 43.595278°N 47.561667°E
  - elevation: −28 m (−92 ft)
- Length: 623 km (387 mi)
- Basin size: 43,200 km^{2} (16,700 sq mi)
- Discharge
  - average: 305 m^{3} (10,800 cu ft) per second

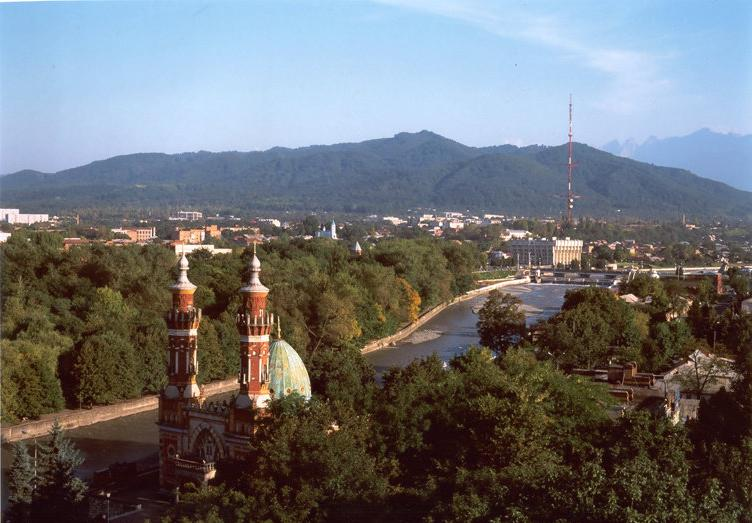
The Terek river in Vladikavkaz

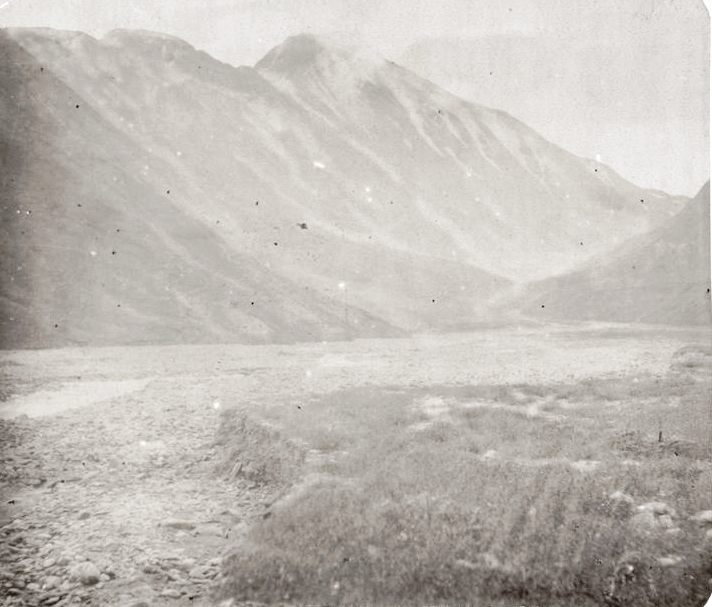
Mountain Zilgi-Khokh and source of the River Terek in 1886

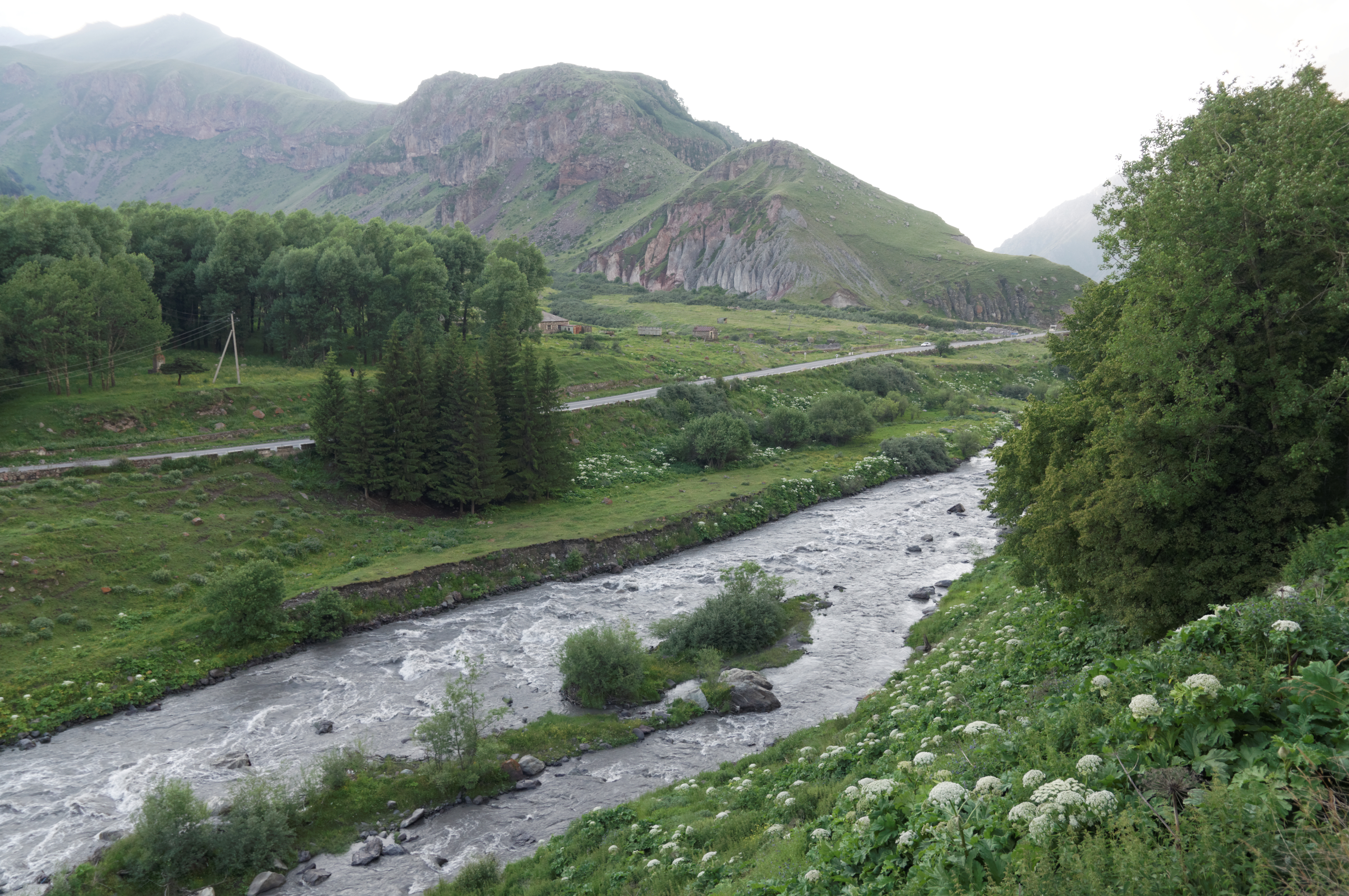
The Terek river in North Georgia

The Terek (Note: English: /ˈtɛrɪk/ TERR-ik; Russian: Терек, romanized: Terek, Russian pronunciation: [ˈtʲerʲɪk]; Kabardian: Тэрч, romanized: Tərč, pronounced [tʰɜrt͡ʃʰ]; Karachay-Balkar: Терк, romanized: Terk, pronounced [tʲeˈrʲĕk]; Georgian: თერგი, romanized: Tergi, pronounced [tʰɛɾgi]; Ossetian: Терк, romanized: Terk, pronounced [ˈtʲerk]; Kumyk: Терек-сув, romanized: Terek-suv, pronounced [tʲeˈrʲĕk suβ]; Nogai: Терк сув, romanized: Terk suw, pronounced [tʲeˈrʲĕk sʊw]; Chechen: Теркa, romanized: Terka, pronounced [ˈtʰʲerkʰə]; Ingush: Тийрк, romanized: Tiyrk, pronounced [ˈtʰʲiːrkʰ]; Lezgian: Терек, romanized: Terek, pronounced [ˈtʰɛrekʰ]; Armenian: Թերեք, romanized: Therekh, pronounced [tʰɛˈɹɛkʰ]; Azerbaijani: Терек чајы, romanized: Terek çayı, pronounced [teˈɾec tʃɑˈjɯ]; Avar: Терек, romanized: Terek, pronounced [ˈtʰerekʰ]) is a major river in the Northern Caucasus. It originates in the Mtskheta-Mtianeti region of Georgia and flows through North Caucasus region of Russia into the Caspian Sea. It rises near the juncture of the Greater Caucasus Mountain Range and the Khokh Range, to the southwest of Mount Kazbek, winding north in a white torrent between the town of Stepantsminda and the village of Gergeti toward the Russian region North Ossetia and the city of Vladikavkaz. It turns east to flow through Chechnya and Dagestan before dividing into two branches which empty into the Caspian Sea. Below the city of Kizlyar it forms a swampy river delta around 100 kilometres (62 mi) wide. The river is a key natural asset in the region, providing irrigation and hydroelectric power in its upper reaches.

The main cities on the Terek include Vladikavkaz, Mozdok, and Kizlyar. Several minor hydroelectric power stations dam the Terek: Dzau electrostation (in Vladikavkaz), Bekanskaya, and Pavlodolskaya.

The construction of the Dariali Hydropower Plant with a planned installed capacity of 108 MW started in 2011 on the territory of Kazbegi municipality near the Russia–Georgia border.

== Tributaries ==
The Terek's source is in the Truso Gorge and drains most of the northeast Caucasus east into the Caspian just as its sister, the Kuban, drains the northwest Caucasus west into the Black Sea. Its major tributaries are the following. In the west, a fan of rivers flows east and northeast into the Terek. These are the east-flowing Malka, the Baksan, the Chegem and the Cherek with its two branches. These three join the Malka just before it reaches the Terek. The Liashen, Urukh, Duradur and Duradon flow northeast, the Ardon and its tributary, the Fiagdon flow north and the Gizeldon drains the north slope of Mount Kazbek and reaches the Terek near the mouth of the Ardon. Then there is the north-flowing part of the Terek with the Darial Pass, with two eastern tributaries: Kistinka and Armkhi, flowing into the mountainous region of Ingushetia. The great northwest bend of the Terek is cut off by the northeast-flowing Sunzha which catches most of the north-flowing rivers. These are the north-flowing upper Sunzha, the Assa, the Argun and Khukhulau. East of these are the Aksay and the Aktash, which formerly dried up in the lowlands between the Sulak and the Terek. In the east, the Sulak drains most of interior Dagestan and turns east to the Caspian before it reaches the Terek.

== Human history ==
In the Georgian Royal Annals the river bore the name Lomeki, derived from the Ingush designation for the upper reaches of the Terek River and translates from the Ingush language as “mountain water”.

The capital of Khazaria, Samandar, may have stood on the banks of the river Terek.

The Terek river was the site of the defeat of the army of Hulagu, khan of the Ilkhanate, at the hands of the army of Berke, khan of the Golden Horde, led by Berke's nephew, Nogai Khan, in the first civil war of the Mongol Empire, the Berke–Hulagu war of 1262. Also on the river, Timur defeated Tokhtamysh in 1395.

The Terek Cossack Host (1577–1832 and 1860–) had its base in the Terek basin. During the Russian conquest of the Caucasus, it was part of the North Caucasus Line. Leo Tolstoy's novel The Cossacks is set on the Terek and amongst its Cossacks.

During World War II, German forces at the end of August 1942 reached the Terek near Mozdok – the furthest extent of German conquests in the Soviet Union – but aside from a small bridgehead were unable to forge further toward the oil fields of Baku, Hitler's objective. The Germans penetrated the left bank of the Terek reaching Vladikavkaz suburbs and West Gizel, near the now built weather station.

== See also ==
- Terek sandpiper, a wading bird first discovered at the estuary of the Terek
- Terek Cossacks
