= Stepantsminda =

Stepantsminda სტეფანწმინდა
- Townlet
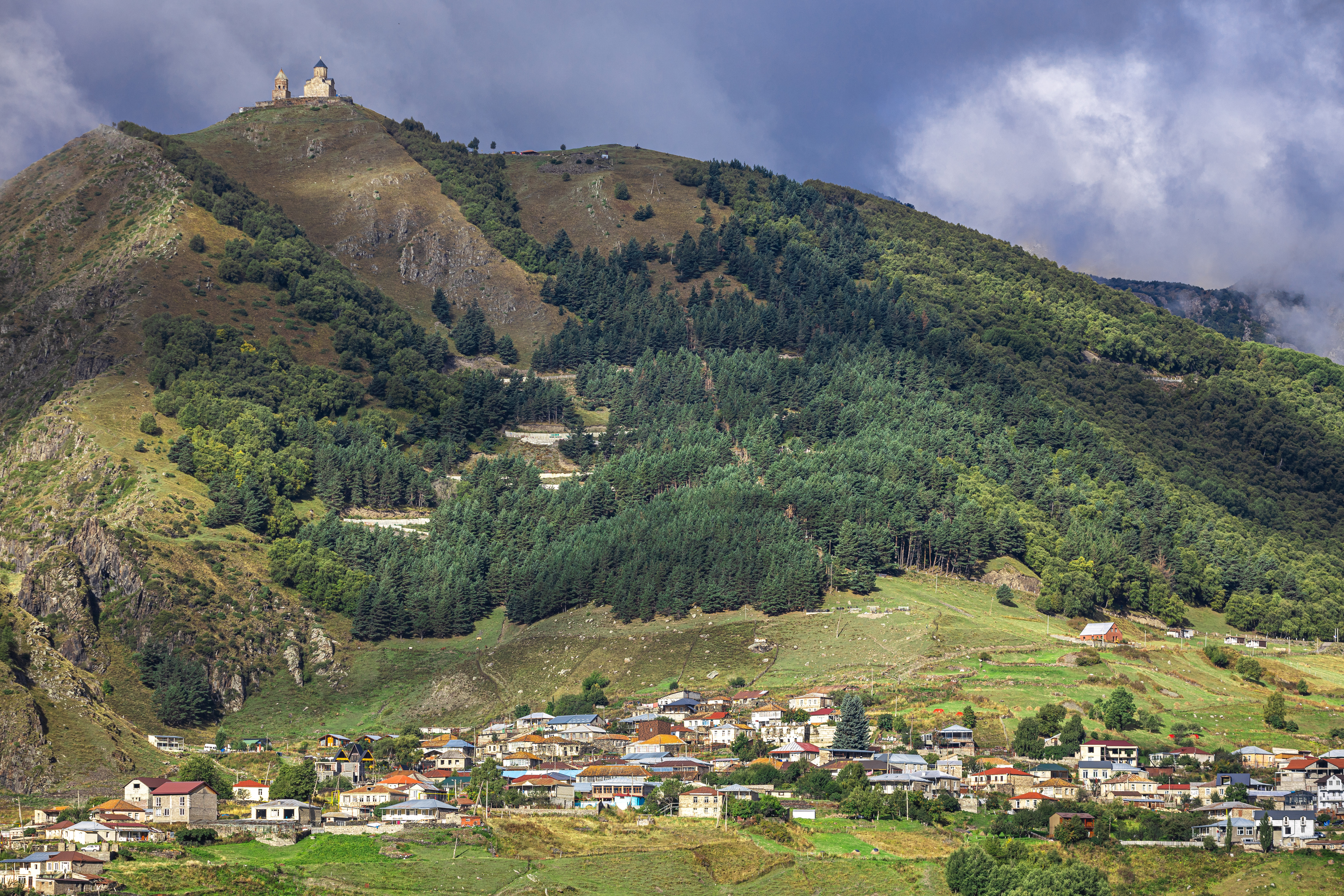
- View of Stepantsminda in September 2023
- Interactive map of Stepantsminda
- Location within Georgia Location within Mtskheta-Mtianeti
- Coordinates: 42°39′27″N 44°38′43″E
- Country: Georgia
- Mkhare: Mtskheta-Mtianeti
- Municipality: Kazbegi
- Elevation: 1,740 m (5,710 ft)

Population (2014)
  - Total: 1,326
- Time zone: UTC+4 (Georgian Time)

Stepantsminda (Georgian: სტეფანწმინდა; formerly Kazbegi, ყაზბეგი) is a townlet in the Mtskheta-Mtianeti region of north-eastern Georgia. Historically and ethnographically, the town is part of the Khevi province. It is the center of the Kazbegi Municipality.

== Etymology ==
Stepantsminda was named after a Georgian Orthodox monk named Stephan, who constructed a hermitage at this location, as well as advising people to relocate a little bit south in order to avoid the effect of regular snow avalanche.

== Geography and climate ==
The town is located along the banks of the Terek River, 157 kilometers (98 mi) to the north of Tbilisi at an elevation of 1,740 meters (5,710 feet) above sea level. Stepantsminda’s climate is moderately humid with relatively dry, cold winters and long and cool summers. The average annual temperature is 4.9 degrees Celsius. January is the coldest month with an average temperature of -5.2 degrees Celsius while July is the warmest month with an average temperature of 14.4 degrees Celsius. The absolute minimum recorded temperature is -34 degrees Celsius and the absolute maximum is 32 degrees Celsius. Stepantsminda’s average annual precipitation is 790 mm. (31.1 inches). The town is dominated by large mountains on all sides. The most notable mountain of the region, Mount Kazbek of the Lateral Range, lies immediately to the west of town. The second most prominent peak, Mt. Shani, rises to an elevation of 4,451 meters (14,600 feet) above sea level, 9 kilometers to the east of Stepantsminda. The town is located 10 kilometers to the south of the famous Darial Gorge.

Climate data for Stepantsminda
Month	Jan	Feb	Mar	Apr	May	Jun	Jul	Aug	Sep	Oct	Nov	Dec	Year
Mean daily maximum °C (°F)	−1.9 (28.6)	−1.5 (29.3)	2.7 (36.9)	8.8 (47.8)	14.2 (57.6)	17.5 (63.5)	20.2 (68.4)	20.2 (68.4)	16.4 (61.5)	11.4 (52.5)	4.4 (39.9)	0.0 (32.0)	9.4 (48.9)
Daily mean °C (°F)	−6.5 (20.3)	−6.1 (21.0)	−2.0 (28.4)	3.0 (37.4)	8.3 (46.9)	11.3 (52.3)	13.9 (57.0)	13.9 (57.0)	9.9 (49.8)	5.7 (42.3)	0.0 (32.0)	−4.3 (24.3)	3.9 (39.1)
Mean daily minimum °C (°F)	−11.1 (12.0)	−10.7 (12.7)	−6.6 (20.1)	−2.7 (27.1)	2.5 (36.5)	5.2 (41.4)	7.7 (45.9)	7.7 (45.9)	3.5 (38.3)	0.0 (32.0)	−4.3 (24.3)	−8.5 (16.7)	−1.4 (29.4)
Average precipitation mm (inches)	34 (1.3)	38 (1.5)	66 (2.6)	103 (4.1)	145 (5.7)	132 (5.2)	126 (5.0)	149 (5.9)	82 (3.2)	69 (2.7)	62 (2.4)	37 (1.5)	1,043 (41.1)
Source: Climate-Data.org

== History ==
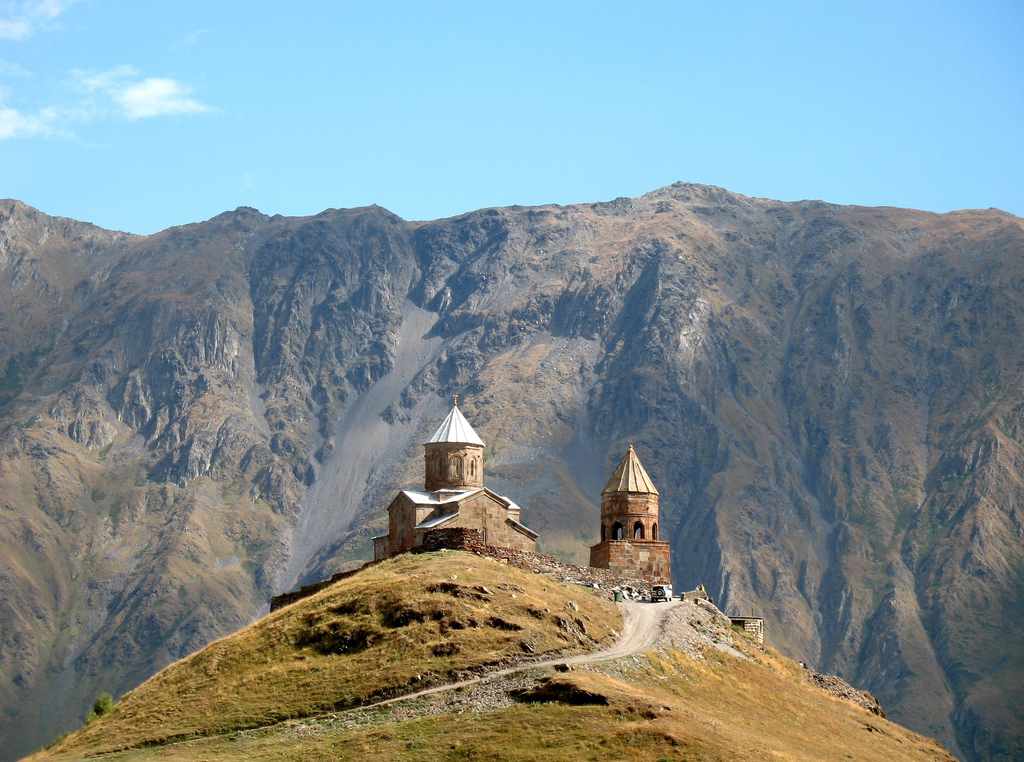
The Gergeti Trinity Church, the main cultural landmark of Stepantsminda.

According to tradition, Stepantsminda, literally "Saint Stephan", was named so after a Georgian Orthodox monk Stephan, who constructed a hermitage at this location on what later became the Georgian Military Highway. It came under the control of a local feudal magnate, the Chopikashvili clan, who were in charge of collecting tolls on travelers in the area in the late 18th century.

After the expansion of the Russian Empire into the Kingdom of Georgia in the early 19th century, the people of the region revolted against Russian rule. However, the local lord Gabriel Chopikashvili, son of Kazi-Beg, remained steadfast in his loyalty to Russia and helped to suppress the revolt. In return, he was promoted to officer in the Russian Army. He adopted the surname Kazbegi, and the village under his control was also frequently referred to as "Kazbegi". In 1917-1918 Stepantsminda was taken by Germany, Turkey and The Whites, bar the last who stayed until 1922. The name was officially changed to Kazbegi under Soviet rule in 1925. Gabriel Chopikashvili-Kazbegi's grandson was the famed Georgian writer Alexander Kazbegi, who was born in this town. In 2006, the town reverted to its original name of Stepantsminda.

== Attractions and sport facilities ==
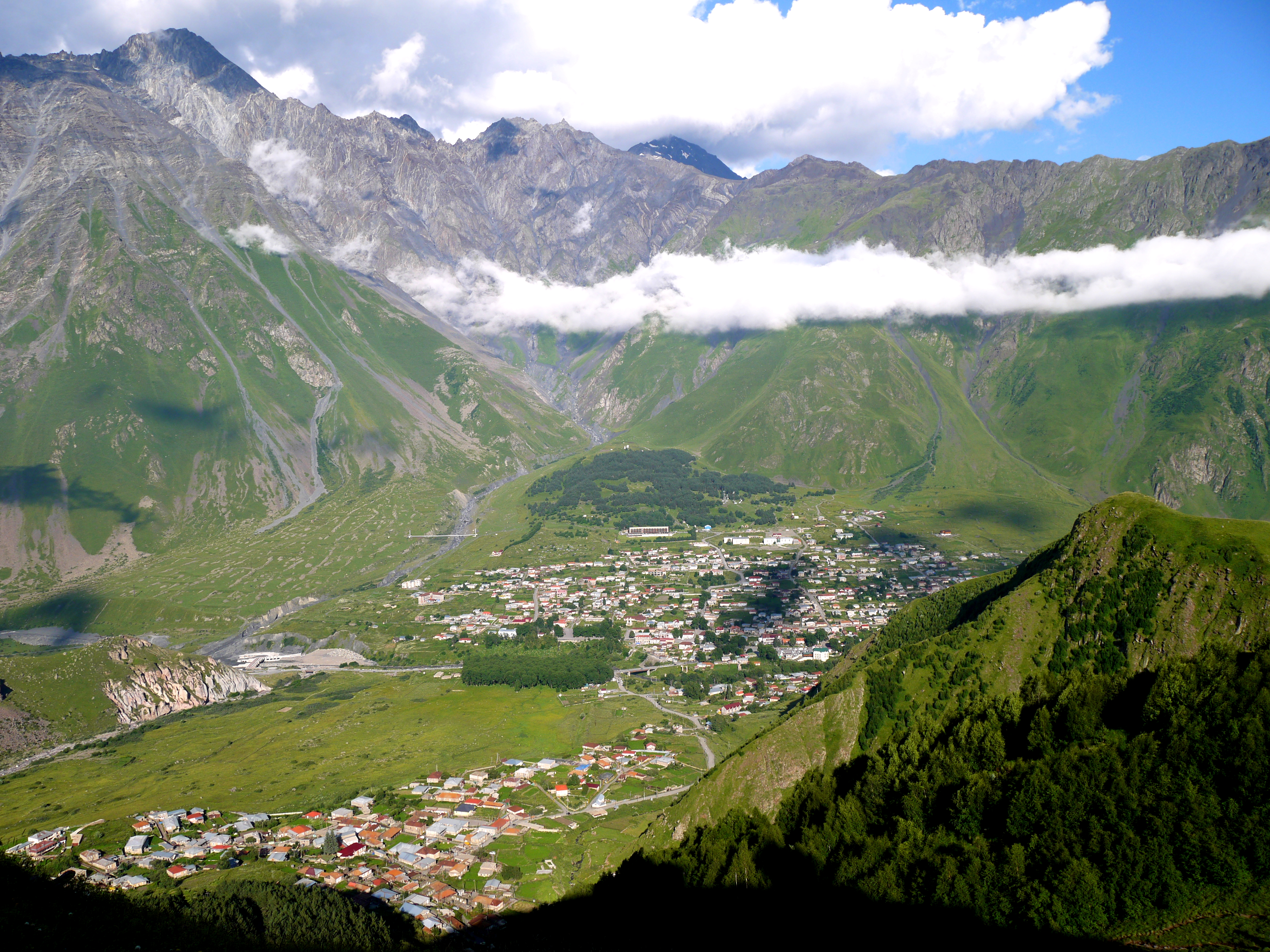
Stepantsminda along with Kuro and Shino glaciers

- Horse-riding
- Paragliding
- Bike-riding
- Gergeti Sameba Church
- Natural mineral waters
- Mount Kazbek climbing
- Glaciers
- Waterfall Gveleti

== Landmarks ==
Stepantsminda is known for its scenic location in the Greater Caucasus mountains, and is a center for trekkers and mountain climbing. Local attractions include the Kazbegi Museum and Ethnographic Museum in town, and the Gergeti Trinity Church outside of town, as well as Mount Kazbegi itself and the alpine meadows and forests of the surrounding Kazbegi National Park.

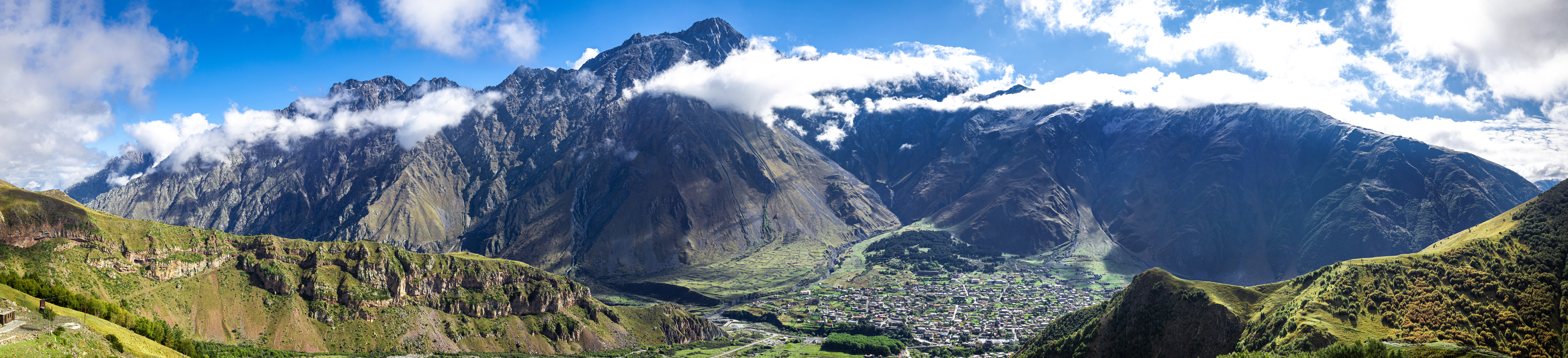

== Border crossing point to Russia ==
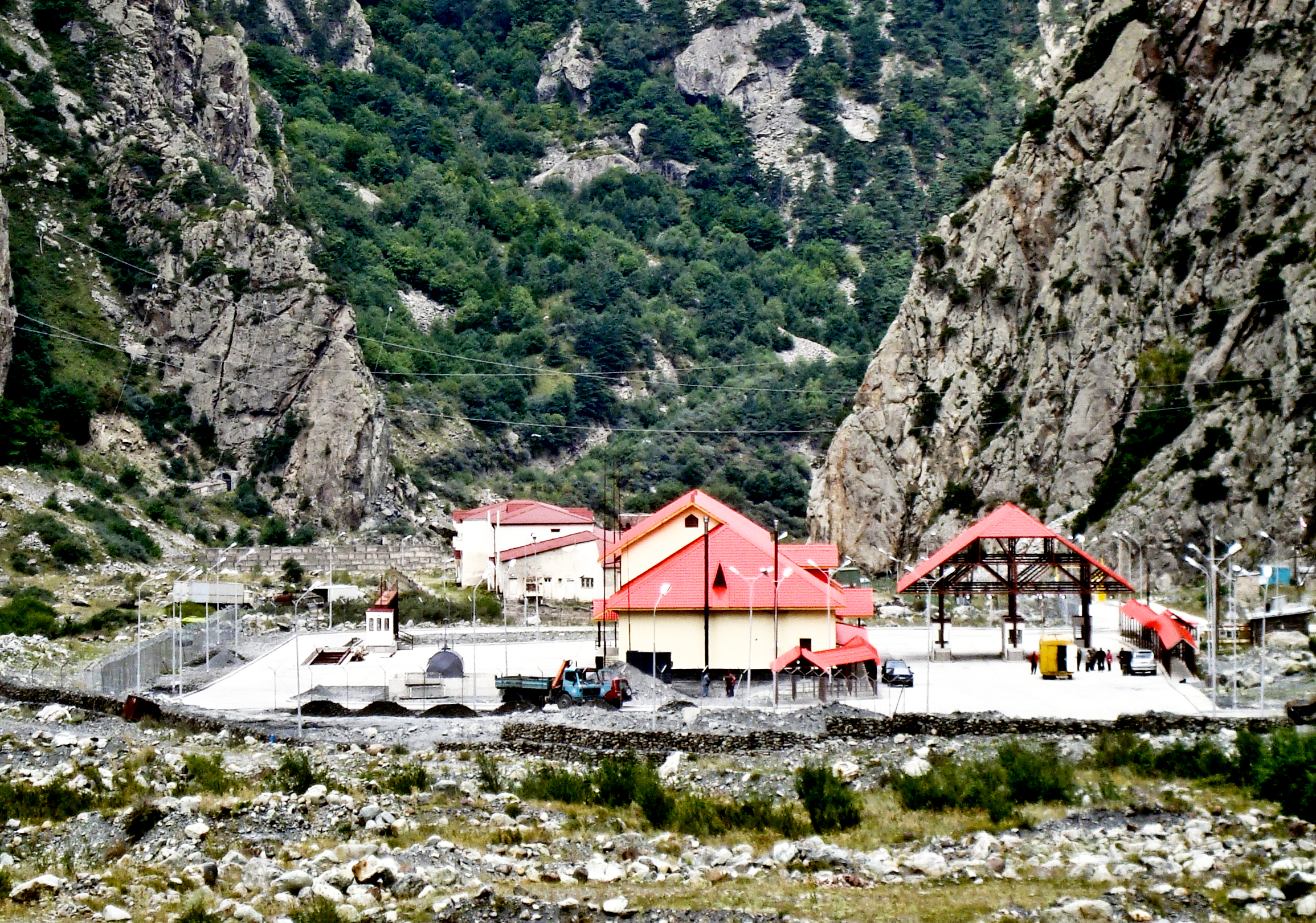
Georgian part of the border crossing point.

The Larsi border crossing checkpoint on the Georgia–Russia border is located approximately 12 kilometers north of Stepantsminda. The crossing was opened on 1 March 2010. It is open 24 hours. The customs are multilateral, for all citizens of the world. The cross-border road is in a mountain tunnel. It is not possible to cross the border on foot.

== Infrastructure ==
In December 2016 it was announced that AGH holding company plans to build an international airport in Stepantsminda. AGH founded "Aviator" company will provide Air Taxi service that will comprise individual charter flights to any airports in Georgia as well as to neighboring countries.

== See also ==
- Mtskheta-Mtianeti
