= Kazbegi Municipality =

Coordinates: 42°39′27″N 44°38′43″E

Kazbegi Municipality ყაზბეგის მუნიციპალიტეტი
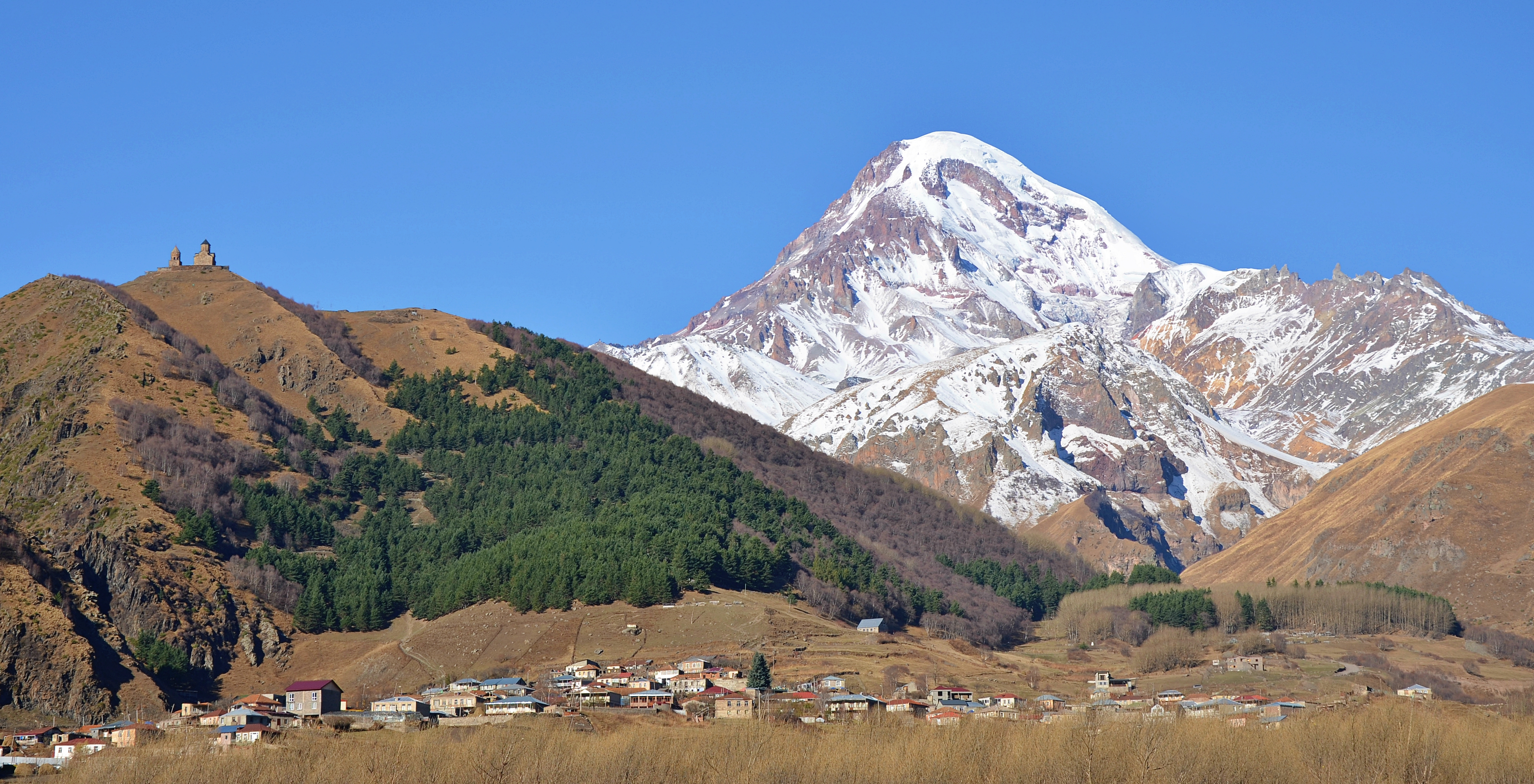
- Mount Kazbek

- Flag Seal

- Country: Georgia
- Mkhare: Mtskheta-Mtianeti
- Capital: Stepantsminda

Area
  - Total: 1,081.7 km^{2} (417.6 sq mi)

Population (2014)
  - Total: 3 795
  - Density: 0.0028/km^{2} (0.0072/sq mi)
- Time zone: UTC+4 (Georgian Time)

Kazbegi (Georgian: ყაზბეგის მუნიციპალიტეტი) is a district of Georgia, in the region of Mtskheta-Mtianeti in east-north Georgia.

The main settlement is Stepantsminda, accounting for about half of the total population.

Kazbegi Municipality is situated in the upper valley of the Terek River, which goes on to traverse the Georgia–Russia border to the north and eventually drains into the Caspian Sea in Dagestan, Russian Federation. By the conventional definition of the Europe-Asia boundary as following the watershed of the Greater Caucasus, Kazbegi Municipality is geographically a European part of Georgia.

== Landmarks ==
Kazbegi Municipality is known for its scenic location in the Greater Caucasus mountains, and it is a center for trekkers and mountain climbing. Local attractions include the Kazbegi Museum and Ethnographic Museum in town, and the Gergeti Trinity Church outside of town, as well as Mount Kazbegi itself and the alpine meadows and forests of the surrounding Kazbegi Nature Reserve, Juta mountain, Gveleti Waterfall, Truso valley and Abudelauri blue lakes.

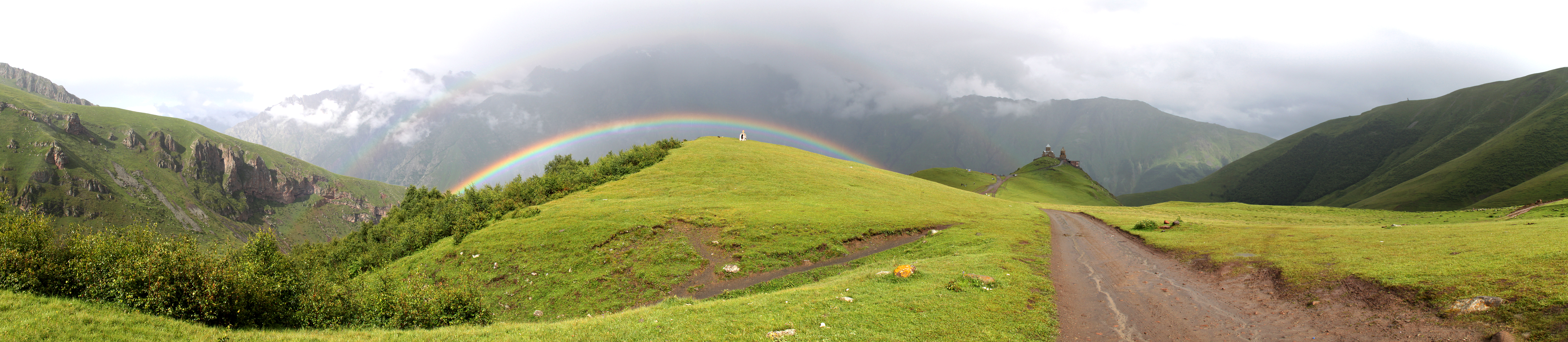
Gergeti Trinity Church and background rainbow

== Attractions and sport facilities ==
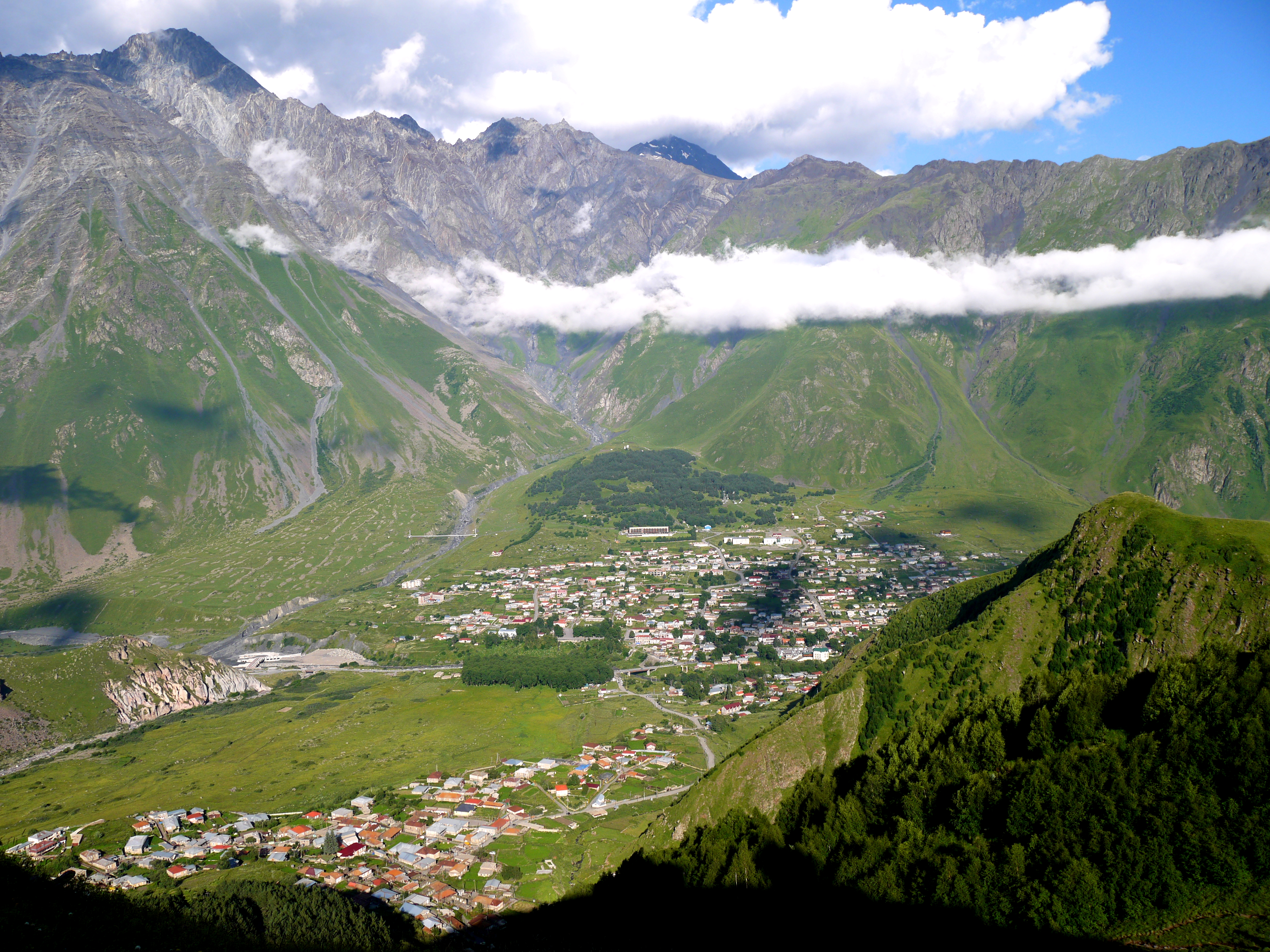
Stepantsminda along with Kuro and Shino glaciers

- Horse-riding
- Paragliding
- Bike-riding
- Gergeti Trinity Church
- Natural mineral waters
- Mount Kazbek climbing
- Glaciers
- Waterfall Gveleti

Chaukhi Mountains as seen from the village of Juta.

== Politics ==
Kazbegi Municipal Assembly (Georgian: ყაზბეგის საკრებულო) is a representative body in Kazbegi Municipality. currently consisting of 18 members. The council is assembles into session regularly, to consider subject matters such as code changes, utilities, taxes, city budget, oversight of city government and more. Kazbegi sakrebulo is elected every four year. The last election was held in October 2021.

Party	2017	2021	Current Municipal Assembly
Georgian Dream	12	12	
Mechiauri for United Georgia		1	
United National Movement		1	
For Georgia		1	
European Socialists		1	
Alliance of Patriots	3	1	
For the People		1	
Democratic Movement	1		
European Georgia	1		
Traditionalists	1		
National Democratic Movement	1		
Labour Party	1		
Sakartvelo	1		
Total	21	18	

== See also ==
- List of municipalities in Georgia (country)
