= Mtskheta-Mtianeti =

Region of Georgia

Coordinates: 42°17′N 44°45′E

Mtskheta-Mtianeti მცხეთა-მთიანეთი
- Mkhare (region)
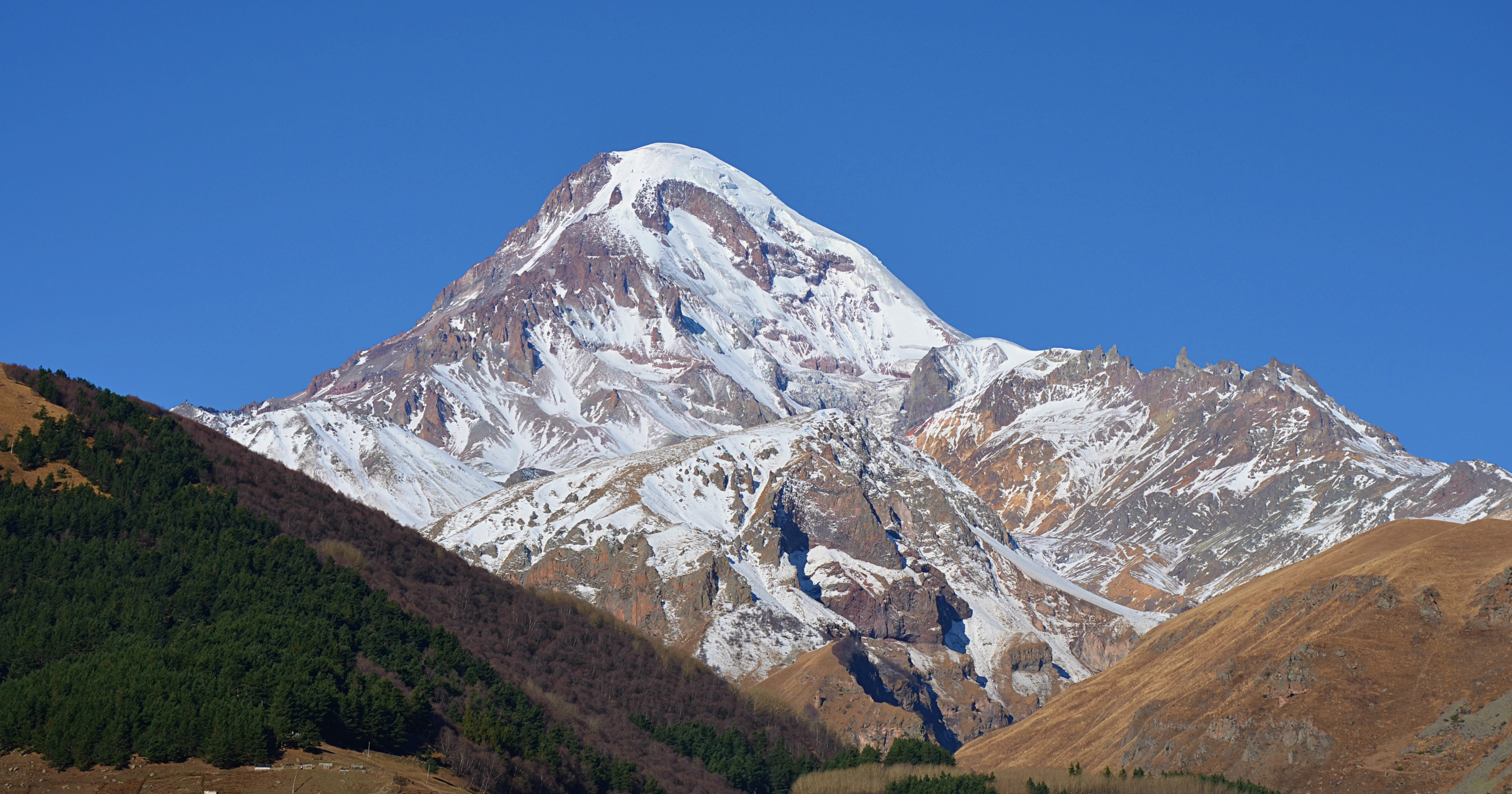
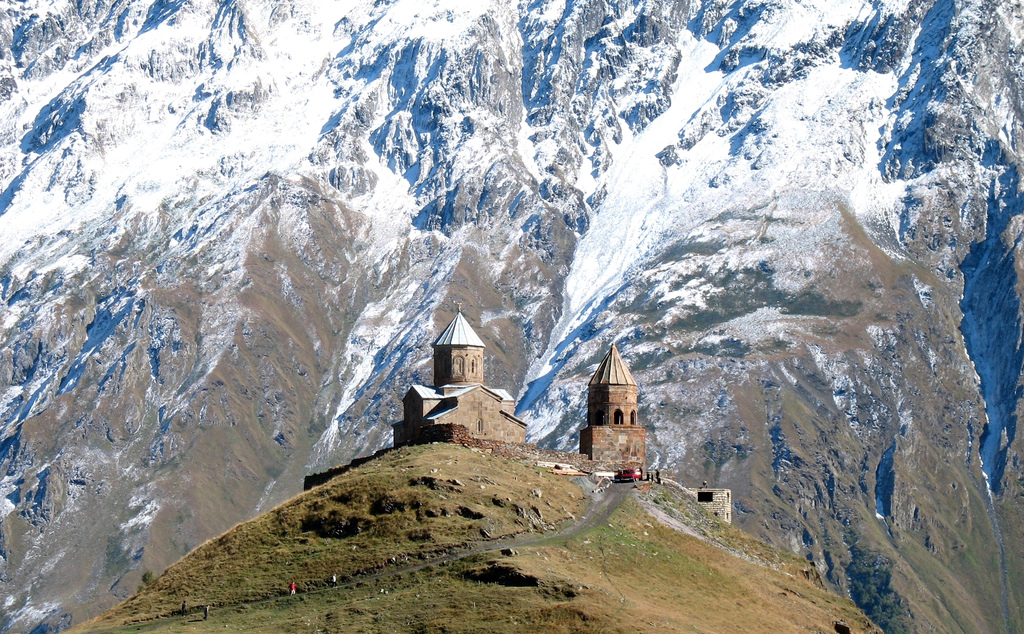
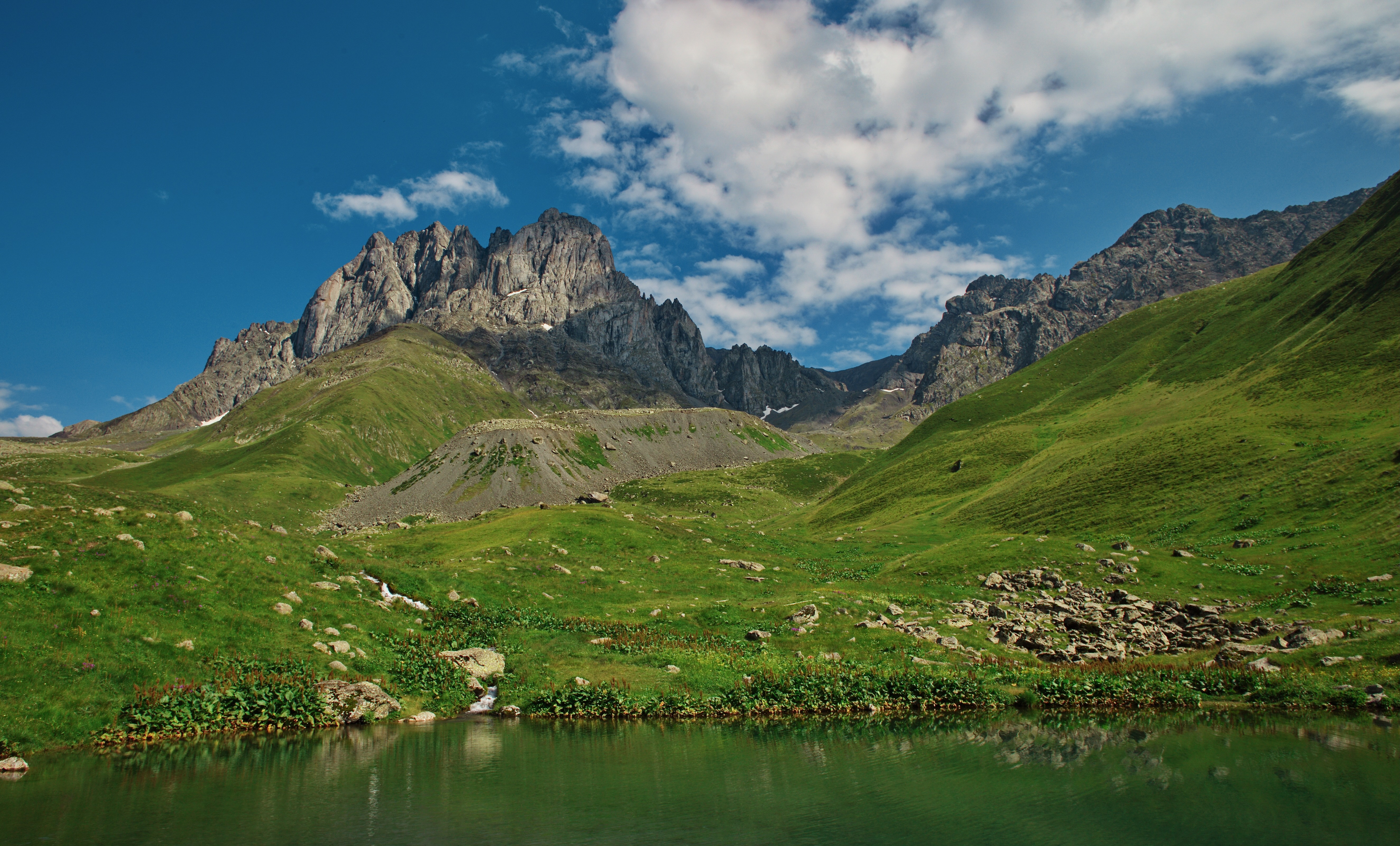
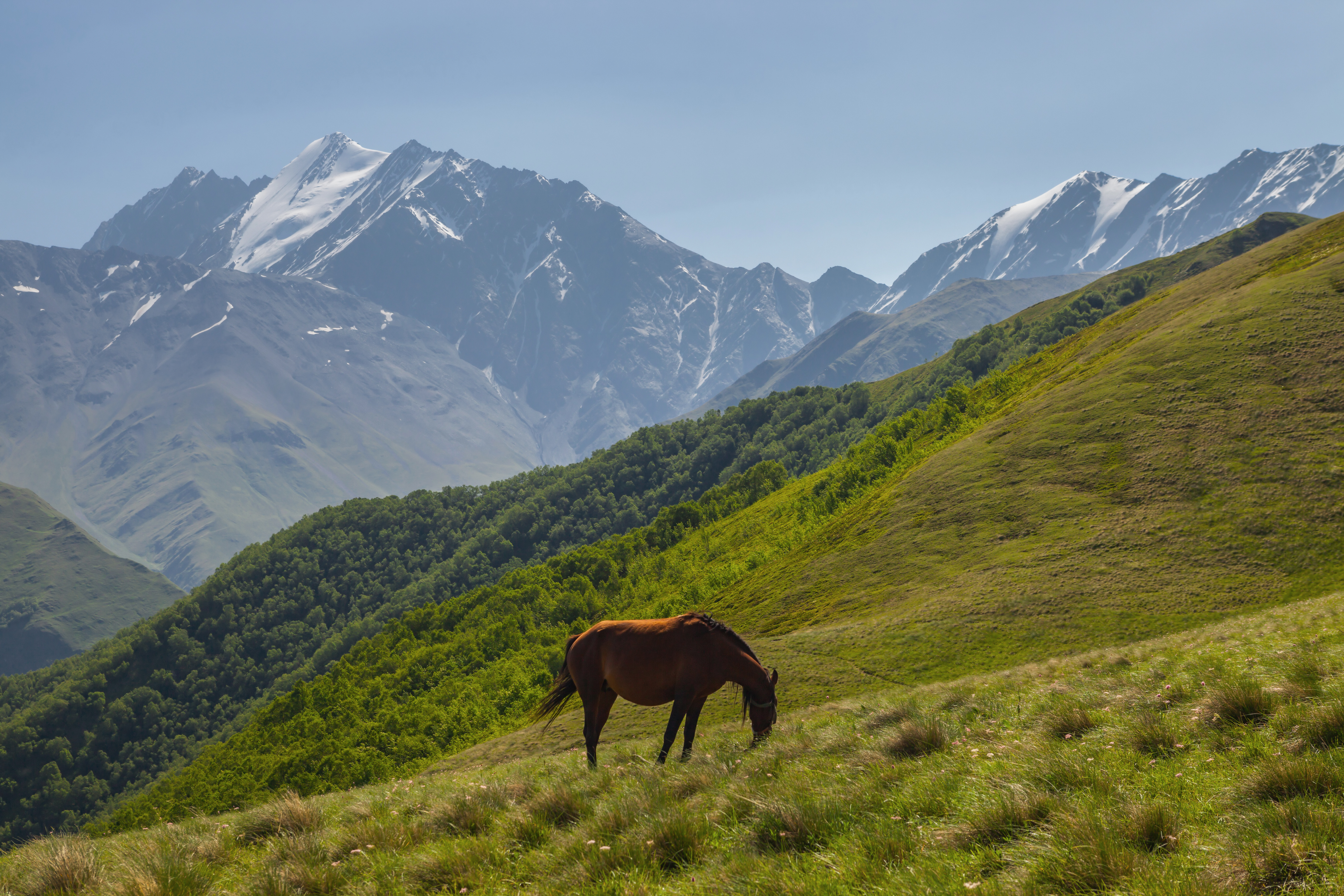
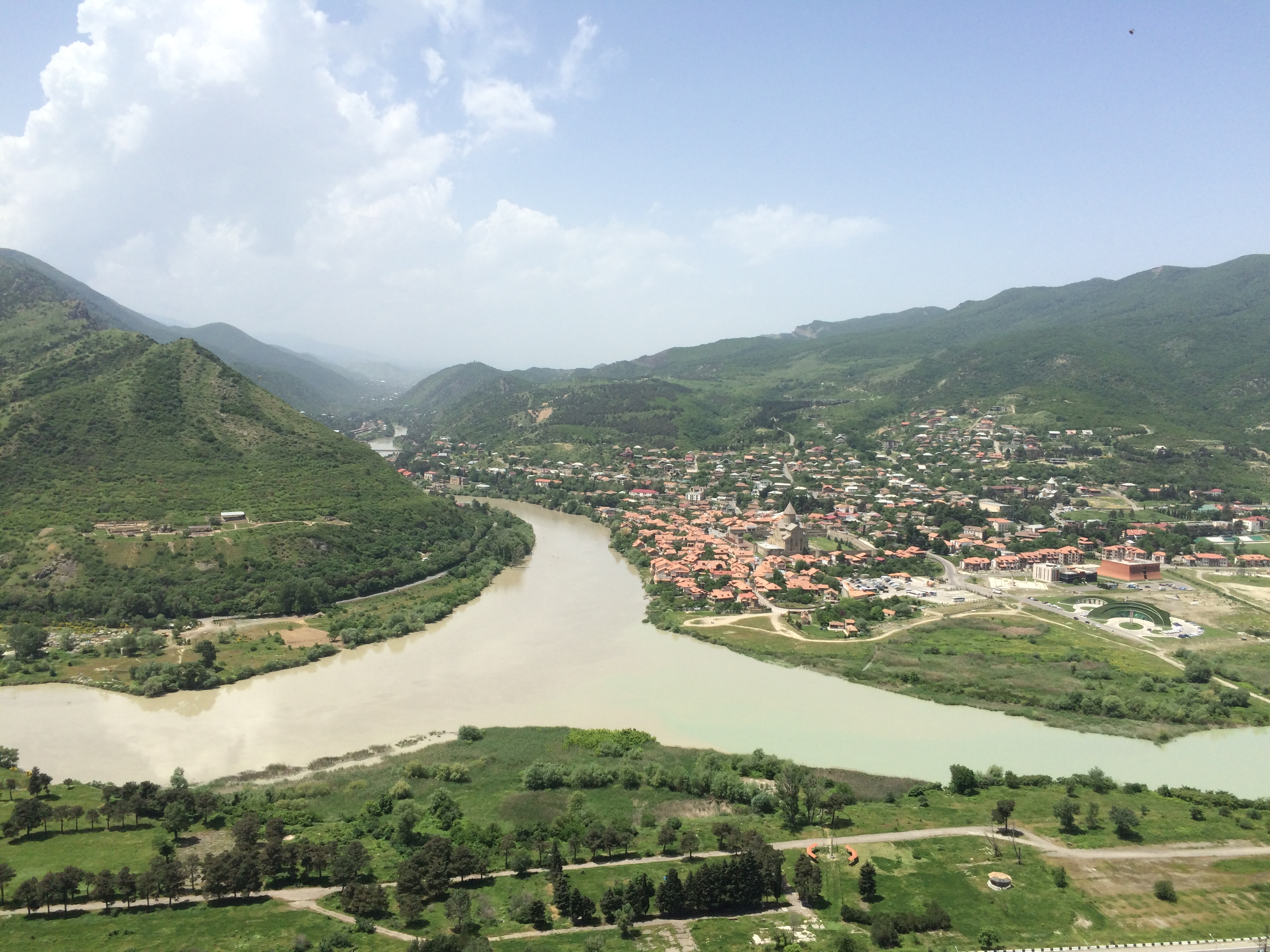
- From the top to bottom-right: Kazbegi National Park, Gergeti Trinity Church, Lake Tina in Juta Valley, Pshav-Khevsureti National Park, Mtskheta

- Overlapping borders of de jure Mtskheta-Mtianeti region and de facto South Ossetia (Note: South Ossetia's status is disputed. It considers itself to be an independent state, but this is recognised by only a few other countries. The Georgian government and most of the world's other states consider South Ossetia de jure a part of Georgia's territory.)
- Country: Georgia
- Seat: Mtskheta
- Subdivisions: 5 Municipalities

Government
  - Governor: Davit Nozadze

Area
  - Total: 5,606 km^{2} (2,164 sq mi)

Population (2021)
  - Total: 93,389
  - Density: 16.66/km^{2} (43.15/sq mi)

Gross Regional Product
  - Total: ₾ 1.63 billion (2022)
  - Per Capita: ₾ 17,720 (2022)
- ISO 3166 code: GE-MM
- HDI (2023): 0.797 high · 10th
- Website: www.mtskheta-mtianeti.gov.ge

Mtskheta-Mtianeti (Georgian: მცხეთა-მთიანეთი, IPA: [mt͡sʰχetʰa‿mtʰianetʰi]) is a region (mkhare) in eastern Georgia comprising the town of Mtskheta, which serves as a regional capital, together with its district and the adjoining mountainous areas. The western part of the region, namely the entire Akhalgori Municipality, is controlled by breakaway South Ossetia since the 2008 Russo-Georgian War.

== Administrative divisions ==
The Mtskheta-Mtianeti region officially comprises five municipalities, yet only four are effectively under Georgian authority:

Municipality	Pop. (2021)	Town/Village	Pop. (2021)
Akhalgori (Note: With the formation of mkhare (regions) in 1995, Akhalgori was officially classified as part of the Mtskheta-Mtianeti region. Since the 2008 Russo-Georgian War the Georgian central government lost effective controle over Akhalgori.)	3,665	Akhalgori	1,033 (2015)
Dusheti	26,328	Dusheti	6,864
Kazbegi	3,781	Stepantsminda	1,443
Mtskheta	53,006	Mtskheta	7,606
Tianeti	10,274	Tianeti	3,084
Source: Geostat

== See also ==
- Subdivisions of Georgia
