= Fiagdon =

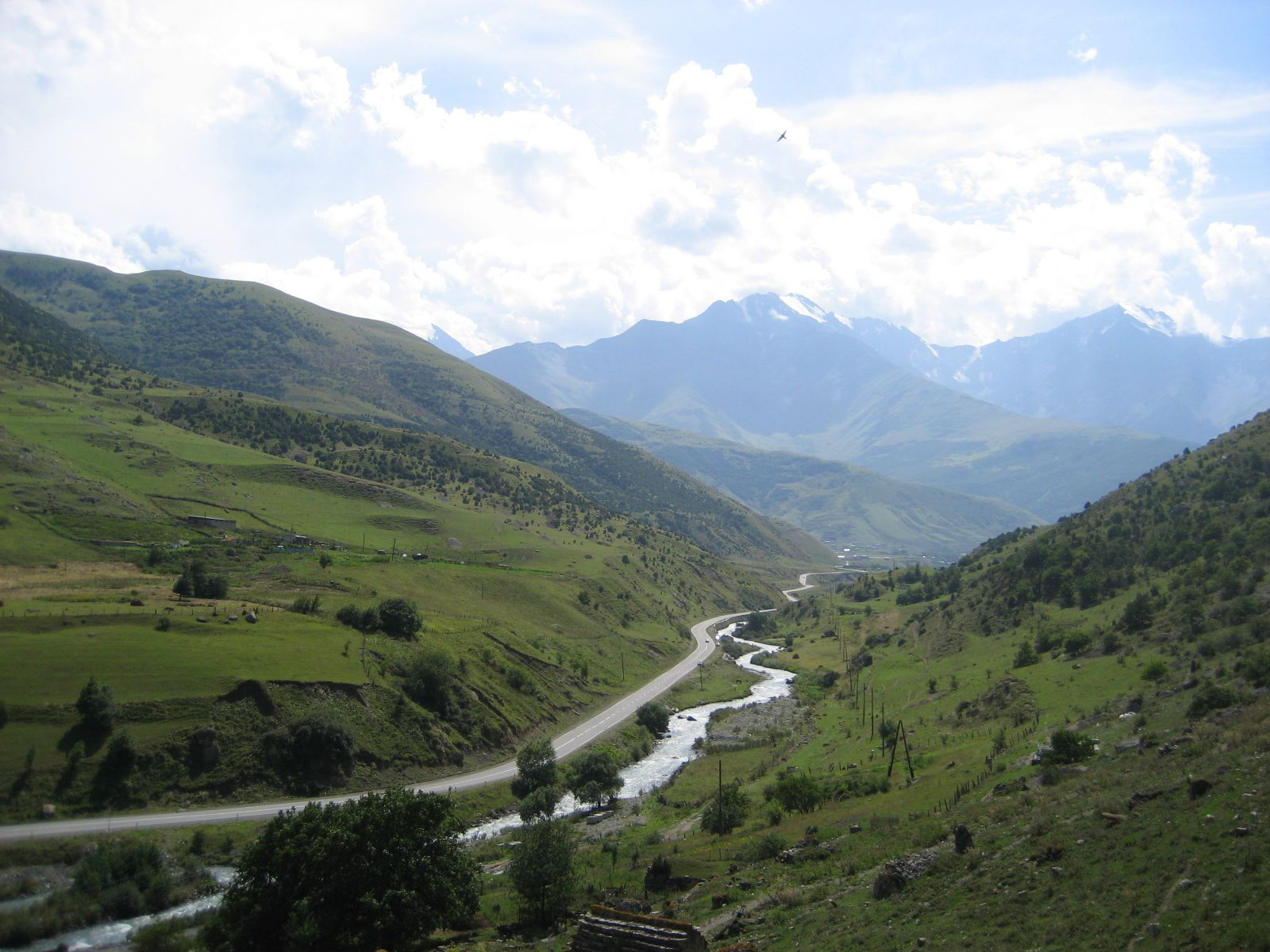
- Fiagdon River in Kurtat valley

- Location within North Ossetia–Alania Location within Caucasus Mountains Location within European Russia

Location
- Country: Russia
- Republic: North Ossetia–Alania

Physical characteristics
- Source
  - location: Caucasus Mountains
- Mouth: Ardon
  - coordinates: 43°12′31″N 44°19′55″E
- Length: 75 km (47 mi)
- Basin size: 714 km^{2} (276 mi^{2})

Basin features
- Progression: Ardon→ Terek→ Caspian Sea

Fiagdon (Russian: Фиагдон, Iron Ossetic: Фыййагдон, Fyjjagdon) is a river in North Ossetia–Alania (Russia) west of Vladikavkaz. It flows north between the Ardon and the Gizeldon and joins the Ardon before that river joins the Terek. The river is 75 kilometres (47 mi) long, with a drainage basin of 714 square kilometres (276 mi^{2}). Verkhny Fiagdon and Dzuarikau are some of the major villages that lie on Fiagdon River.

== Etymology ==
Fiagdon is a river in Russia, located in the Republic of North Ossetia-Alania. The name of the river is derived from the Ossetian words "fiyag" and "don", which mean "wooden shovel" and "water/river" respectively. According to local legends, the Kurtatinsky gorge, where the river flows, was once entirely covered with thick forest and the river was covered with moss. The first settlers of the gorge used wooden shovels to clear the riverbed and take water from it. This is believed to be the origin of the name "Fiagdon".

== State Water Registry Data ==
The code of the river in the State Water Register is 07020000112108200003368.
