= Zaramag hydroelectric power station =

Hydro power complex in North Ossetia, Russia

Head HPP
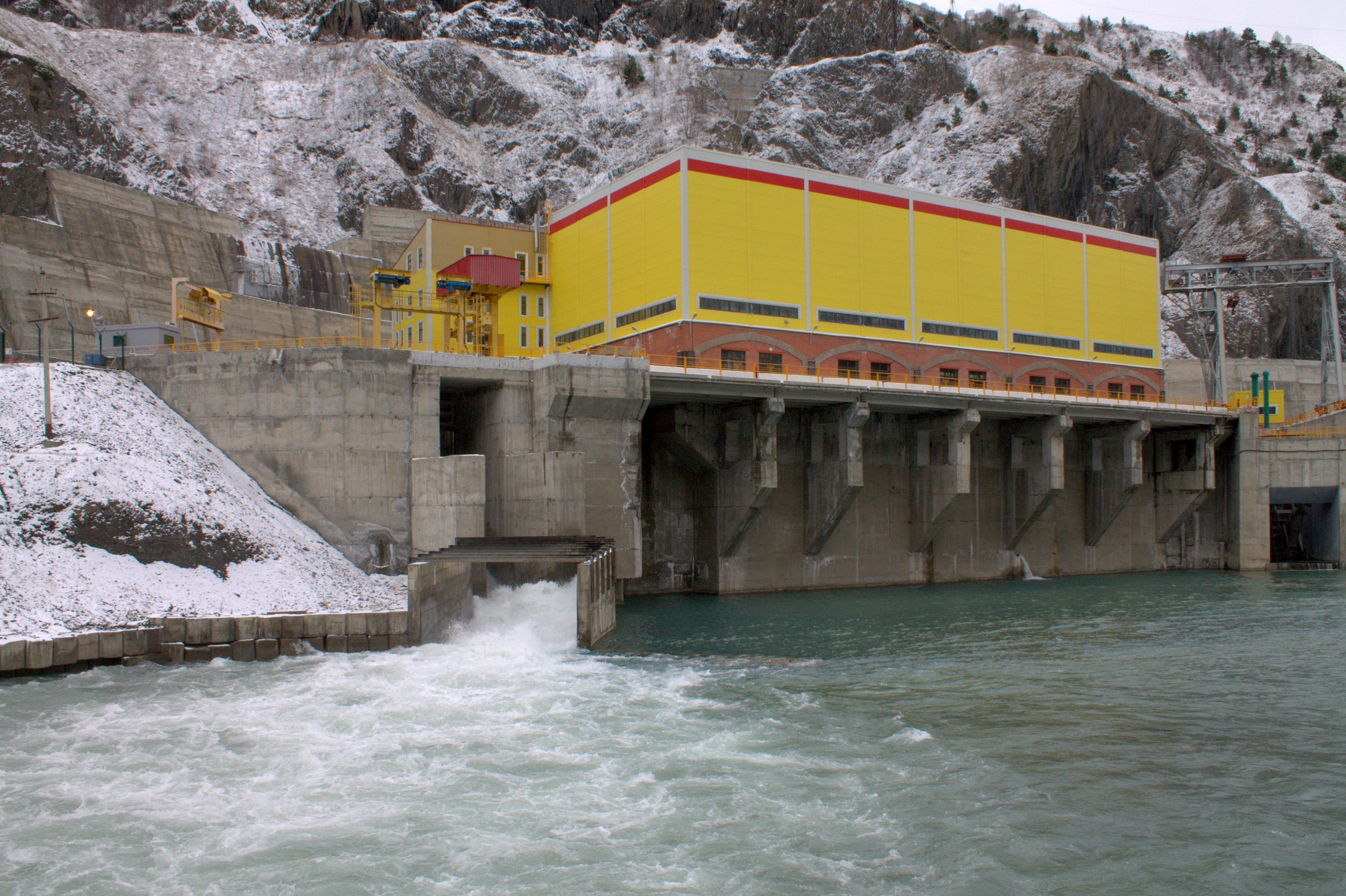
- Building of the Head HPP
- Country: Russia
- Location: North Ossetia
- Coordinates: 42°49′48″N 44°02′20″E
- Status: operating
- Construction began: 1976
- Commission date: 2009
- Owner: RusHydro

Power generation
- Nameplate capacity: 15 MW

External links
- Commons: Related media on Commons

Zaramag Hydroelectric Power Stations (Ossetian: Зæрæмæджы ГЭС) is a hydro power complex on the Ardon River in the Alagir District of North Ossetia, consisting of two interconnected hydroelectric power stations — the Head HPS and Zaramag HPS-1. Construction of the complex began in 1976, the Head HPS was commissioned in 2009, and Zaramag HPS-1 in 2020. The project was implemented in difficult natural conditions and features a number of unique technical solutions for Russian hydro power — in particular, Zaramag HPS-1 has the highest head in Russia, the most powerful Pelton turbines, and the longest diversion tunnel. Zaramag HPS-1 is the largest power station in North Ossetia and the third most powerful hydroelectric power station in the North Caucasus. The hydroelectric power stations are owned by PJSC "RusHydro" and operated by the company's North Ossetian branch.

== Natural conditions ==
The facilities of the Zaramag HPSs are located on a section of the upper reaches of the Ardon River (a tributary of the Terek) from the village of Nizhny Zaramag, where the river emerges from the Tuall Basin (in which four main tributaries of the river merge — mamison, Nardon, Adai, and Tsimakomdon), to the confluence with the Baddon River, with a length of about 16 km. On this section, the river flows through mountainous terrain at elevations of 1730–1010 meters, in the narrow (width at the bottom 20–40 m) Kassar Gorge, up to 600–800 m deep and with slopes up to 45°. The gorge cuts through the Bokovoy Ridge, composed of rocky metamorphic (slates) and igneous (granites) rocks, disrupted by tectonic disturbances and crushing zones. The floodplain part of the valley is filled with a layer of alluvial and lacustrine-alluvial deposits up to 45 m thick; at a depth of about 25 m among this thickness at the base of the dam lies a layer of loamy loams. Construction of the facilities is complicated by the presence of numerous tectonic zones in the rocky rocks and active development of slope processes (landslides, rockfalls, debris flows, snow avalanches). The seismicity of the construction area is 8-9 points on the MSK-64 scale (for rocky and soft soils, respectively). The Ardon River at the alignment of the Head HPS has a catchment area of 552 km², average annual flow — 17.6 m³/s, average annual runoff — 530 million m³. The maximum design flow with 1% probability (once every 100 years) is 286 m³/s, 0.1% (once every 1000 years) — 474 m³/s, the minimum observed flow — 1.0 m³/s. In the area of the Zaramag HPSs, the Ardon River has the character of a turbulent water flow with velocities of 2.5–3.5 m/s. The intra-annual distribution of the river's runoff is extremely uneven, with up to 85–90% of the annual runoff passing in the spring-summer period; the river's hydrological regime is characterized by turbulent convective floods against the background of glacial runoff. The river carries a lot of sediment, their annual runoff is estimated at 235 thousand m³. The climate of the construction area is continental, with moderately cold winters and warm summers. The absolute maximum temperature at the Head HPS alignment is 32°C, the absolute minimum −34°C. The maximum wind speed reaches 30 m/s. The Transcaucasian Highway passes through the Ardon River valley in the construction zone. The main facilities of the hydroelectric power stations are located in the protected zone of the North Ossetian State Nature Reserve, and diversion tunnel No. 2 directly crosses the reserve's territory.

== Description ==
The Zaramag hydro node is a complex of interconnected facilities divided into two groups: facilities of the head node (Head HPS) and facilities of Zaramag HPS-1. The Head HPS is built according to a run-of-river scheme and uses the head created by an earthen dam. Zaramag HPS is of diversion type and uses the head created by a long diversion tunnel. The total installed capacity of the HPS complex is 356 mW (including Head HPS — 10 mW, Zaramag HPS-1 — 346 mW), the total average annual generation is 865 million kWh (including Head HPS — 23 million kWh, Zaramag HPS-1 — 842 million kWh).

=== Head node ===
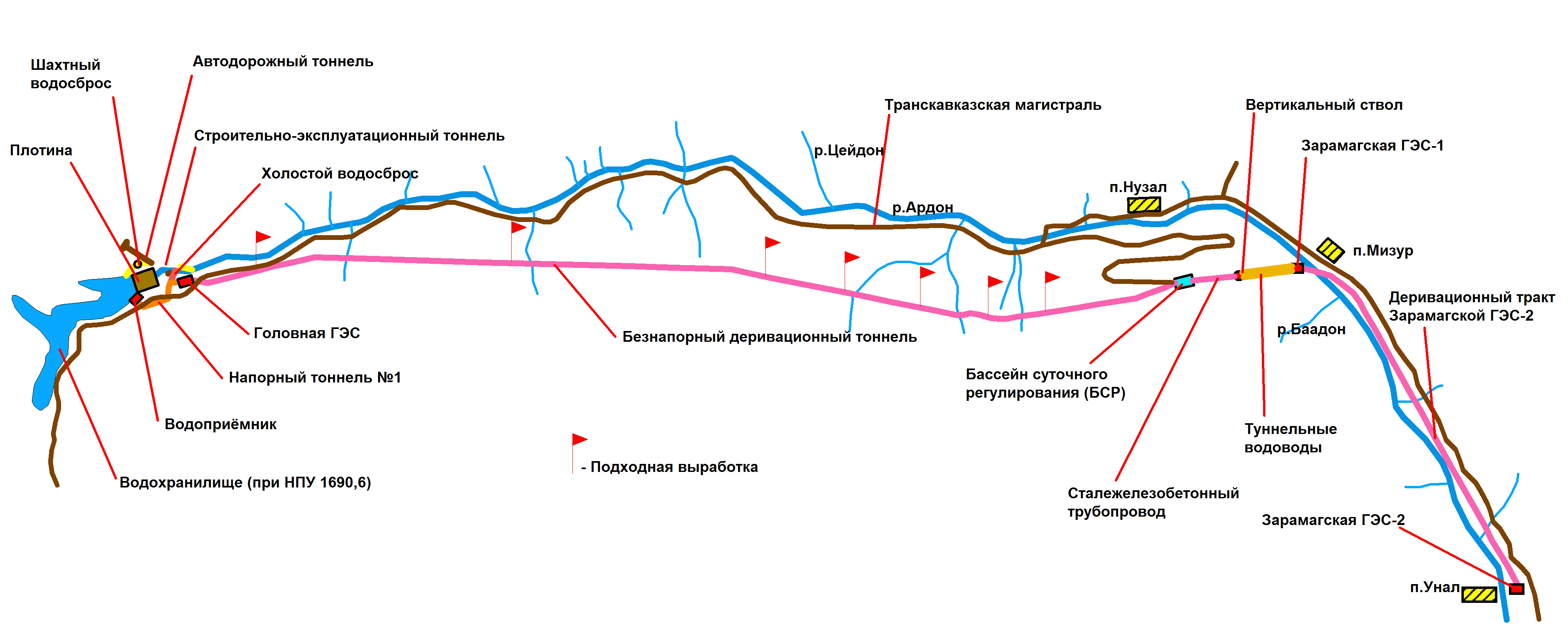
Scheme of Zaramag HPSsLeft south, right north

The facilities of the head node complex ensure the intake of water into the diversion tract of Zaramag HPS-1 from the reservoir formed by the dam. At the same time, the head created by the dam is used for additional power generation at the Head HPS. The head node complex includes a dam, reservoir, construction-operational spillway, intake, pressure tunnel No. 1, Head HPS building (combined with the right-bank spillway), 110 kV substation.

==== Dam ====
The dam is an earth-fill embankment, maximum height 50 m, length 277 m, width at the base 330 m, embankment volume 1.586 million m³. The dam is filled with gravelly-pebble soils and has an impervious core of loamy sandy-rubblly soils. During construction, the original dam project was changed — the dam height was reduced (according to the original project, it was to be 79 m with an embankment volume of 3.726 million m³), the embankment of gravelly soils in the abutment prisms was partially replaced with an embankment of riprap from mountain screes, which significantly increased the dam's reliability. A feature of the dam is the elevated crest elevation relative to the normal backwater level (NBL) of water in the reservoir (1708 m at NBL elevation 1690.6 m; thus, the dam crest is 17.4 m higher than the normal water level in the reservoir), which ensures the dam's safety in case of a large landslide or rockfall into the reservoir. In addition, the dam's design allows for increasing its height in the future if such a decision is made.

==== Spillway ====
The construction-operational spillway is intended for passing river runoff during the construction phase after river diversion, as well as for passing increased river flows during floods in the operation phase of the HPS. It is located on the left bank and consists of an inclined tower with a deep inlet below the reservoir level, closed by flat gates (main and emergency-repair), operated by a cable mechanism. The spillway is designed to pass 190 m³/s of water during a 1% probability flood (reservoir elevation 1692.3 m) and 300 m³/s during a 0.01% probability flood (reservoir elevation 1702.8 m). Water is discharged through a discharge tunnel of circular section with a diameter of 5 m with reinforced concrete lining, length 520 m. The tunnel transitions into a reinforced concrete tray-channel 213 m long and 8 m wide, intended for discharging water into the Ardon River, the banks of which opposite the discharge point are fortified with concrete blocks to prevent erosion. During the construction period, a separate intake was used, now flooded by the reservoir, and the construction tunnel leading to it is plugged with a concrete bulkhead.

==== Head HPS building ====
The pressure-station node of the Head HPS ensures power generation at the Head HPS hydro unit, water supply to the Zaramag HPS-1 diversion, and discharge of excess water through spillway facilities combined with the HPS building. Water is supplied to the Head HPS building through the intake and pressure tunnel No. 1, located on the right bank. The intake is of inclined type, equipped with two trash racks and two repair flat gates. Operation of the racks and gates is carried out using a lifter with a lifting capacity of 55 t. Pressure tunnel No. 1 has a length of 674.29 m, trough-shaped section 7.3×7 m, lining reinforced concrete. The tunnel is equipped with a water outlet with an adjustable segmental gate, thus performing the function of an additional idle spillway. This spillway is planned to be used only during rare strong floods (the Head HPS hydro unit is stopped), the spillway capacity during a 0.01% probability flood (reservoir elevation 1702.8 m) — 385 m³/s. The Head HPS building is of bank type. One vertical hydro unit is installed in the HPS building, equipped with a four-blade adjustable-blade propeller hydraulic turbine PL 70-V-340 with a pre-turbine disc gate. The runner diameter of the hydraulic turbine is 3.5 m, the runner weight is about 30 tons. The turbine drives a hydro generator SV 565/139-30 UHL4, delivering electricity at 10 kV voltage. At the design head of 18.6 m, the hydro unit develops a power of 15 mW. A feature of the hydro unit is the possibility of significantly increasing its power (up to 33 mW) if a decision is made to increase the dam height; in this case, the runner design provides for its reconstruction by increasing the number of blades from 4 to 8. The hydraulic turbine manufacturer is the Syzyran enterprise "Tyazhmash", the hydro generator — the Novosibirsk plant "Elsib". The water that has worked on the hydro unit is either discharged into the tailrace and then into the Ardon River bed (during the operation period of the Head HPS before the commissioning of Zaramag HPS-1), or supplied to the diversion tract of Zaramag HPS-1. It is also possible to supply water to the Zaramag HPS-1 diversion bypassing the Head HPS, for which the station design provides a block of conical gates that isolate the hydro unit. Electricity from the hydro unit is supplied to an open switchyard (OSY) at 110 kV voltage; one transformer TD 40000/110U1 with a capacity of 40 mVA is installed at the OSY, manufacturer — "Tolyatti Transformer". Power delivery to the power system is carried out via two 110 kV transmission lines to the "Nuzal" and "Zaramag" substations.

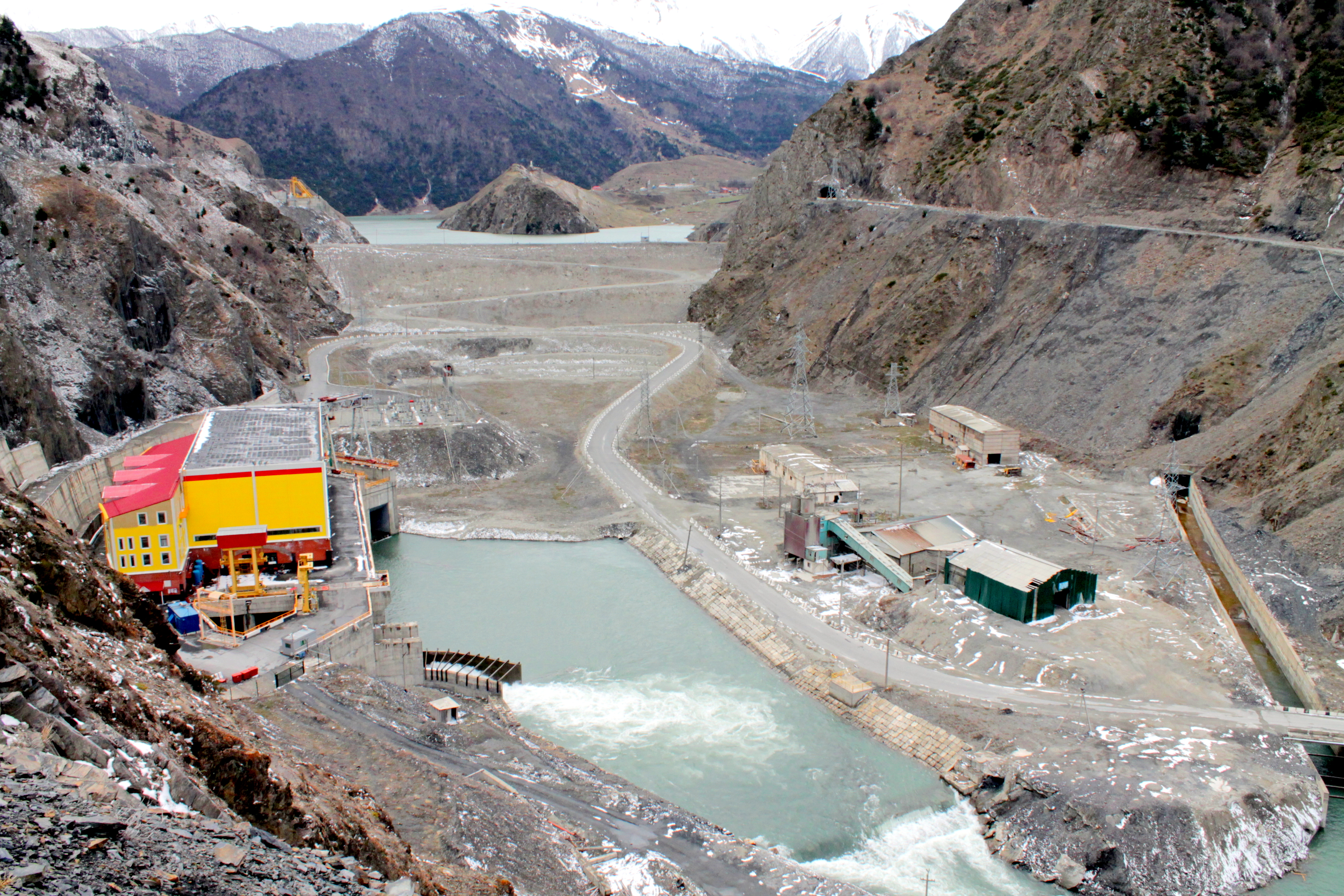
Panorama of the head node of Zaramag HPSs

==== Reservoir ====
The HPS dam created a small reservoir on the Ardon River with an area of 0.77 km², full volume 10.1 million m³, useful volume 0.5 million m³, maximum depth 30.6 m. The normal backwater level (NBL) elevation of the reservoir is 1690.6 m, forced backwater level — 1705.5 m, dead storage level (DSL) elevation — 1690 m. The original project envisaged creating a seasonal regulation reservoir (allowing accumulation of water in high-water periods and discharge during low water) with NBL elevation 1730 m, area 2.5 km², full volume 0.073 km³, useful volume 0.5 million m³, maximum depth 70 m, which would flood 130 ha of agricultural land. In its current state, the reservoir has minimal useful capacity and can only be used for daily runoff regulation.

Facilities and equipment of the Head HPS

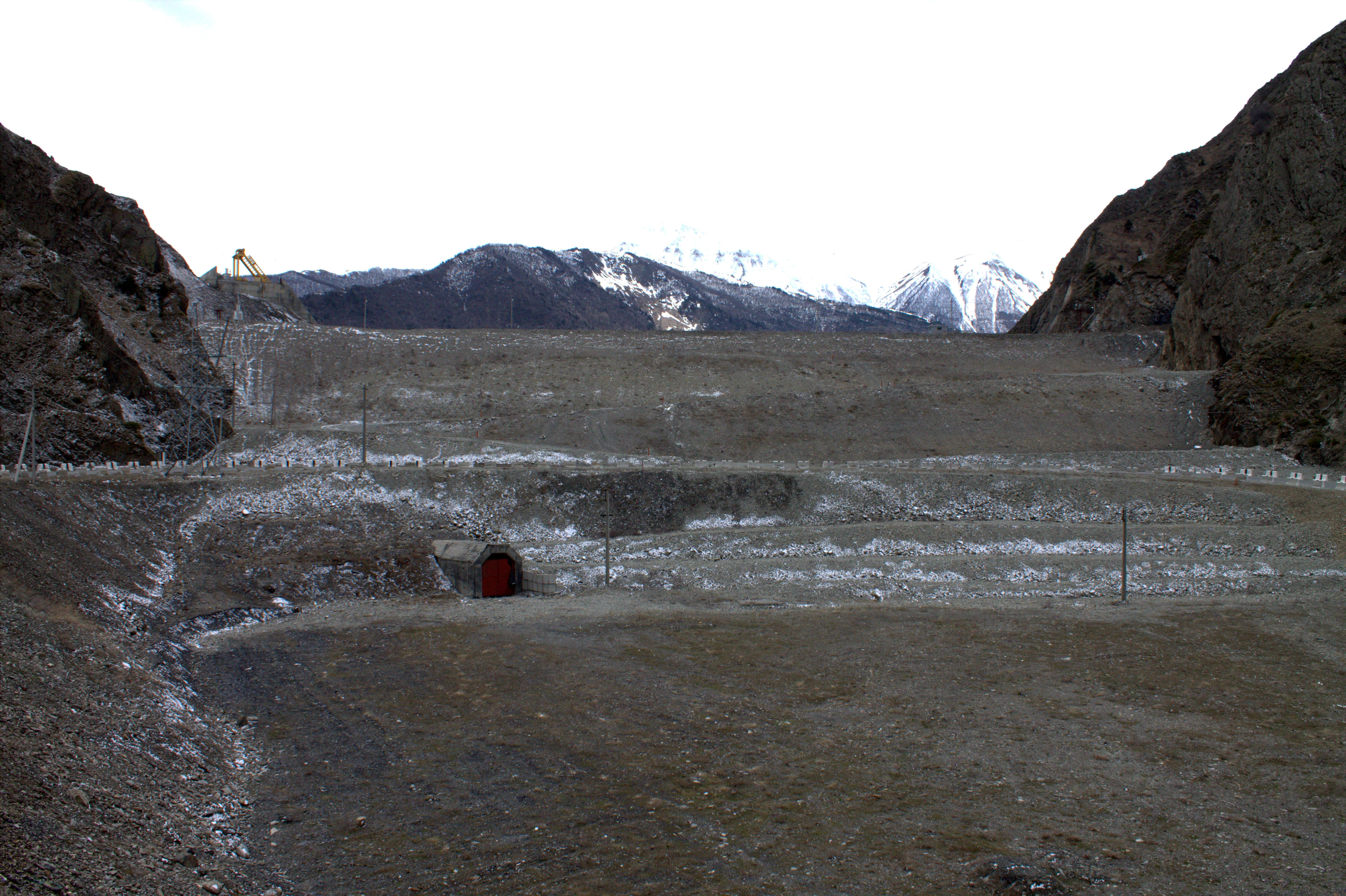
Dam

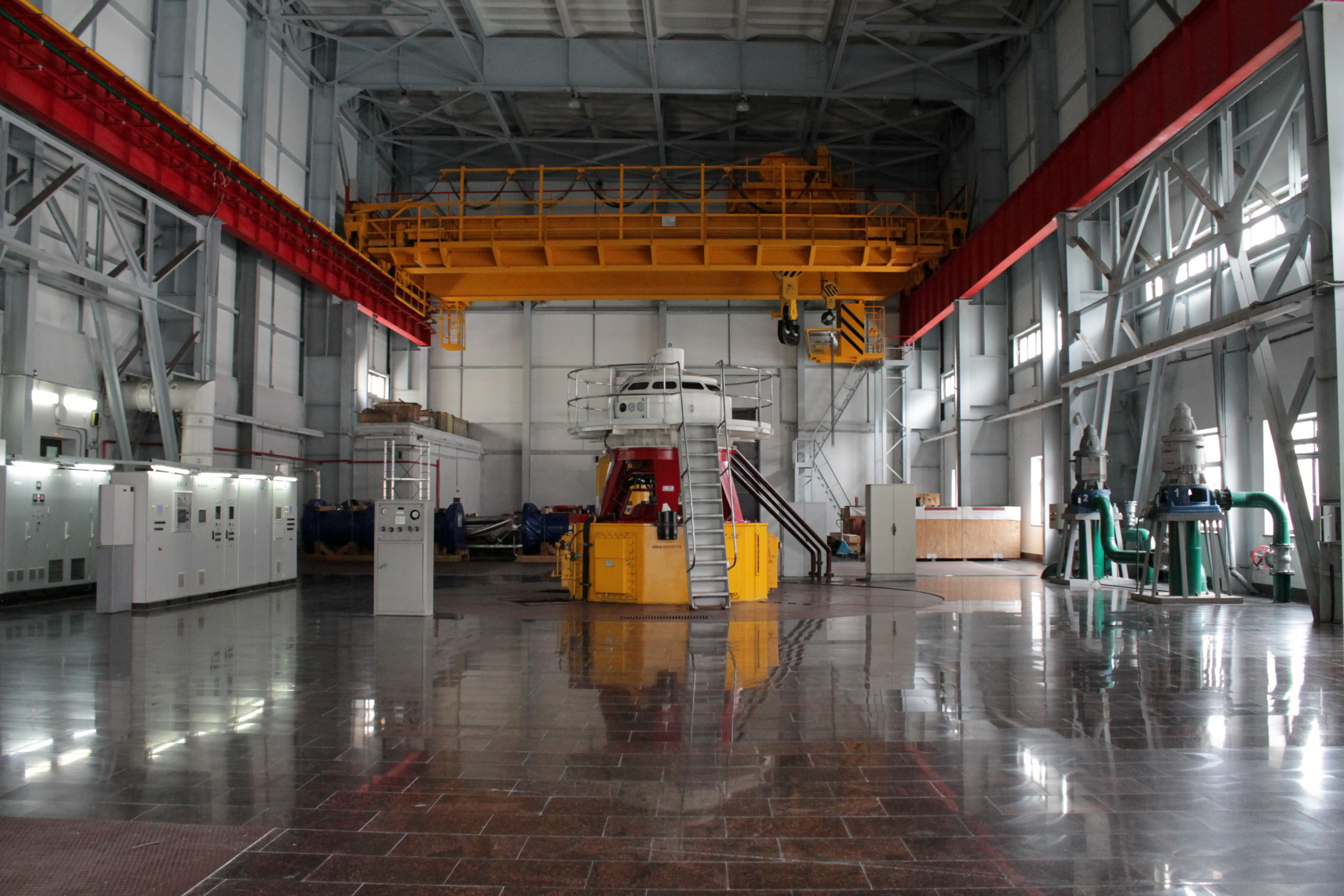
Machine hall

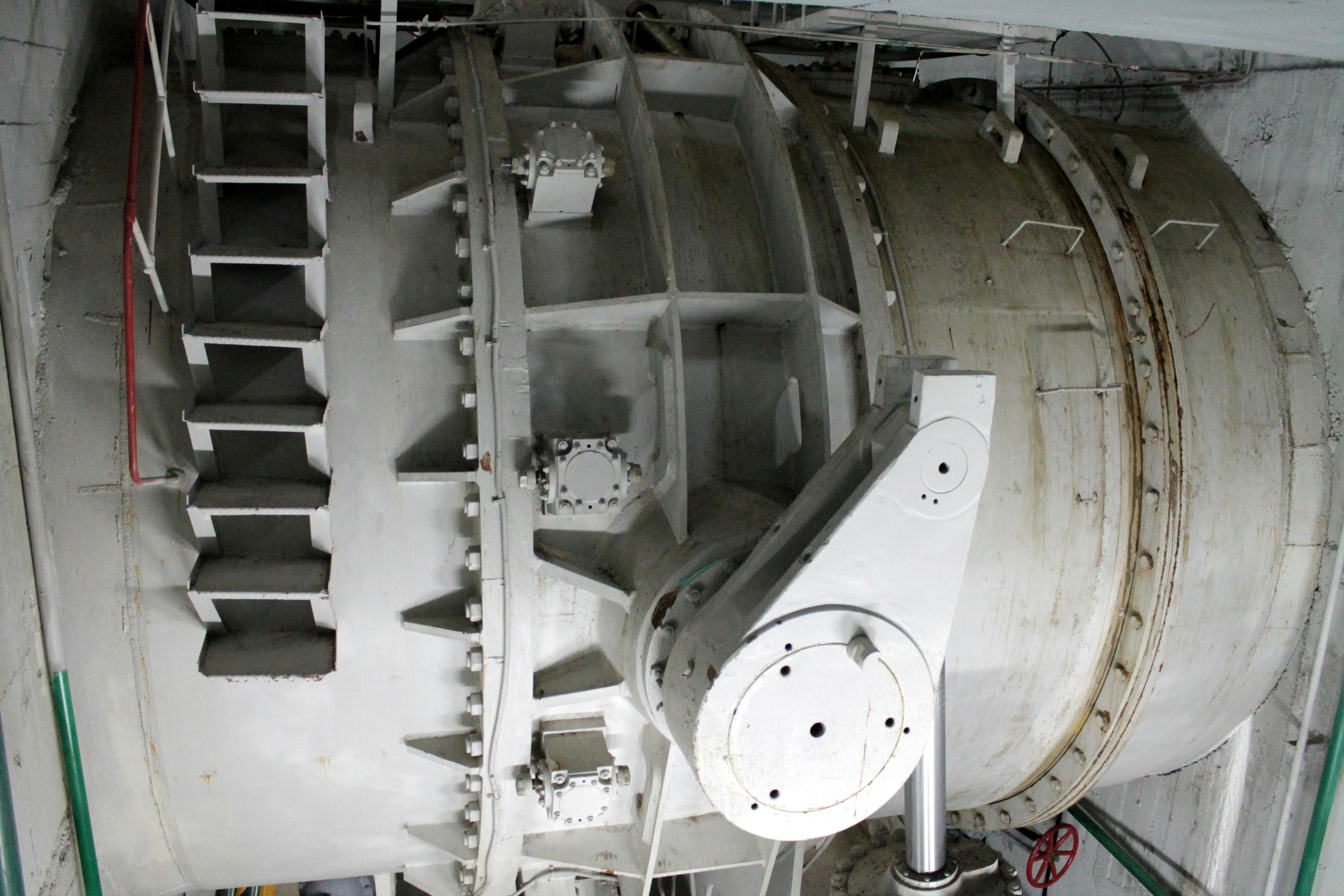
Disc gate

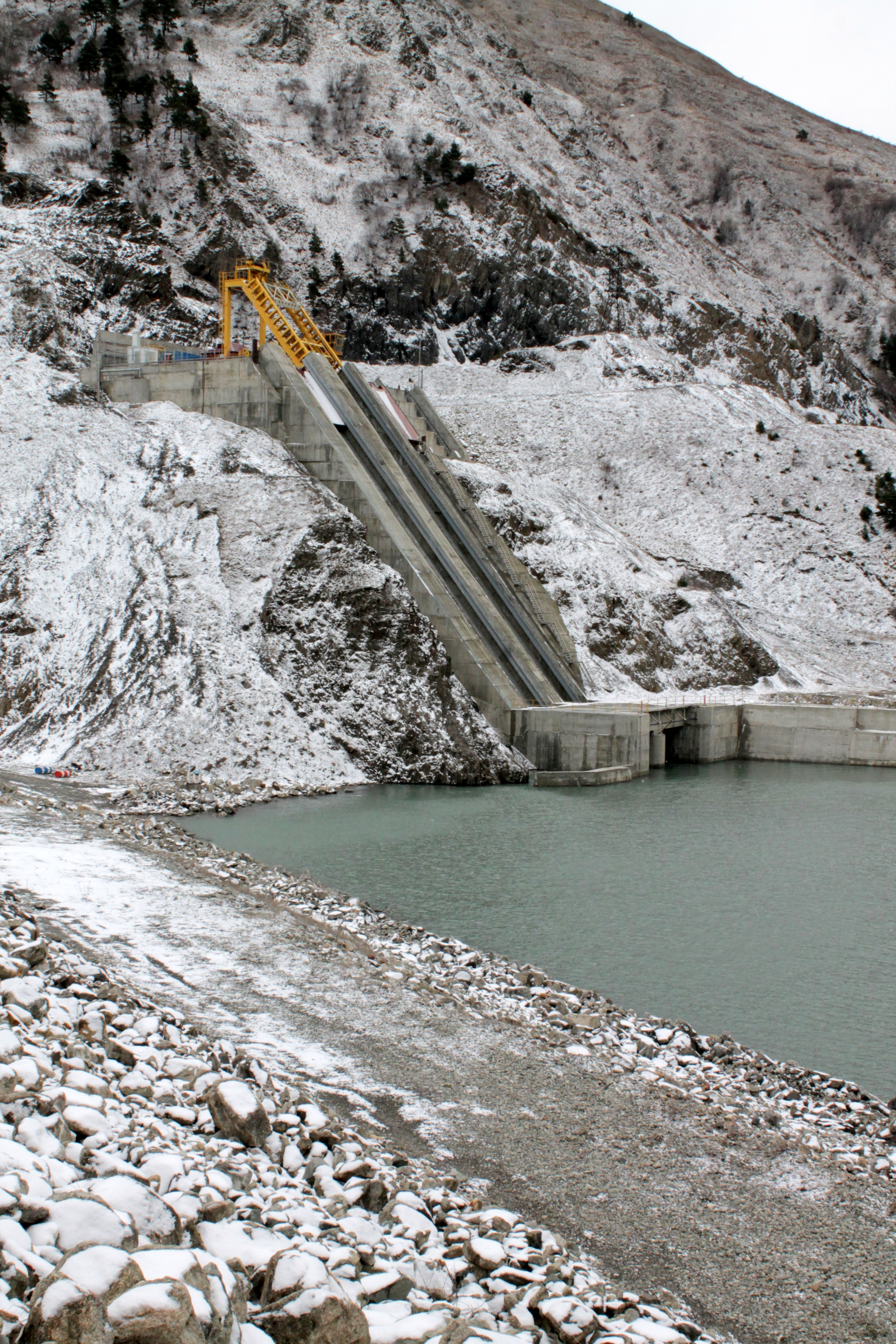
Intake

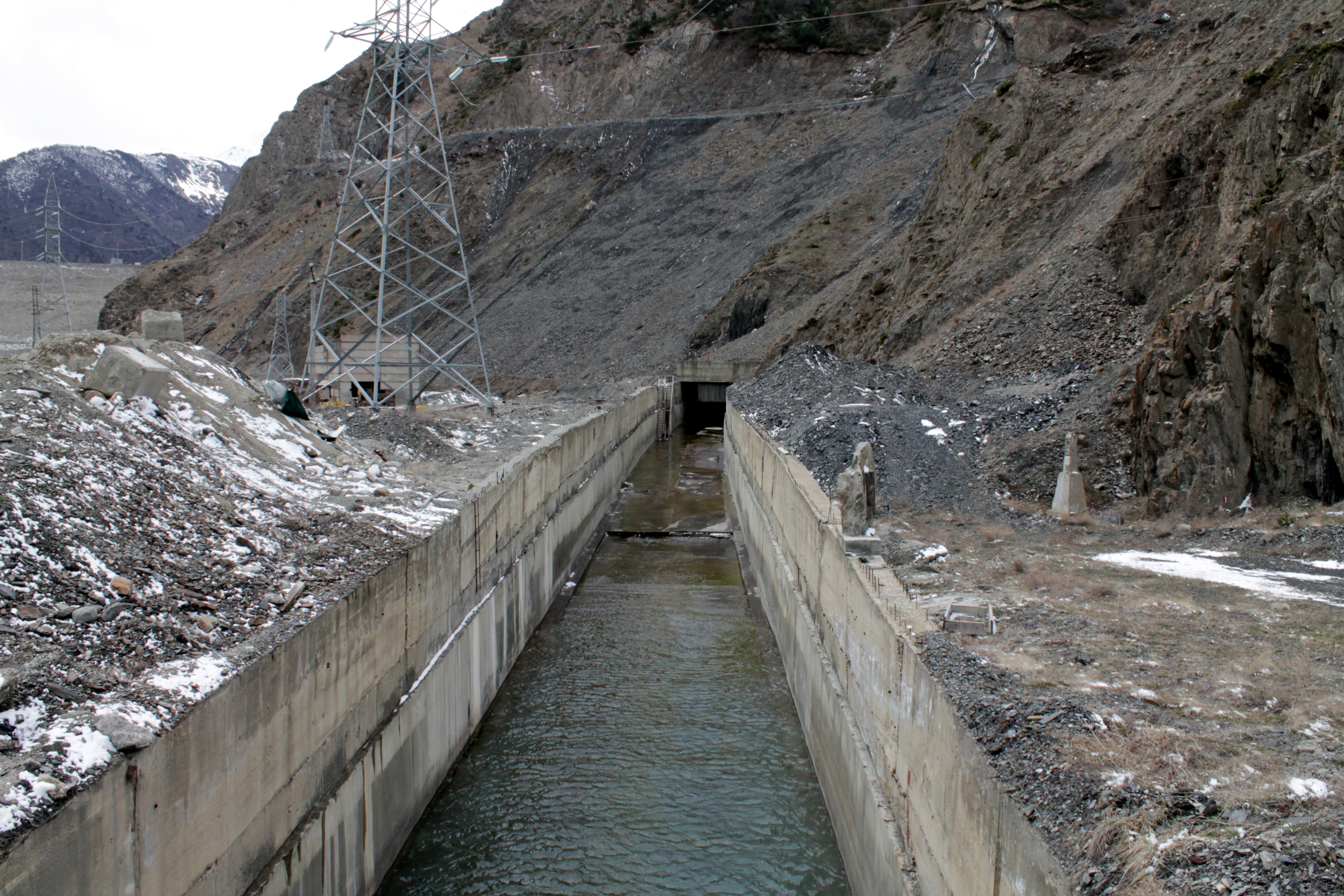
Spillway tray

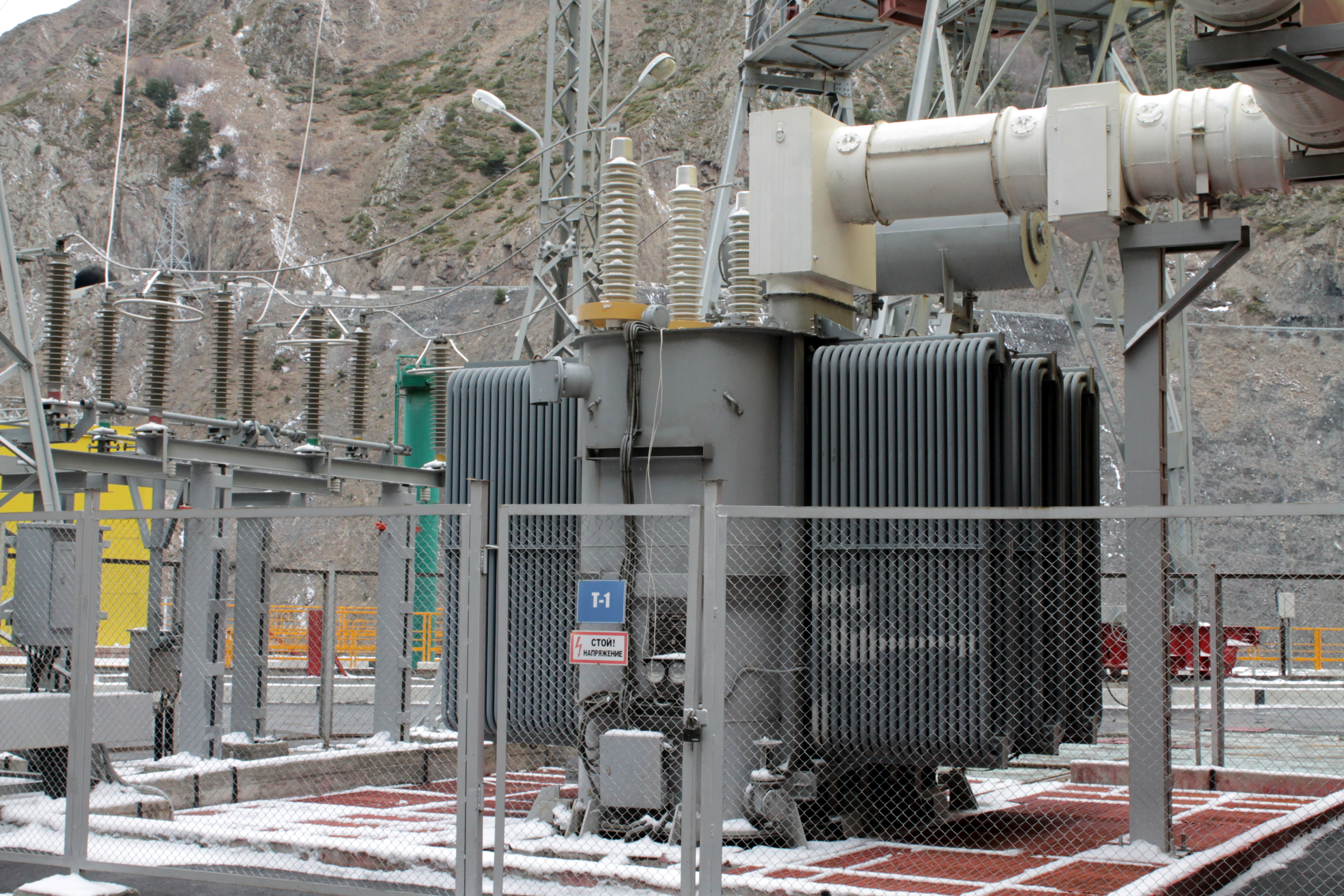
Power transformer

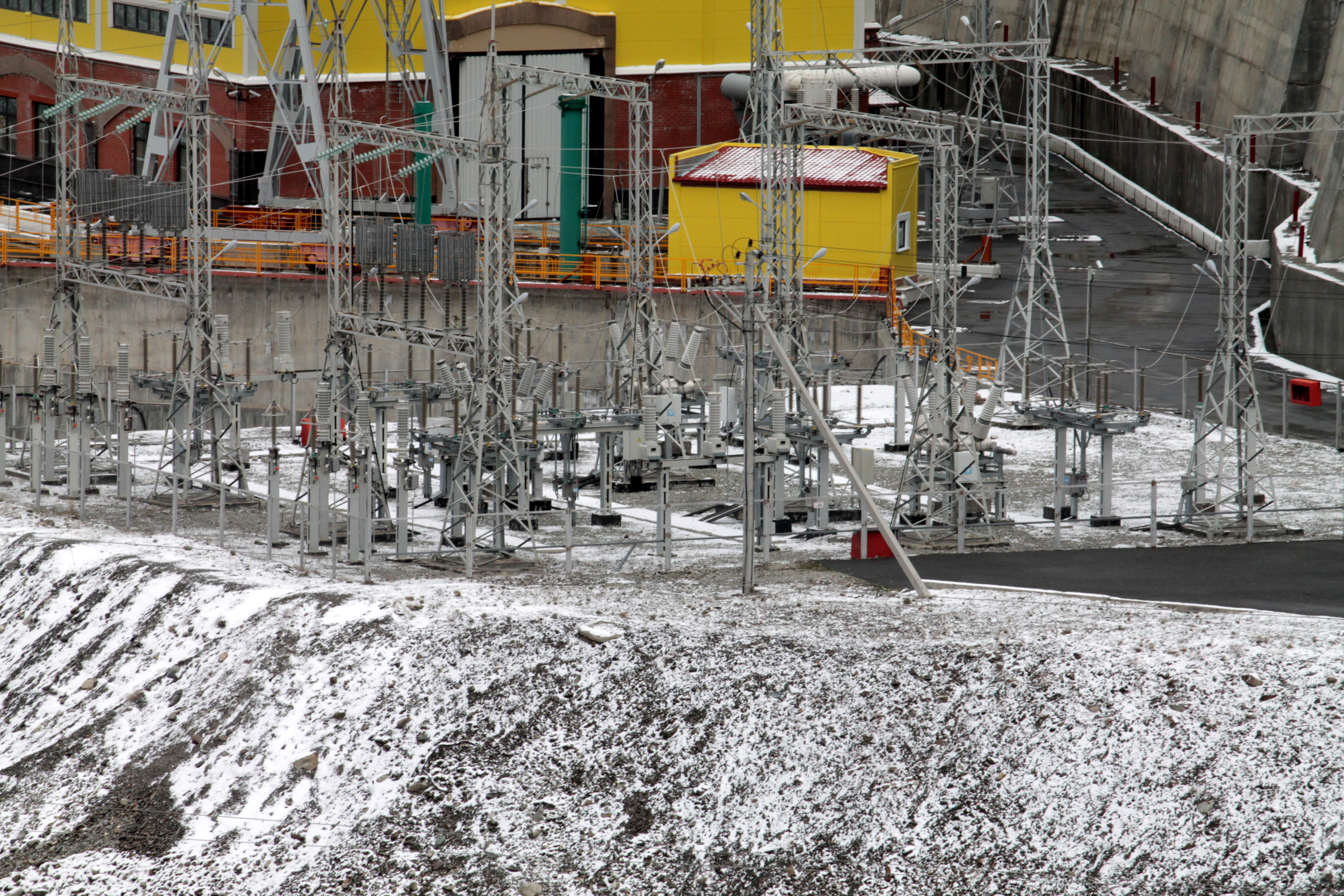
Switchyard

=== Zaramag HPS-1 ===
Zaramag HPS-1 generates the bulk of the electricity for the entire Zaramag HPS complex. This is a complex engineering structure, largely located underground. The Zaramag HPS-1 complex includes diversion tunnel No. 2, pressure-station node (daily regulation basin with idle spillway, intake, steel-reinforced concrete pipeline, vertical shaft, sub-horizontal water conduits), HPS building, 330 kV SF_{6} switchgear.

==== Diversion tunnel ====
The non-pressure diversion tunnel No. 2 is intended for supplying water to the HPS pressure-station node, starts at the Head HPS building and ends at the daily regulation basin, connecting to it via a multi-stage drop. The tunnel length is 14,262 m (a record for Russian hydrotechnical tunnels), trough-shaped section 4.5×4 m, reinforced concrete lining (depending on conditions, several types of lining are used). The tunnel capacity is 65 m³/sec, water must pass the entire tunnel route in 80 minutes. The tunnel route crosses diverse intrusive, metamorphosed, and sedimentary rocks that have undergone both folded and tectonic disturbances.

==== Pressure-station node ====
42°49′47.2″N 44°2′19.9″E The pressure-station node facilities consist of a daily regulation basin, intake, steel-reinforced concrete turbine conduit, vertical shaft, and sub-horizontal water conduits. The daily regulation basin (DRB) is intended for accumulating water before supplying it to the HPS turbines. It is a pentagonal concrete bowl located on the top of a mountain. The maximum length of the DRB is 235 m, maximum width — 80 m. The DRB is formed by massive walls of the gravity dam type with a maximum height of 21.6 m, at the base of which there is a gallery for discharging filtration flows and placing control and measurement equipment. The bottom of the DRB is covered with a multi-layer waterproof coating. The DRB is equipped with an automatic shaft-type idle spillway with a capacity of 65 m³/sec, discharging excess water into the Baddon River; the spillway is activated when the forced backwater level (FBL) is exceeded. The spillway consists of a shaft spillway with a ring overflow, discharge tunnel, stilling basin with stilling pool, labyrinth overflow, and tray-jump. The normal backwater level elevation of water in the DRB is 1635.58 m, forced backwater level — 1641.8 m, dead storage level — 1626.82 m, useful capacity — 144 thousand m³, reserve capacity (between NBL and FBL elevations) — 110 thousand m³. The intake is intended for supplying water from the DRB to the conduit and then to the HPS turbines. It is equipped with a trash rack, as well as flat repair and emergency-repair gates, operated by a cable mechanism with a lifting capacity of 125 t and a bridge crane with a lifting capacity of 50 t. The steel-reinforced concrete turbine conduit has an internal diameter of 4.4 m and length 581 m, buried in soil to protect the concrete shell from external influences, transitions into a vertical shaft (reinforced concrete lining with metal cladding) with a diameter of 3.6 m and depth of 507 m. In the lower part of the shaft, there is a fork into two sub-horizontal tunnel water conduits with diameters of 2.6 m, lengths 895 m and 911 m respectively.

==== Zaramag HPS-1 building ====
The HPP building is above-ground, of bank type. Two vertical hydro units with Pelton hydraulic turbines K-600-V6-341.2 are installed in the building (according to the original project, K-461-V-332 turbines were planned, then K-600-V6-334.5), operating at a design head of 609 m. The runner diameter of the turbine is 3.345 m, nominal rotation speed — 300 rpm. The HPP turbines operate at a record head for Russian HPPs, and the HPP turbines are also the largest Pelton turbines at Russian HPPs and among the largest in the world. The hydraulic turbines drive two hydro generators SV 685/243-20 with a capacity of 173 MW each. The hydraulic turbine manufacturer is the German company Voith Hydro, the hydro generators — Novosibirsk NPO "Elsib". To ensure the possibility of quick shutoff of water supply to the turbines, the HPP building is equipped with pre-turbine ball gates with a diameter of 2 m, manufactured by the "Turboatom" plant. For assembly/disassembly of hydro units in the machine hall, a bridge crane with a lifting capacity of 500 t is installed. The water that has worked on the turbines is discharged through the tailrace into the Ardon bed, while the channel design provides for its connection to the diversion of the prospective Zaramag HPP-2. Power delivery from the generators is carried out at 15.75 kV voltage to two power transformers TDC-230000/330-U1 with a capacity of 230 MVA each, and from them — to the gas-insulated switchgear (GIS) at 330 kV voltage. Power delivery to the power system is carried out via two 330 kV transmission lines 30 km long each to the "330 kV Nalchik" and "330 kV Vladikavkaz-2" substations.

Facilities and equipment of Zaramag HPS-1

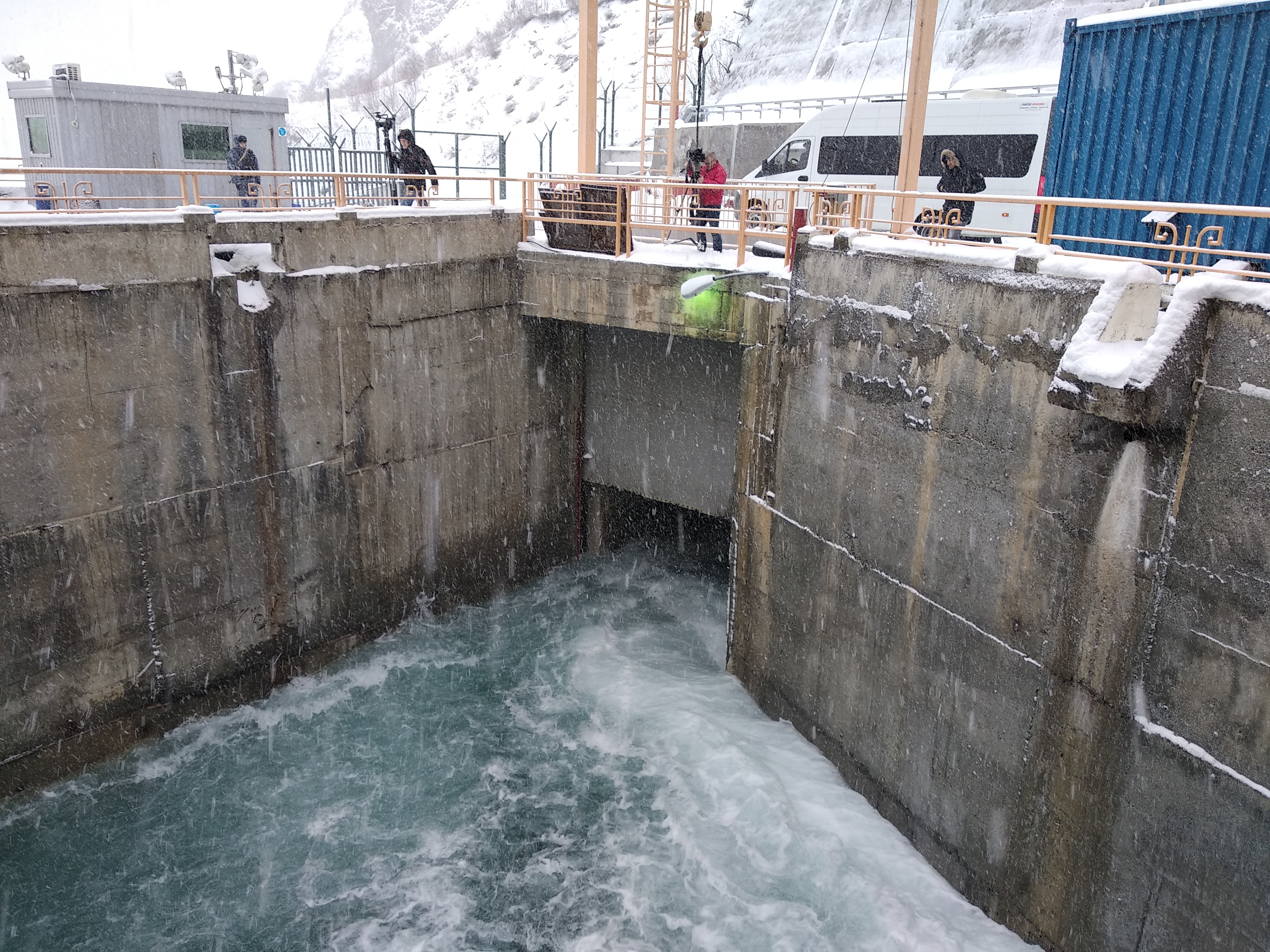
Tunnel inlet portal

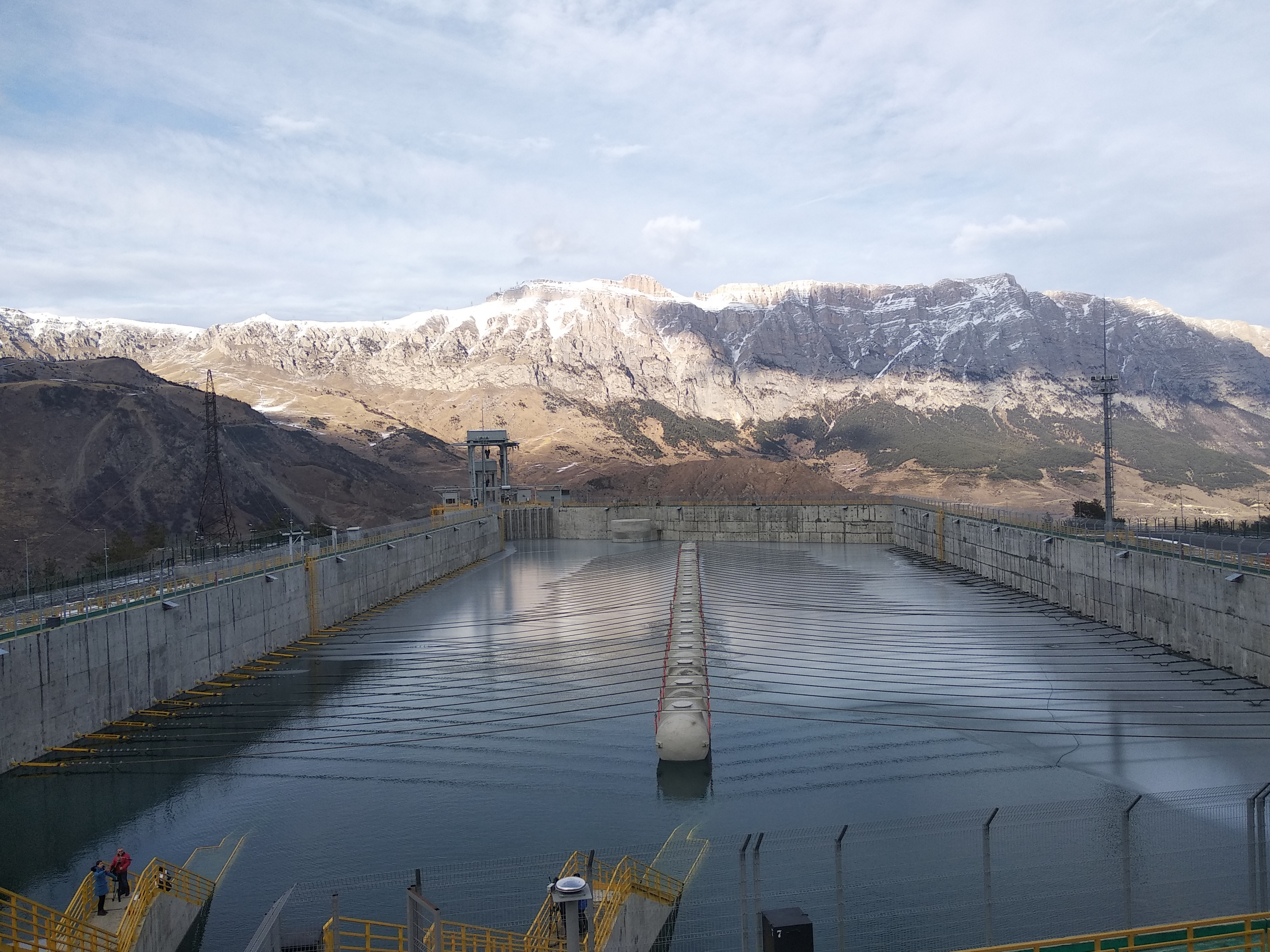
Daily regulation basin

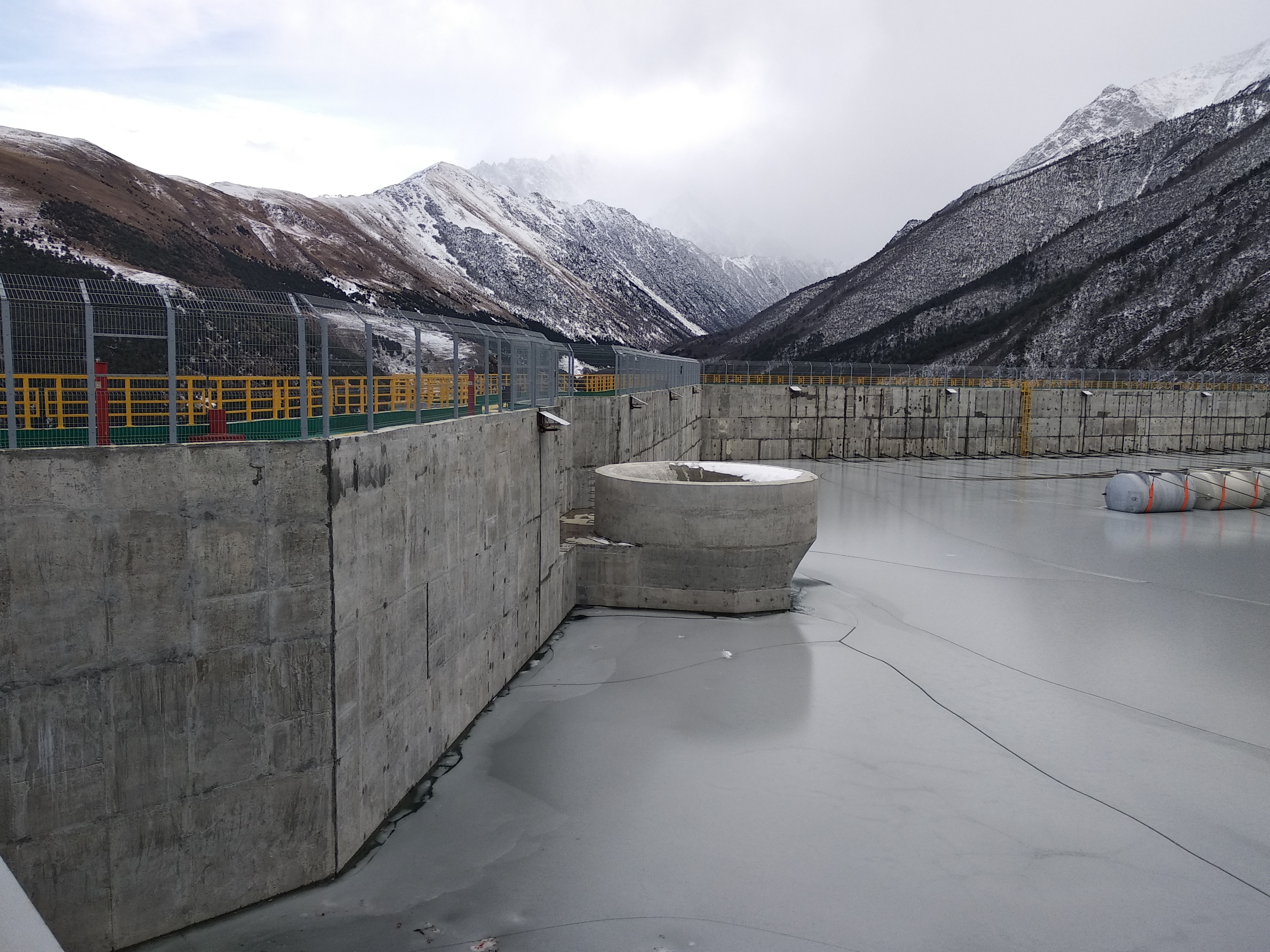
Idle spillway head

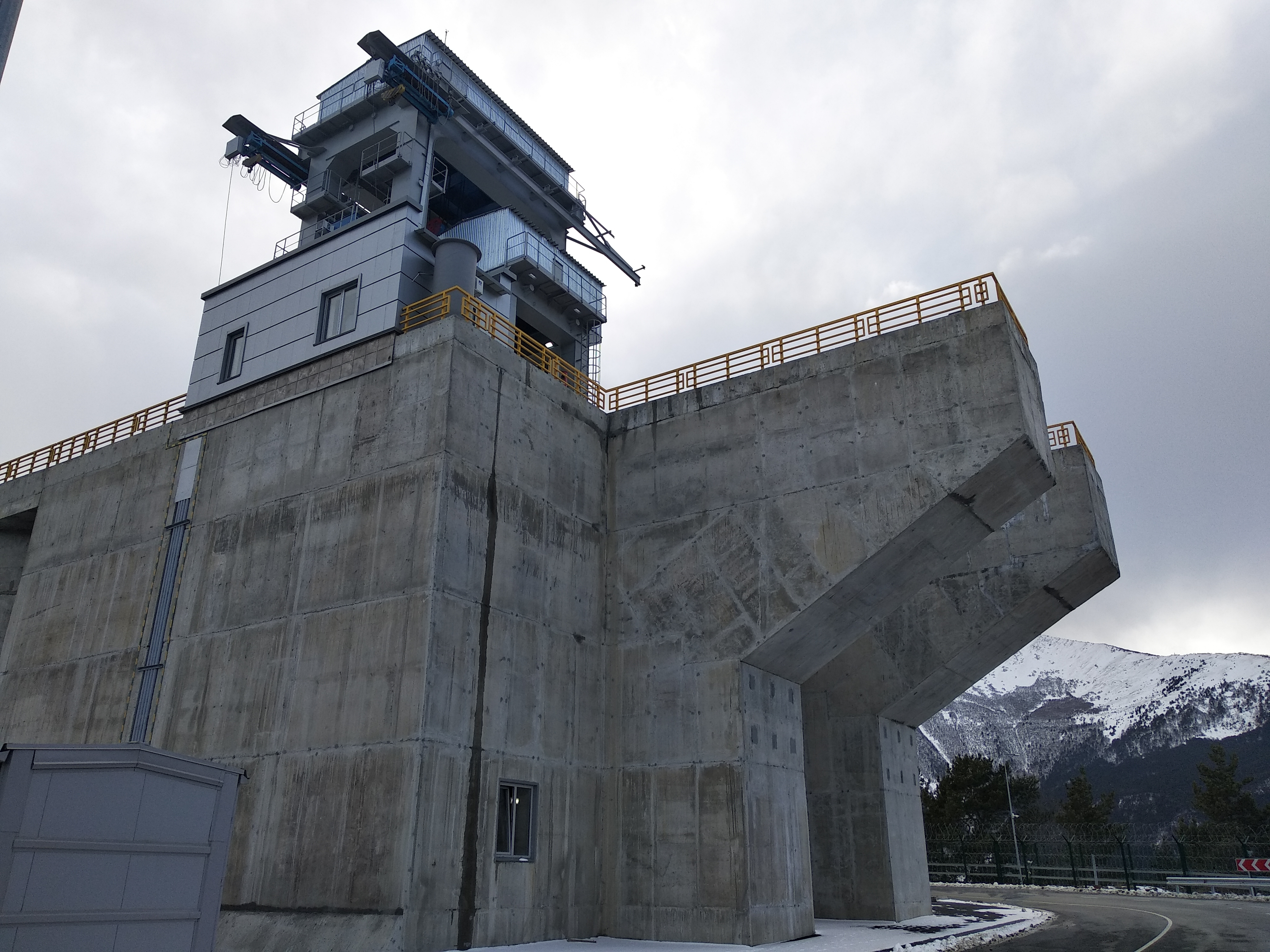
Intake

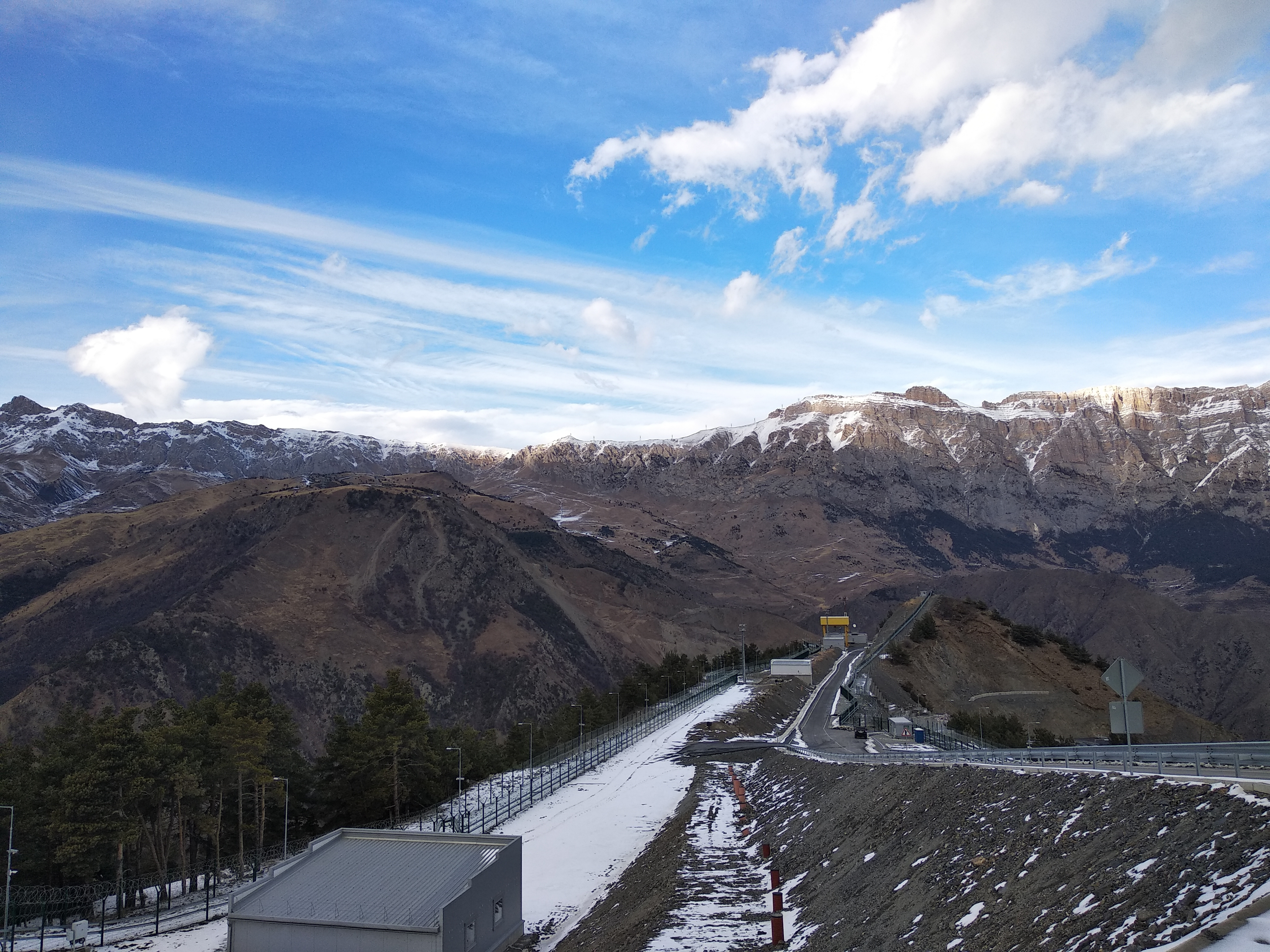
Turbine conduit

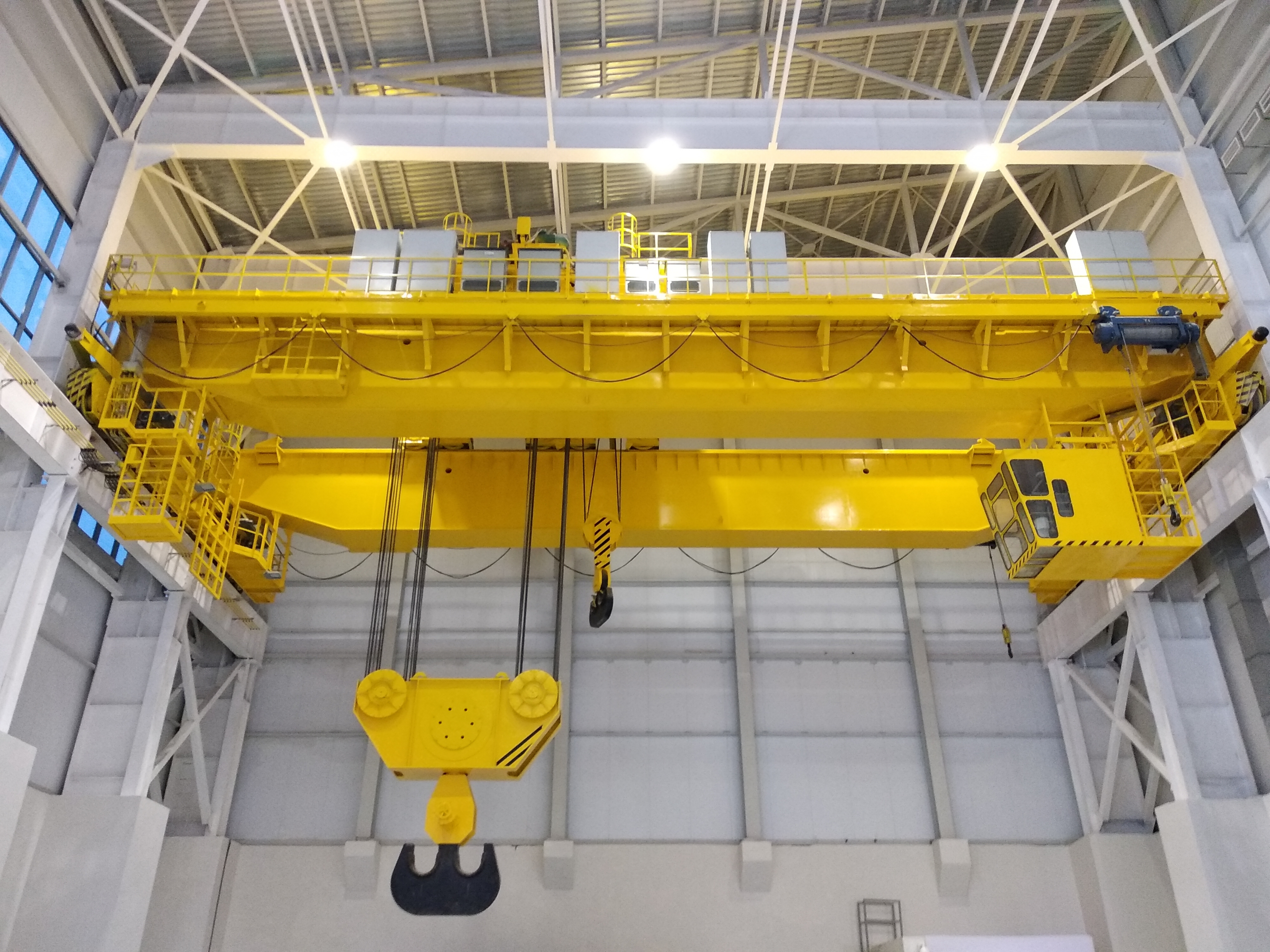
Machine hall bridge crane

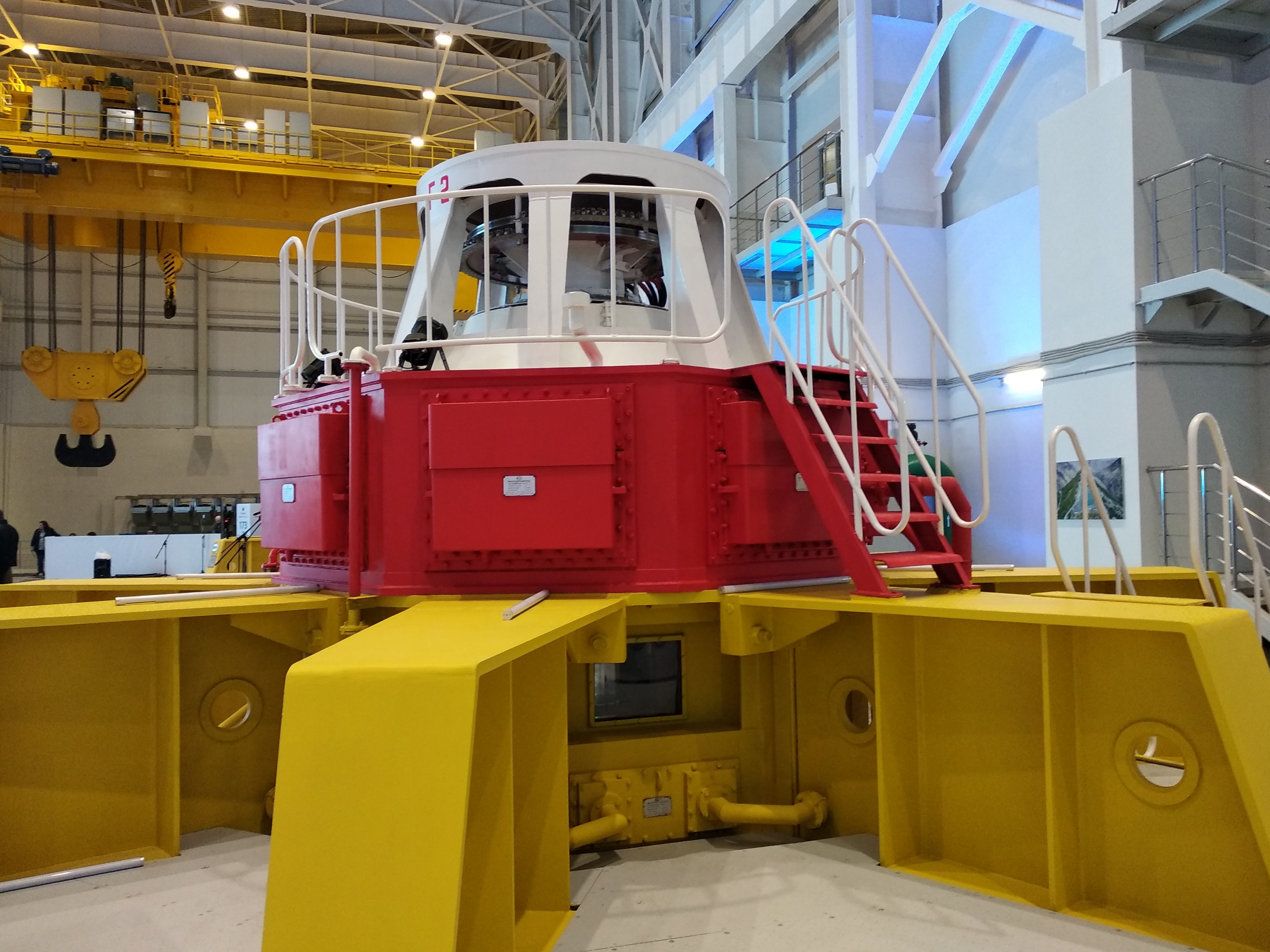
Hydro unit

== Consequences of creating Zaramag HPSs ==
=== Environmental consequences ===
Being a source of renewable energy, the Zaramag HPSs have displaced about 270 thousand tons of conventional fuel from the North Caucasus fuel balance. This has prevented annual emissions into the atmosphere of nitrogen oxides in the amount of 3.5 thousand tons, sulfur oxides — 8.2 thousand tons, ash — 3 thousand tons, carbon dioxide — 420 thousand tons. Due to the small size of the reservoir, its impact on the microclimate is insignificant, traceable only within a radius of 100 meters from the shore. According to studies, the reservoir will not affect the Tibskoye mineral water deposit, as well as the Kudzahta and Narskaya group sources. The Zaramag HPS construction project underwent an environmental impact assessment (EIA) procedure.

=== Criticism ===
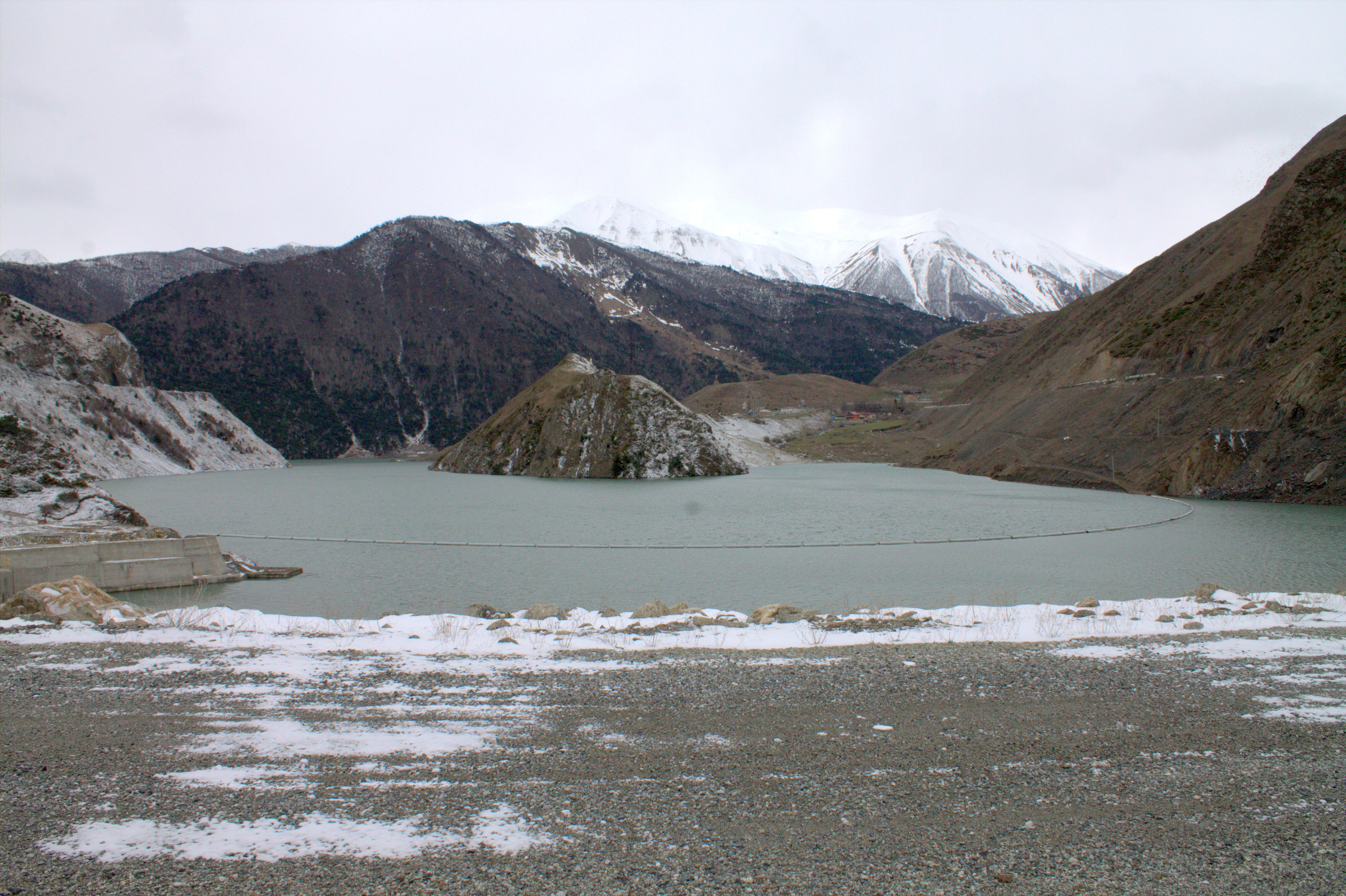
Zaramag reservoir

The construction of the Zaramag HPSs raises concerns among a number of individuals and public organizations. Critics of the project focus on the danger of flooding archaeological sites, the danger of dam destruction, and the Transcaucasian Highway. The territory to be flooded by the reservoir was once very densely populated and is of significant archaeological interest, however, detailed studies in this direction had not previously been conducted in this area. Large-scale archaeological excavations in the flooding zone were carried out in 2006–2008 (in particular, in 2007, four archaeological expeditions worked in the flooding zone, conducting excavations on an area of 8000 m²). The open Aydadon necropolis of the Koban culture was studied in detail, dated to the 14th–6th centuries BCE; numerous ancient burials located in stone tombs in four tiers, as well as a large number of metal objects, were discovered during the excavations. Archaeological excavations were also carried out at the medieval burial ground "Mamison", the multi-layer settlement "Tsmi", and the mesolithic site "Tsmi-2". The HPS reservoir is federal property, and rescue archaeological work should have been financed from the federal budget, but the necessary funds were not allocated, so the excavations were carried out at the expense of funds allocated by "RusHydro" in the amount of 84 million rubles. During the conducted studies, it turned out that the area of the studied objects significantly exceeds that included in the work estimate; for carrying out the work in full, additional funds were required, which were not planned in the "RusHydro" budget, and it was also not possible to obtain budget financing for these purposes. In connection with this situation, opinions were expressed about the need to postpone the flooding of the reservoir bed or to abandon the completion of the facility altogether. Concerns are expressed about the possible dam breach in case of an earthquake or a large landslide with catastrophic consequences for the downstream settlements, as well as undercutting of the Transcaucasian Highway by the reservoir with its destruction, which would lead to transport isolation of South Ossetia. Specialists from scientific and design organizations note the large safety margin for seismic resistance adopted in the project for the dam (11.25 points at the area's seismicity of 9 points), the placement of the dam on a single rock block (the nearest tectonic fault is located 1 km from the dam alignment). The project provides for a number of anti-landslide measures, in particular, the construction of a bypass tunnel 1160 m long and 5 m in diameter in case of the Dallagau landslide and its blocking of the mamison River bed, as well as a significant margin of the dam crest height above the reservoir level. No significant impact of the reservoir on the Transcaucasian Highway is expected in the design materials; if specially organized monitoring detects any negative processes, the development of engineering protection measures for the road is provided.

== Construction history ==
=== Design ===
North Ossetia is an energy-deficient region; before the commissioning of the Zaramag HPSs, the republic's own energy sources provided only 16% of the republic's energy consumption. At the same time, the republic's rivers have significant energy potential, amounting to about 5.2 billion kWh. The hydro power potential of the republic's rivers was used by several small and medium hydroelectric power stations, commissioned mainly in the 1930s–1950s — Ezmin, Gizeldon, Dzaudzhikau, and several small HPSs with a total capacity of 81.11 mW; the operating HPSs used no more than 7% of the economically efficient hydro power potential of the republic's rivers. Hydro power resources are represented by the Terek River and its tributaries flowing from the Greater Caucasus Range, of which the most significant is the Ardon River. The most favorable section for HPS construction on this river is the Kassar Gorge section, where over 16 kilometers the river has a drop of about 700 meters, creating conditions for constructing a powerful diversion HPS in this area. From 1966 to 1968, the "Hydroproject" institute, based on multi-year surveys, developed the "Scheme for the use of water resources of the Ardon River", which was approved by the USSR ministry of Energy in 1968. This scheme provided for creating a cascade of three hydroelectric power stations (Zaramag-1, Zaramag-2, and Unal) with a total capacity of 562 mW and an average annual electricity generation of 1409 million kWh on the section from Nizhny Zaramag to Tamisk. In the future, the parameters of individual HPSs in the cascade were repeatedly clarified, and their number increased — an additional cascade stage appeared, the Head HPS with a capacity of 35 mW. The design of Zaramag HPS was carried out taking into account the large-scale program of constructing low-maneuverable nuclear power plants that existed at that time, so the HPS was designed as peaking, i.e., intended for operation in the peaking part of the load schedule. The technical-economic justification for the construction of Zaramag HPSs was developed by the Armenian branch of the "Hydroproject" institute from 1973 to 1974 and approved by the scientific-technical council of the USSR ministry of Energy in 1975. The technical project of Zaramag HPSs was approved by order of the USSR ministry of Energy No. 81-PS dated July 5, 1978; by decree of the USSR Council of ministers No. 1268r dated June 5, 1979, Zaramag HPSs were included in the title list of newly started production facilities in 1979. The original project was repeatedly revised for various reasons — due to tightening of environmental requirements, revision of the construction area's seismicity, detection of previously unaccounted geological features, emergence of new technologies, etc. In 1991, for environmental reasons, the dam height was reduced to 15 m, but in this form, the project was rejected by the minTopEnergo Russia expertise due to rapid silting of the reservoir and HPS inoperability due to sediment entering the diversion. In 1993, the technical project was reworked and re-approved; the main change compared to the original project was the reduction of the reservoir NBL elevation by 40 m, which also led to a reduction in the dam height. At the same time, the possibility of development to the original parameters was stipulated, so the spillway and Head HPS intakes were built taking into account the possibility of operation at the original reservoir elevation, the Head HPS turbine and generator also have significant power reserve, and the dam design provides for the possibility of increasing its height. In 1995, the functions of the HPS general designer were transferred to the "Lenhydroproject" institute, which made significant changes to the hydro power complex design. The most significant of them are:

- Change of the upstream cross-wall design to a variant with a screen;
- Change of the Head HPS building configuration to place it entirely on a rock foundation;
- Change of the construction-operational spillway intake design;
- Changes to the dam design ensuring higher reliability;
- Reduction of tunnel No. 1 length, introduction of idle water outlet from the tunnel;
- Complete redesign of the daily regulation basin with significant increase in its seismic resistance;
- Complete redesign of the DRB idle spillway;
- Change of the sub-horizontal conduit design — introduction of a second conduit;
- Complete redesign of the Zaramag HPS-1 building;
- Change of the HPS-1 power delivery scheme (transition to 330 kV voltage instead of 110 kV), replacement of the open switchyard with GIS.

Such large-scale changes led to the need for another re-approval of the project by the Glavgosexpertiza, which occurred in 2013.

=== Construction ===
Preparatory work for the construction of Zaramag HPSs began in June 1976 by the forces of ChirkeyGESstroy, from 1979 the construction of main facilities began, from 1982 — the driving of the diversion tunnel. From the very beginning of the work, construction faced problems with financing, material-technical supply, organization of work; in addition, at the end of the 1980s, the project began to be actively criticized by environmental organizations. The driving of the unique-length diversion tunnel faced significant difficulties — initially it was planned as pressure, to be built in a short time using a tunnel boring complex. However, the domestic tunnel boring complex turned out to be unfinished and unsuitable for use, which led to the need to return to the traditional slow drill-and-blast method of driving with increased tunnel dimensions and conversion to non-pressure mode, which in turn required the introduction of a DRB into the design. As a result, in 1989, the construction and installation department for the construction of Zaramag HPSs was liquidated due to systematic failure to meet planned deadlines, HPS construction was suspended, and project revision began. Nevertheless, by 1990, about 3500 m of the diversion and most of the construction tunnels had been driven, and the daily regulation basin pit had been opened. Construction of the station was suspended from 1990 to 1994. In 1993, a new technical project of the HPS was approved, including a reduction of the dam height by 40 meters, which reduced the flooding area but deprived the reservoir of regulating capacity and reduced the Head HPS capacity to 10 mW (from 32 mW). In 1994, the RAO "UES of Russia" management took a number of organizational measures to streamline the construction management process, but until 2001, due to small funding volumes, the work pace was very low; the most notable event in construction was the completion of the construction spillway and river diversion in December 1998. In April 1999, a RAO "UES of Russia" meeting was held under the leadership of A. B. Chubais with the participation of the republic's North Ossetia leaders, representatives of the general designer, and contractors. Following the meeting, it was decided to create OJSC "Zaramag HPSs" (registered on may 5, 2000), construction financing was somewhat increased, but the allocated funds (about 200 million rubles per year) were clearly insufficient, enough mainly to maintain the already built facilities. From 2001, financing was somewhat increased (though in an insufficient volume for full-scale deployment of work), which allowed activating construction work. The concept of advance construction of the Head HPS was developed, so the main work was concentrated on the head node facilities. At the same time, work on the construction of Zaramag HPS-1 continued; in particular, in 2003, the driving of the vertical shaft was completed. During the Russian electric power reform in 2004, OJSC "HydroOGK" was created (later renamed OJSC "RusHydro"), which included most of the country's hydroelectric power stations, both operating and under construction; in January 2005, OJSC "Zaramag HPSs" also joined it and became a subsidiary of the company (as of 2014, "RusHydro" owned 99.75% of OJSC "Zaramag HPSs" shares). From 2007, construction financing was significantly increased. By this time, the Head HPS launch complex was in a relatively high degree of readiness, the readiness of Zaramag HPS-1 facilities was significantly lower — in particular, by early 2007, only 6397 m (about 45%) of diversion tunnel No. 2 had been driven, the construction of which determined the HPS commissioning dates. Of the pressure-station node facilities, by the early 2000s, the driving of the vertical shaft had been completed. As for the HPS-1 building, at that time, only part of the pit had been developed for it.

Financing of Zaramag HPSs construction in 2003–2014, million rubles
2003	2004	2005	2006	2007	2008	2009	2010	2011	2012	2013	2014
288.4	171.4	311.2	957.9	2143.1	1812.5	2880.6	3619.7	1687.4	2426.4	2188.7	2534.0

In 2007, tenders were announced for the supply of hydro power equipment (turbines and generators) for Zaramag HPS-1, the winners of which were Voith Siemens Hydro and OJSC "Elsib". By the end of the year, the dam embankment of the Head HPS was generally completed, and the faces No. 7 and 8 of diversion tunnel No. 2 were connected. On February 19, 2008, a powerful avalanche of 100 thousand m³ descended on the Zaramag HPS construction site. Three people died, some construction infrastructure facilities were destroyed. During the year, work on the dam was completed, an act of readiness of the reservoir bed for flooding was signed, construction of the intake and pressure tunnel No. 1 was completed, 855 m of diversion tunnel No. 2 was driven. Due to delays in equipment delivery, as well as temporary suspension of construction work due to snow avalanches and the armed conflict in South Ossetia, the Head HPS commissioning was postponed to 2009. As of January 1, 2009, the readiness of Zaramag HPS facilities was estimated at 51%, and on January 14, the construction spillway was closed and reservoir filling began (by June 10, 2009, it was filled to the design elevation). On February 9 of the same year, the hydraulic turbine runner wheel of the Head HPS was delivered to the HPS construction site, on July 5, the station's power delivery facilities were energized. The hydro unit of the Head HPS was started on idle run on July 7, and on September 18, 2009, the official commissioning of the Head HPS took place with the participation of Russian Prime minister Vladimir Putin. During 2009, 638 m of the diversion tunnel was driven, the driving of sub-horizontal water conduits was completed, large-scale earthworks were resumed at the daily regulation basin. During 2010, the construction-operational spillway of the Head HPS was completed, including repair of the construction tunnel operated since 1999. Contracts were concluded for the supply of ball gates for Zaramag HPS-1, construction of the steel-reinforced concrete conduit (contractor — "Trest Gidromontazh"), and daily regulation basin (contractor — "ChirkeyGESstroy"). 1139 m of the diversion tunnel was driven, active earthworks continued at the DRB. In 2011, construction of the steel-reinforced concrete conduit was deployed, earth and concrete works at the daily regulation basin were mostly completed. The section of the diversion tunnel between faces No. 3 and 4 was connected, the only undriven section was the most difficult section between faces No. 5 and 6 about 4.5 km long. By early 2012, about 11 km (out of 14.2 km) of diversion tunnel No. 2 length had been driven. During the year, concrete works at the DRB continued, construction of the conduit and driving of the diversion tunnel were carried out, the anchor section was installed in the vertical shaft, and the shaft itself was prepared for metal cladding installation. By mid-2013, 12 km of the diversion tunnel had been driven, installation of sub-horizontal water conduits and shaft cladding began, surface conduit construction was 90% complete. In 2013, due to a deficit of funds in OJSC "RusHydro"'s investment program, a decision was made to suspend construction. In 2013, the adjusted design documentation received a positive conclusion from the Glavgosexpertiza, as well as an independent expertise performed by Tractebel Engineering. In 2013–2014, to ensure the reliability of previously built facilities, work continued in the diversion tunnel (driving and lining), surface and sub-horizontal conduits; the lower knee was installed and concreted in the vertical shaft, concrete works continued at the daily regulation basin.

Construction of Zaramag HPS-1 (as of April 2013)

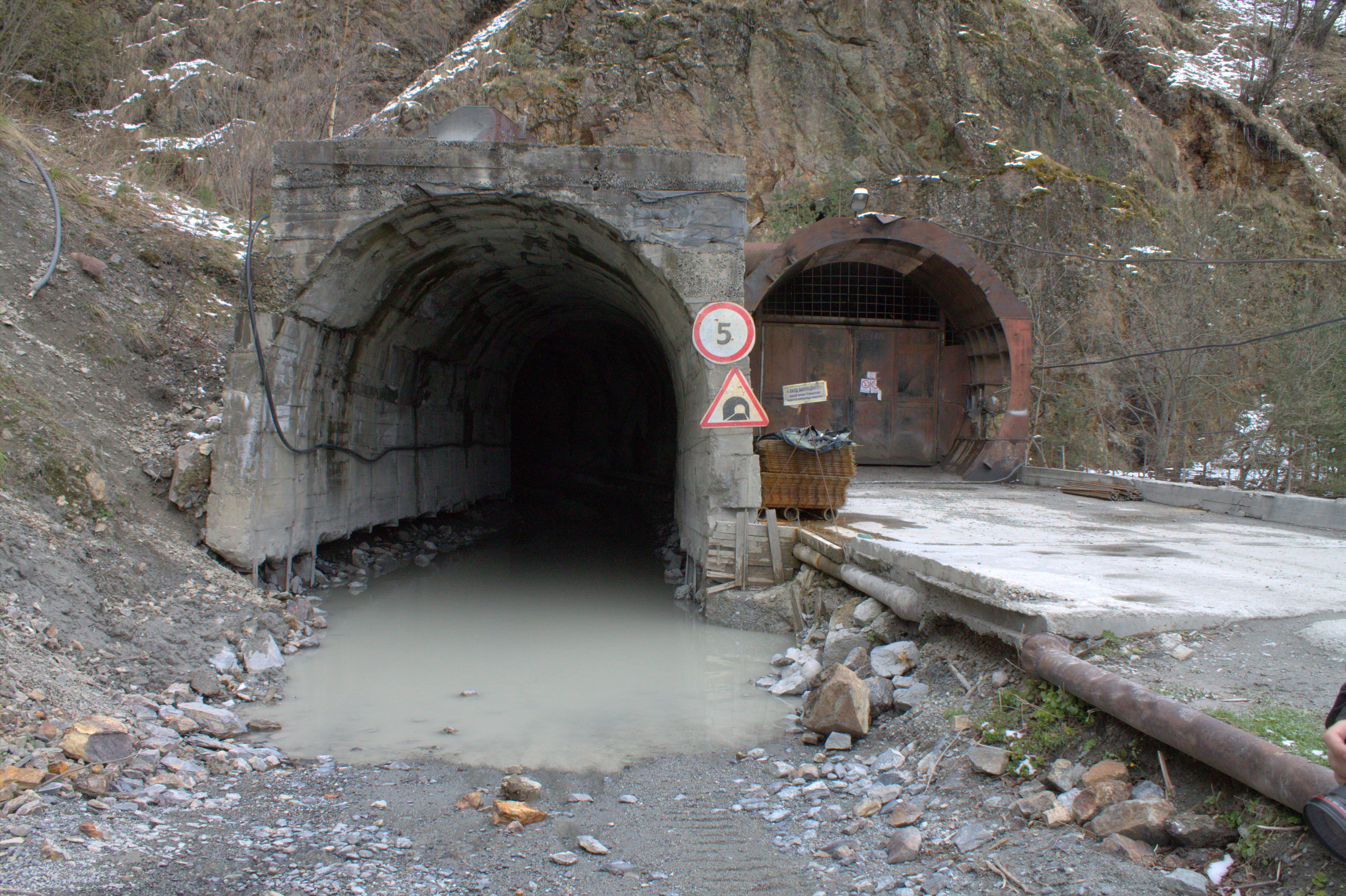
Approach adit to the diversion tunnel

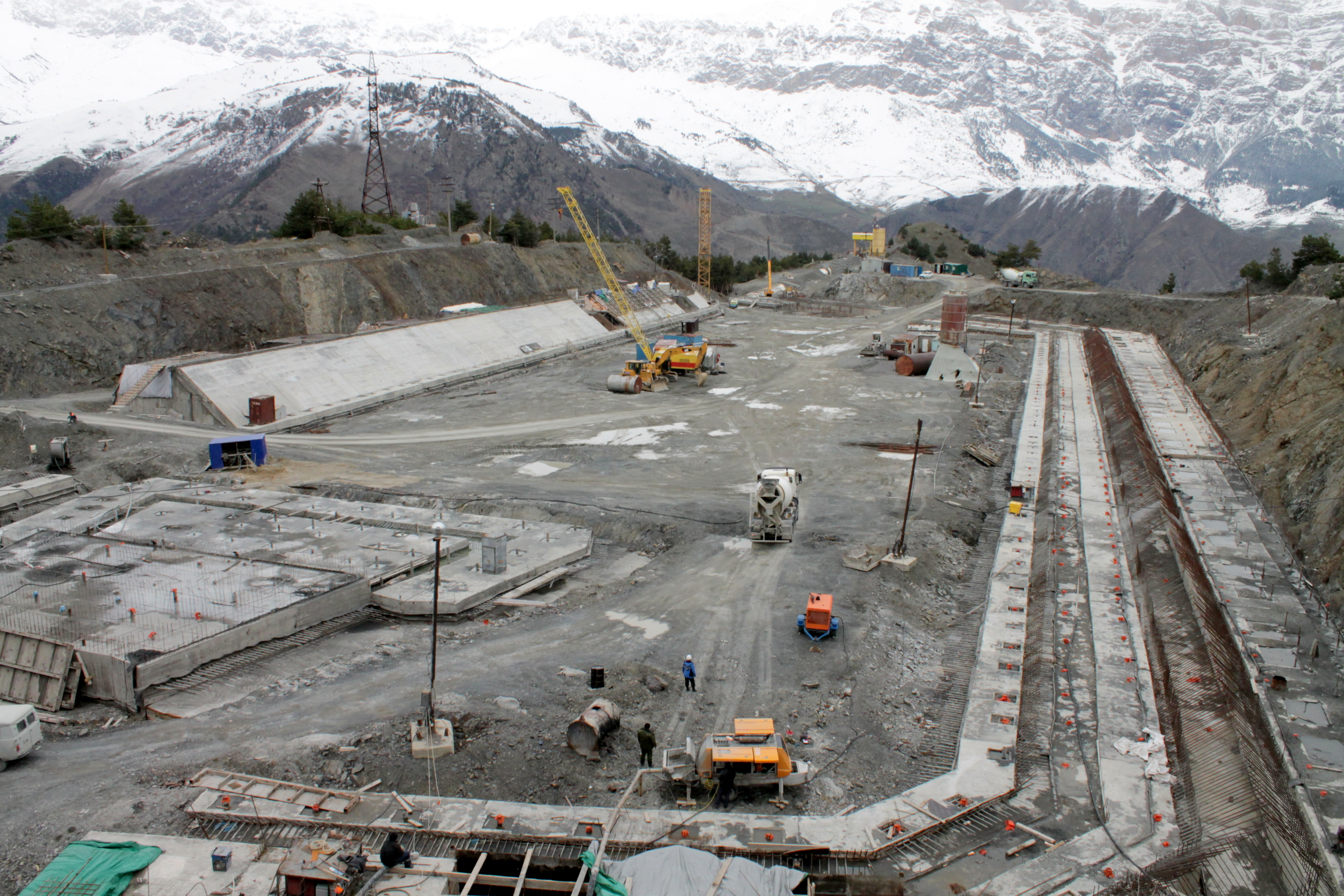
Daily regulation basin

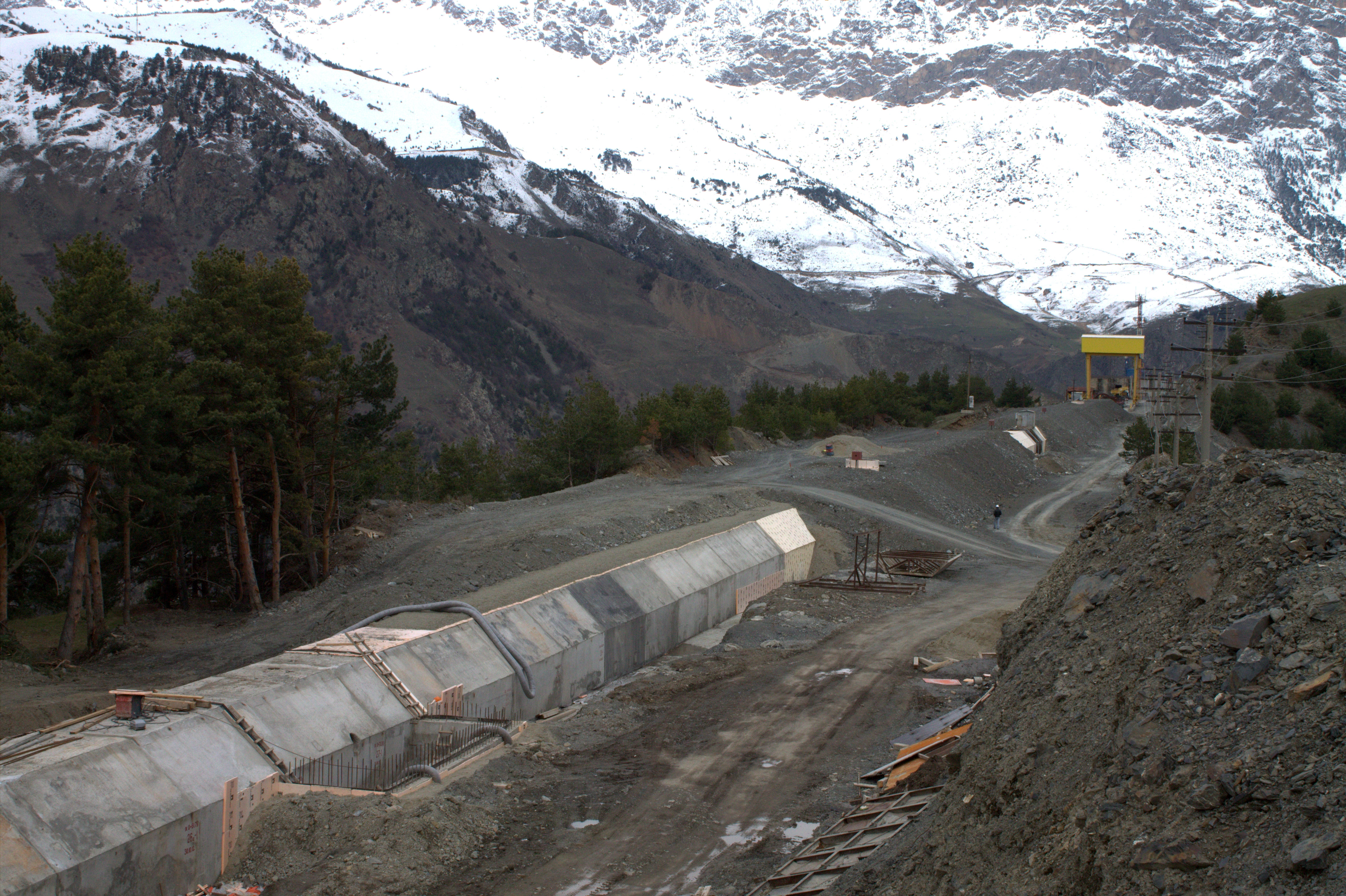
Steel-reinforced concrete conduit

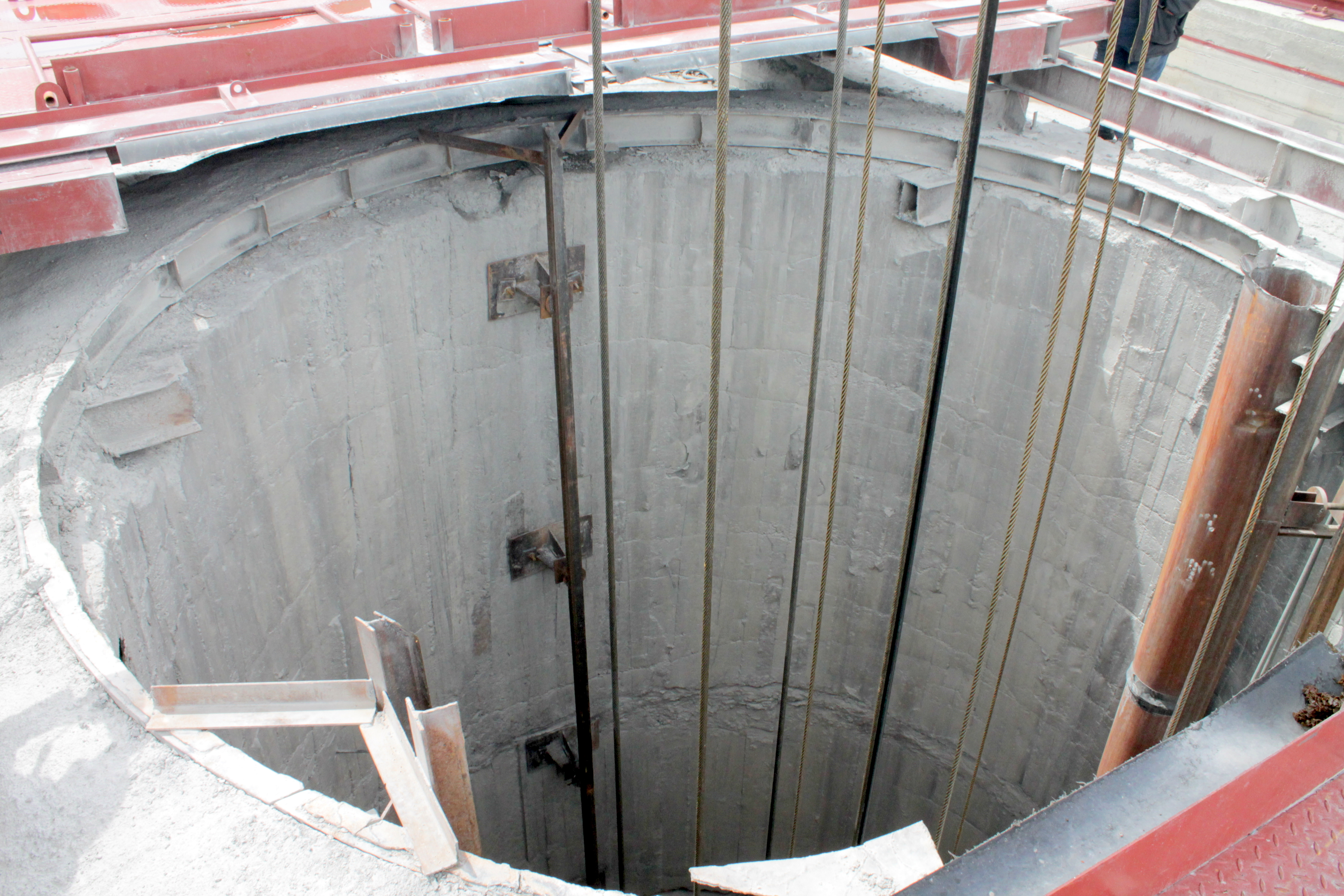
Vertical shaft

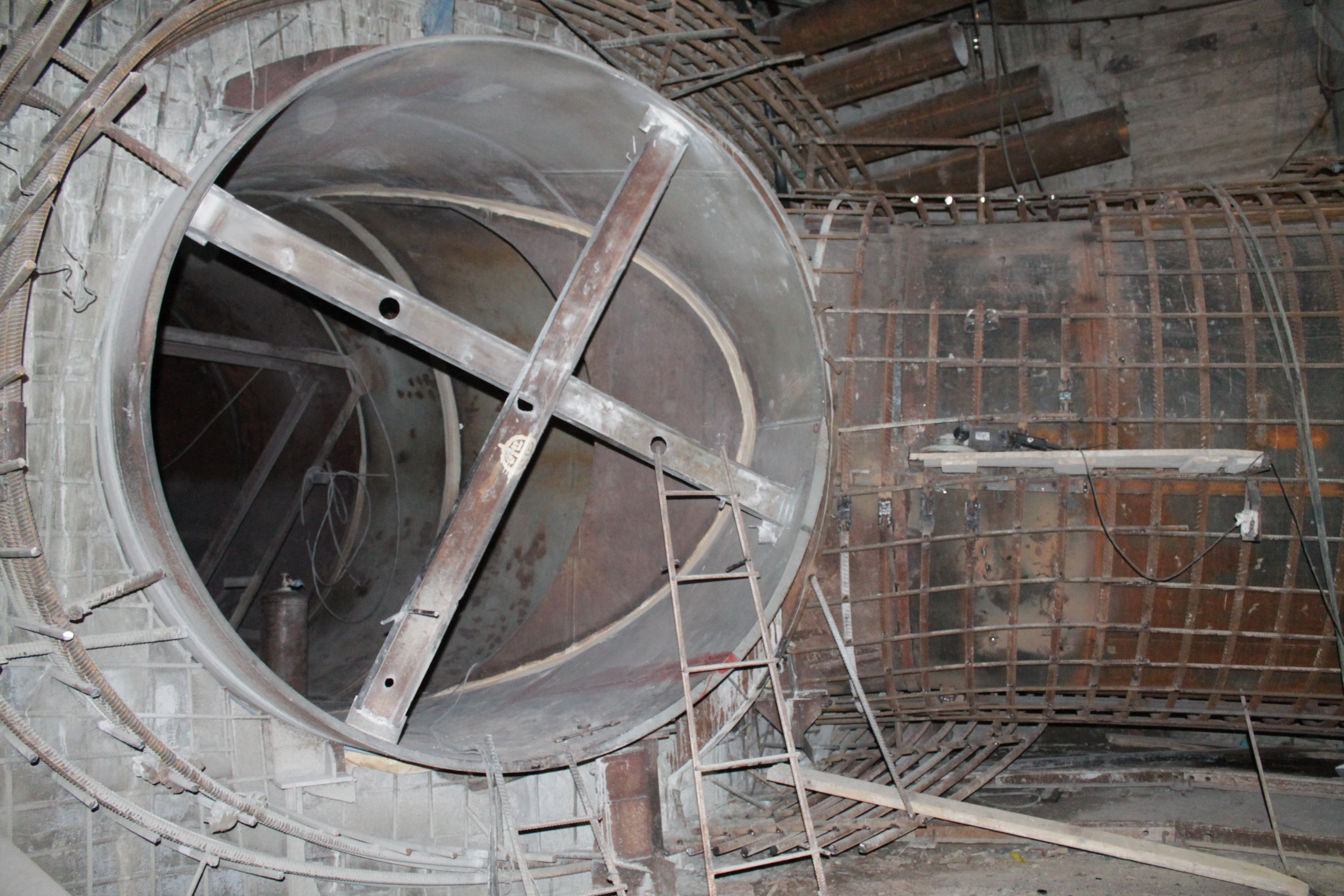
Conduit fork chamber

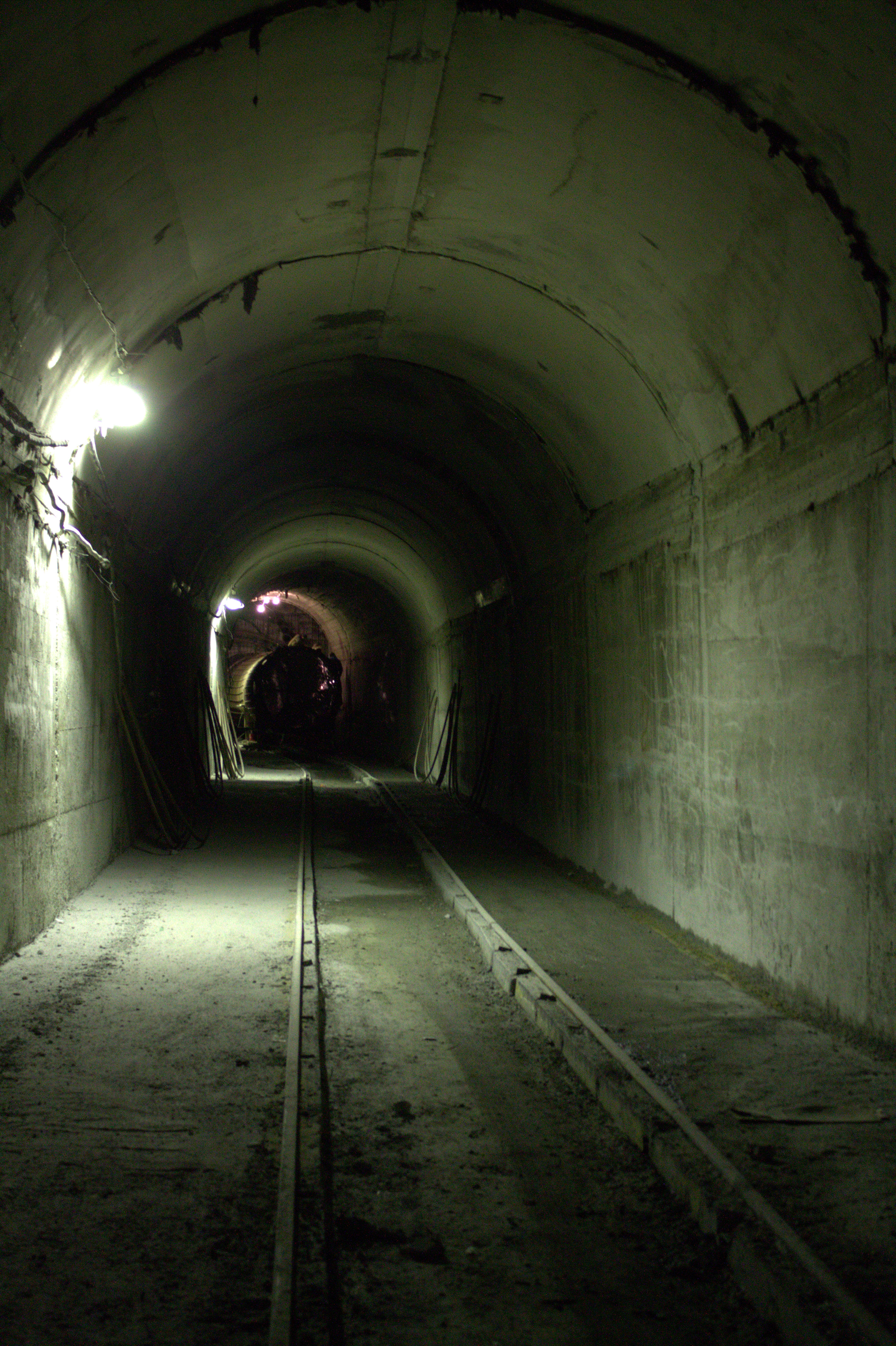
Sub-horizontal conduit tunnel

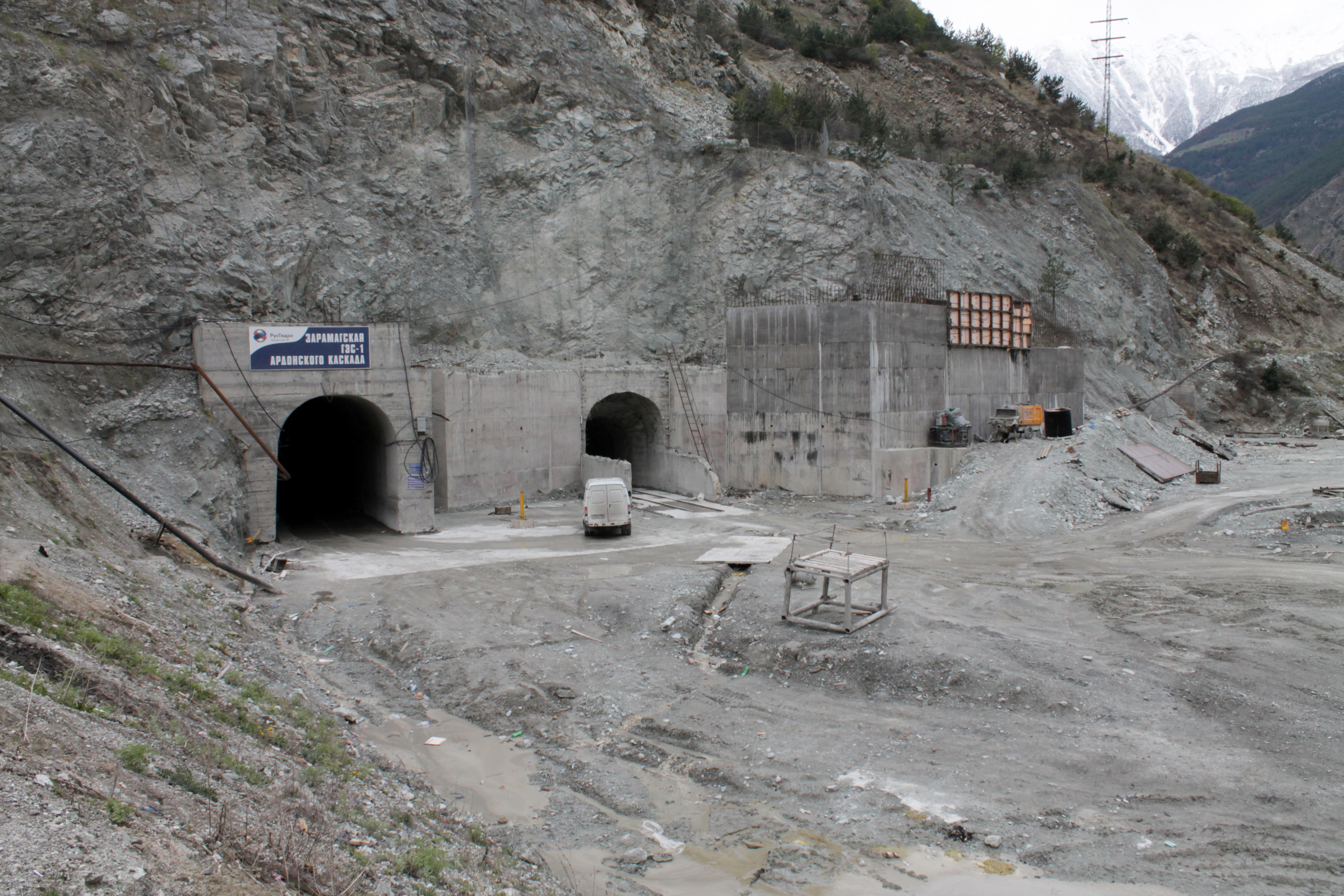
HPS building site

In 2015, a final decision was made to complete the construction of Zaramag HPS-1. The facility was again included in RusHydro's investment program, and station construction was resumed. As of early 2015, the station's readiness was estimated at 60%. During 2015, the driving of the diversion tunnel was completed, cladding was installed on most of the vertical shaft, installation of cladding and concreting continued in the sub-horizontal conduits (in one of them, more than 5000 m was installed and concreted, in the second — 30 m). In 2016, work on installing the vertical shaft cladding was completed, intensive construction and installation work was carried out in the sub-horizontal conduits and at the daily regulation basin site (in particular, concreting of the DRB bottom began). In addition, work began on dismantling sections of the diversion tunnel lining 4200 m long, made in the 1980s–1990s with low quality and not meeting modern seismic resistance requirements, followed by installation of new lining. In 2017, construction of the Zaramag HPS-1 building began, as well as driving of the daily regulation basin emergency spillway. In 2018, installation of hydraulic turbines and ball gates began, concrete works at the daily regulation basin were completed. Investments in construction amounted to more than 9 billion rubles. In 2019, construction and installation work was completed, tests of both hydro units, hydraulic tract, and electrical equipment were conducted. On September 28 and November 13, 2019, comprehensive tests of both hydro units were completed, after which the hydro units were accepted into commercial operation. The station was commissioned at the end of 2019, the solemn commissioning ceremony of Zaramag HPS-1 took place on February 4, 2020.

== Operation ==
On September 28, 2009, heavy snowfalls damaged the transmission lines from Russia to South Ossetia, through which the republic is powered. The section of the transmission line from the border to the Head HPS remained operational, which allowed the station to ensure power delivery to South Ossetia until the consequences of the natural disaster were eliminated. On June 1, 2010, the Head Zaramag HPS was leased to the North Ossetian branch of "RusHydro" for further operation.

Electricity generation of the Head HPS
Year	2009	2010	2011	2012	2013	2014	2015	2016	2017	2018
Generation, million kWh	3.11	29.2	30.3	25.27	29.53	29.8	30.28	29.17	28.35	32.0

== See also ==
- List of longest tunnels in the world

== Bibliography ==
- Yurkievich, B. N.; Ksatkin, N. V.; Konikh, G. S. (2018). "Zaramag HPPs. Main design solutions and construction status" [Зарамагские ГЭС. Основные проектные решения и состояние строительства]. Hydrotechnics (in Russian) (2): 5–13.
- Ksatkin, N. V.; Konikh, G. S.; Petrov, V. V. (2012). "Zaramag HPPs" [Зарамагские ГЭС]. Hydrotechnical Construction (in Russian). 2012 (8): 41–45.
- Danelya, A. I.; Kochi, P. G.; Yurkievich, B. N.; Alkacev, P. Z.; Ksatkin, N. V.; Chaladze, A. I. (2007). "Zaramag HPPs: design solutions and construction progress" [Зарамагские ГЭС: проектные решения и ход строительства]. Hydrotechnical Construction (in Russian). 2007 (6): 54–59.
- Dvoretskaya, M.I.; Zhdanova, A.P.; Lushnikov, O.G.; Sliva, I.V. (2018). Renewable energy. Hydroelectric power stations of Russia [Возобновляемая энергия. Гидроэлектростанции России]. St. Petersburg: Publishing House of Peter the Great St. Petersburg Polytechnic University. p. 224. ISBN 978-5-7422-6139-1.
