= Dzuarikau–Tskhinvali pipeline =

Gas pipeline between Russia and Georgia

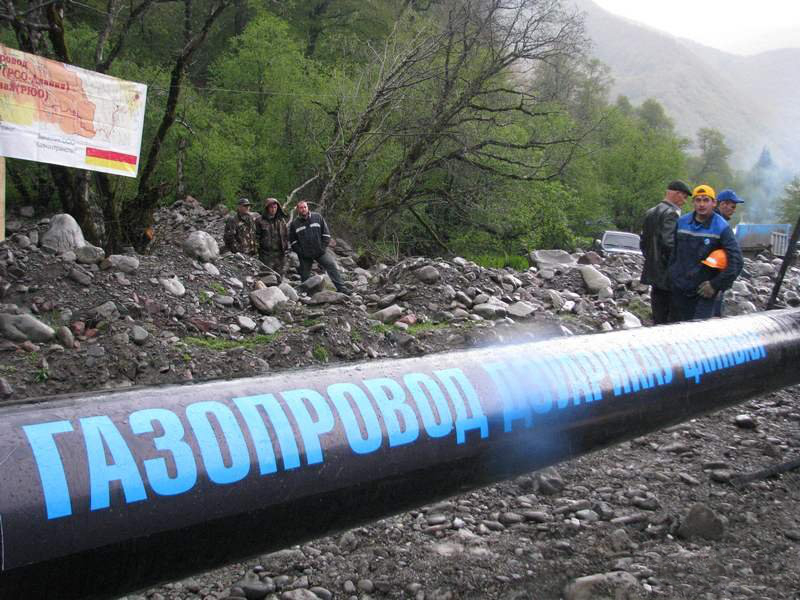
- Construction of pipeline (2008)

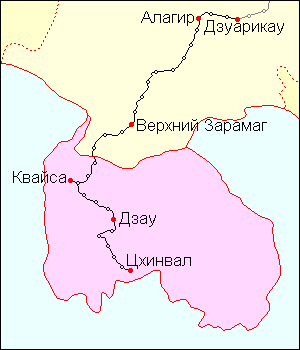
- Location of Dzuarikau–Tskhinvali pipeline

Location
- Country: Russia, Georgia (South Ossetia)
- Direction: north–south
- Start: Dzuarikau, North Ossetia
- To: Tskhinvali, South Ossetia

General information
- Type: natural gas
- Operator: Gazprom
- Commissioned: 2009

Technical information
- Length: 162.3 km (100.8 mi)
- Maximum discharge: 252.5 million cubic meters per year

The Dzuarikau–Tskhinvali pipeline (Iron Ossetic: Газуадзæн «Дзуарыхъæу—Цхинвал») is a natural gas pipeline running from the village of Dzuarikau in North Ossetia to Tskhinvali, South Ossetia. Construction started in 2006, and gas supplies started in September 2009.

== History ==
Construction of the pipeline was planned for a long time and it started in December 2006. It was launched on 26 August 2009.

Previously, South Ossetia was supplied from the Agara-Tskhinvali leg of the Tbilisi-Kutaisi trunk system of Georgia. After the Georgian-Ossetian conflict, supplies to South Ossetia from Georgia were cut off. According to Georgia, the cause was a damaged section of the pipeline within South Ossetia, while Russia denied the damage and accused Georgia of the deliberate cutoff. Supplies were restored in January 2009.

== Technical description ==
The length of the pipeline is 162.3 kilometres (100.8 mi) and it has capacity of 252.5 million cubic meters of natural gas per year. The diameter of the pipeline is 426 millimetres (16.8 in). Around 70.2 kilometres (43.6 mi) of the pipeline is in South Ossetian territory. The pipeline passes through mountainous regions with a maximum altitude of 3,148 metres (10,328 ft) above sea level. It has been reported that the pipeline may be the located the highest in the world. The cost of construction was 15 billion rubles (US$476 million). The pipeline is operated by Gazprom Transgaz Stavropol, a subsidiary of Gazprom. It was built by Stroyprogress.

== Political significance ==
The pipeline was said to be important for the de facto independence of South Ossetia, because it "shakes off the last levers exerted by its unfriendly neighbour". The Georgian foreign ministry protested against the launch of the pipeline.

== See also ==
- Energy in Georgia (country)
- Energy in Russia
