= Verkhny Fiagdon =

Verkhny Fiagdon Верхний Фиагдон

Other transcription(s)
  - Ossetic: Уæллаг Фиййагдон
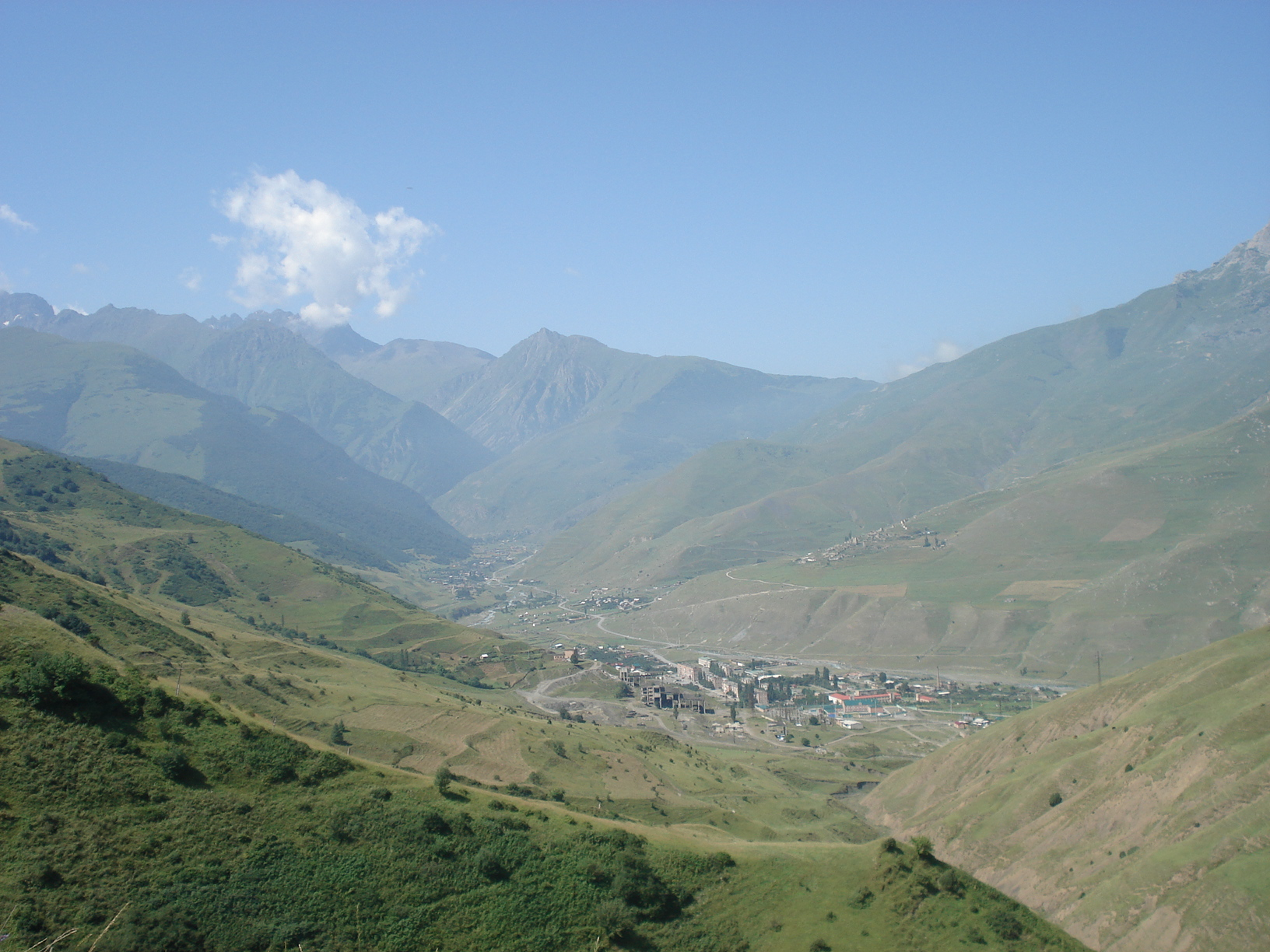
- Interactive map of Verkhny Fiagdon
- Location of Verkhny Fiagdon Verkhny Fiagdon (North Ossetia–Alania)
- Coordinates: 42°50′00″N 44°18′13″E
- Country: Russia
- Federal subject: North Ossetia–Alania
- Elevation: 970 m (3,180 ft)

Population
  - Estimate (2002): 1,083 )
- Time zone: UTC+3 (MSK)
- Postal code: 363203
- OKTMO ID: 90605453101

Verkhny Fiagdon or Upper Fiagdon (Iron Ossetic: Уæллаг Фиййагдон; Wællag Fijjagdon, Russian: Верхний Фиагдон) is a settlement in Alagirsky District of North Ossetia–Alania (Russia). Verkhny Fiagdon is located in Kurtat valley on the river Fiagdon.
