= Ardon (river) =

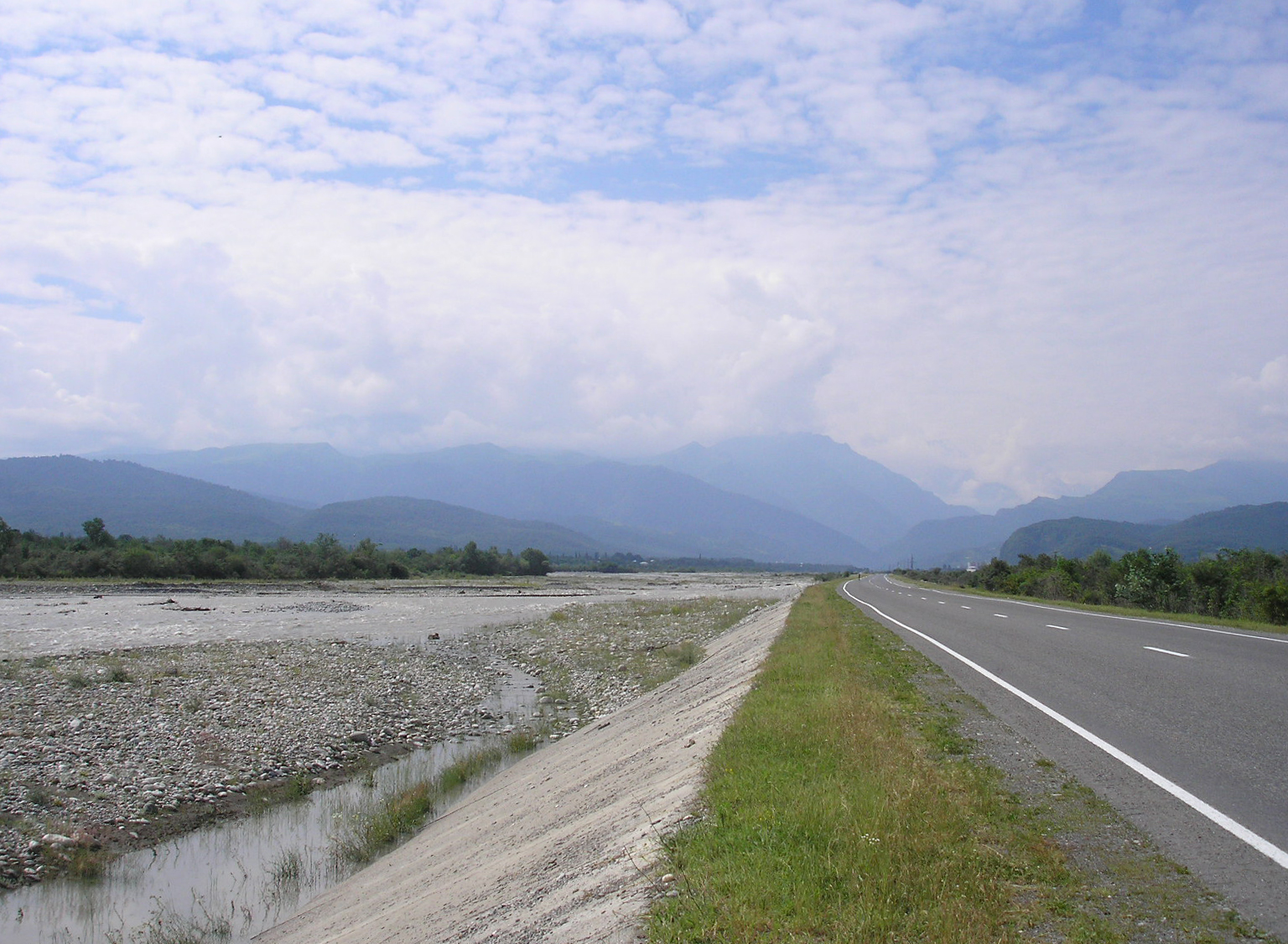

- Location of mouth in Russia Ardon (river) (Caucasus Mountains)

Location
- Country: North Ossetia–Alania (Russia)

Physical characteristics
- Source
  - location: Greater Caucasus
- Mouth: Terek
  - coordinates: 43.2395°N 44.3123°E
- Length: 102 km (63 mi)
- Basin size: 2,700 km^{2} (1,000 sq mi)

Basin features
- Progression: Terek→ Caspian Sea

The Ardon (Russian: Ардон; Iron Ossetic: Ӕрыдон, romanized: Ærydon) is a river in North Ossetia–Alania, Russia. It is a left tributary of the Terek. Ardon flows northward and slightly eastward to join the Terek northwest of Vladikavkaz. Its main tributary is the Fiagdon, which parallels it on the east and joins it near its mouth. The length of the Ardon is 102 kilometres (63 mi), and the area of its drainage basin is 2,700 square kilometres (2,700 km^{2}). The Ardon originates in the glaciers of the Greater Caucasus. The Ossetian Military Road crossed the valley of the Ardon.

The Ardon River is formed from the confluence of the Mamisondon, Nardon, Adaykom, and Tsmiakomdon rivers, which are sourced from the glaciers of the Main Caucasian Range. It flows through the North Ossetian Reserve, passing through the deep Alagir Gorge and the Transcaucasian Highway before reaching the Ossetian plain. The Alagir Gorge is also home to the Sadon deposit of lead-zinc ores, as well as villages like Buron, Sadon, Upper Zgid, and Mizur.

Once the river enters the plain near the city of Alagir, its waters are used for irrigation purposes. The city of Ardon is located 7 kilometres (4.3 mi) from the confluence of the Ardon and Terek rivers, and the Ardon River receives its largest right tributary, the Fiagdon, near the mouth.

Along a section of the river with a length of 16 kilometres (9.9 mi) from the village of Nizhniy Zaramag to the confluence of the Baddon River, there is a cascade of operating Zaramag hydropower plants, including the Golovnaya HPP with a capacity of 15 MW and the Zaramagskaya HPP-1 with a capacity of 346 MW. There are plans to build the Zaramagskaya HPP-2 with a capacity of 72.9 MW, and earlier plans for the construction of the Zaramag HPP-3 (Tamisk) with a capacity of 46 MW have been made.

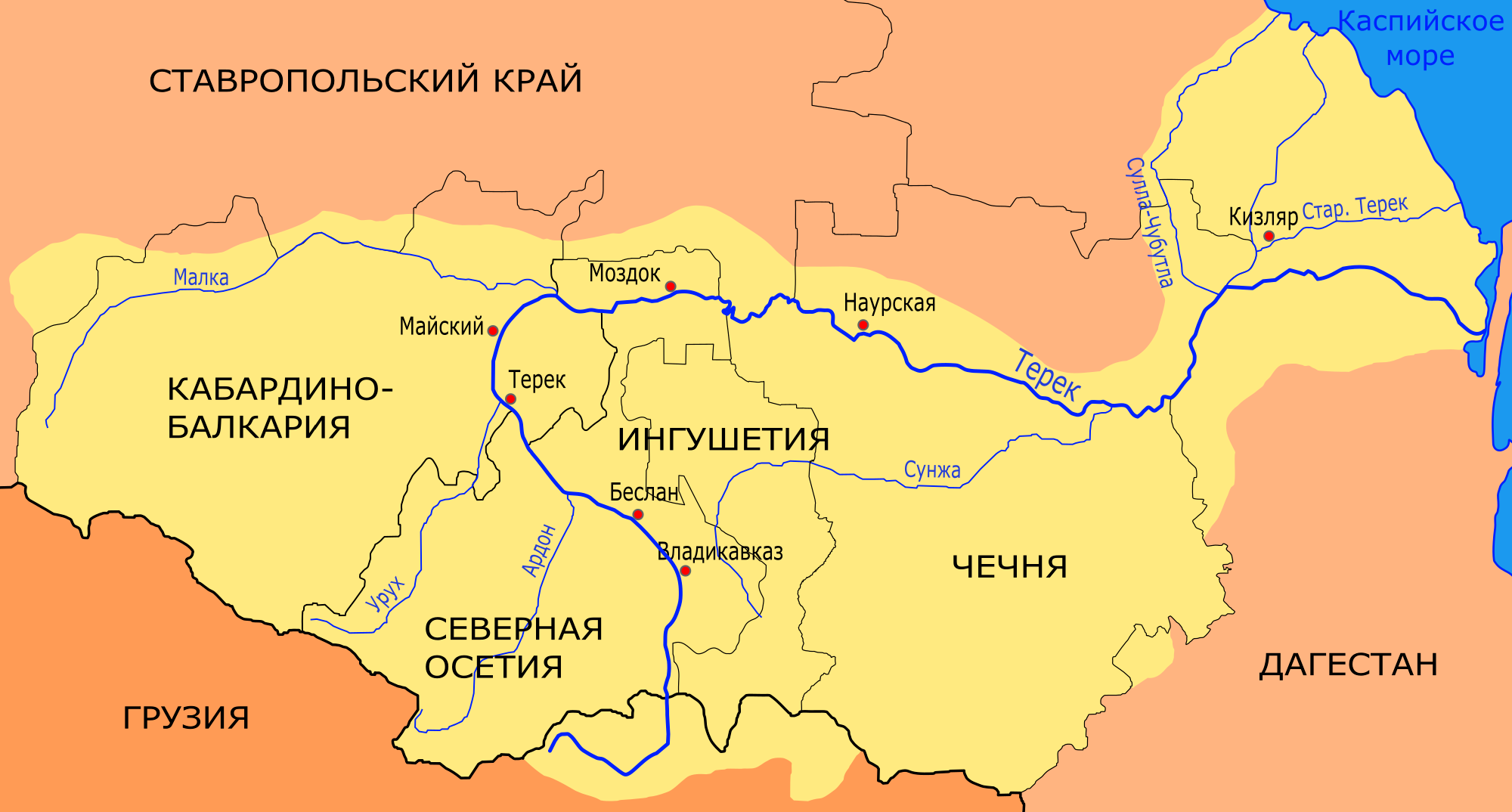
