= Dzuarikau =

Dzuarikau Дзуарикау
- Interactive map of Dzuarikau
- Location of Dzuarikau
- Coordinates: 43°01′09″N 44°24′24″E
- Country: Russia
- Federal subject: North Ossetia–Alania
- Founded: 1914

Population (2010 Census)
  - Total: 1,697
  - Estimate (2025): 1,797 (+5.9%)
- Time zone: UTC+3 (MSK)
- Postal code: 363206
- OKTMO ID: 90605410101

Dzuarikau (Russian: Дзуарикау; Iron Ossetic: Дзуарыхъæу, romanized: Dzuaryqæu) is a village in North Ossetia in Russia. The Dzuarikau–Tskhinvali pipeline, a natural gas corridor leading to South Ossetia, begins at this village. The village is situated on both banks of the Fiagdon River, at the entrance to the Kurtatinsky Gorge. It is located 18 kilometres (11 mi) east of the regional center Alagir and 22 kilometres (14 mi) west of Vladikavkaz.

Geographically, Dzuarikau is located in the Caucasus region of southern Russia. The village is situated at an elevation of approximately 677 metres (2,221 ft) above sea level and is surrounded by the Caucasus Mountains.
