= Abano =

Abano may refer to:

- Pietro d'Abano (c.1257 – 1315), Italian philosopher, astrologer and professor of medicine
- Abano Glacier, a glacier in Georgia
- Abano (Kareli municipality), a village in Kareli municipality, Georgia
- Abano (Kazbegi municipality), a village in Kazbegi municipality, Georgia
- Abano Pass, a mountain pass in Georgia
- Abano Terme, a town and comune in the Padua province of Italy
