= Temruqo's campaigns in Central Caucasus =

Kabardian campaigns in the North Caucasus between 1552 and 1567

Kabardian conquest of Central Caucasus
- Part of Russian expansion and Circassian expansion
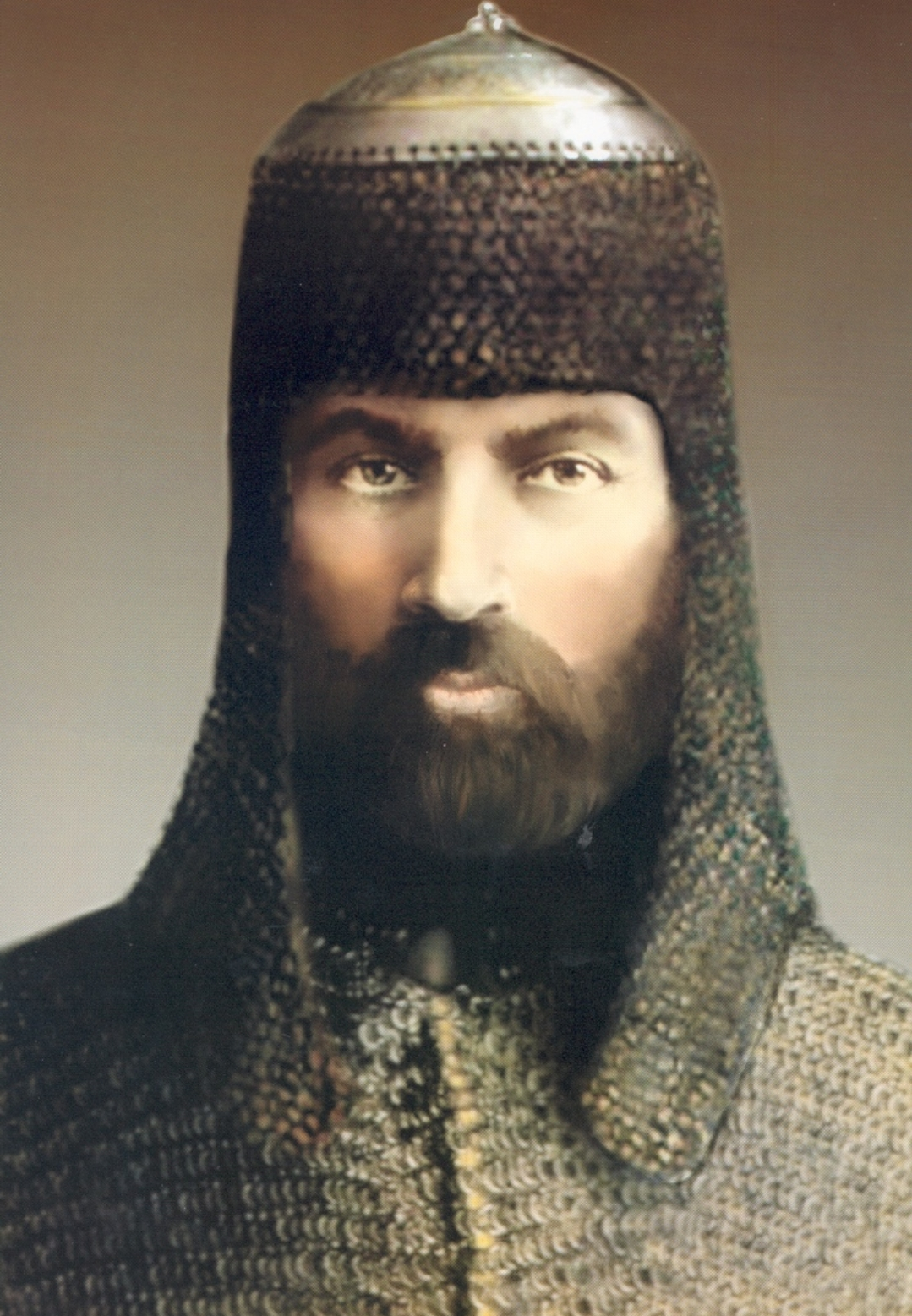
- Modern depiction of the famous Kabardian prince Temruqo the Brave.
Date	1552 – 1567
Location	North Caucasus; Dagestan, Kabardia: Darial Gorge, Dzheyrakh Gorge, Kazbek Gorge
Result	Circassian victory: Destruction of 164+ settlements; see more: • Expulsion of the Ingush into the mountains; • Ingush–Chechen societies pay tribute to the Kabardians; • Ossetians fall under Kabardian suzerainty; • Mass devastation of Svan territories; • Western Kumyk possessions fall to Kabardian control; • Temruqo solidified power in Kabardia; • Annexation of the taverns of Qeytuqeys by Yidarey principality; • Rising Russo-Circassian influence over North Caucasus
Territorial changes	Circassian conquest of the Central Caucasus

Belligerents
Pro–Temruqo coalition: Principality of Yidarey (Note: The Yidarey dynasty migrated east and started controlling the land of Lesser Kabardia after the death of Prince Jilakhstan.); Talostaney; Abazashta; Principality of Besleney; Nogai Horde; Don Cossacks; Supported by: Tsardom of Russia	Anti–Temruqo coalition: Principality of Pshiapshoqo; Shamkhalate of Tarki; Lesser Nogai Horde; Avar Khanate; (Ingushetia) Ingush Societies; Feappii society; Chechen Societies; Ossetian Societies; Digor Society; Kurtatin Society; Tagaur Society; Ksani Eristavate; Svans (Note: the Nikon Chronicle reports the campaign as directed against the regions referred to as the "Mshan" and the "Son" in the Central Caucasus, According to modern historians, the so-called "Son" people are to be identified with the Svans, who are still referred to as "sone" in the Kabardian language); Supported by: Crimean Khanate; Ottoman Empire

Commanders and leaders
Temruqo the Brave; Asakhmet Asekhu (Note: According to Ingush legends, Prince Asakhmet, who later fought the Ingush again, was involved in this incursion too.); Mamstruk Cherkasy; Vartan Ortanov; Tepsaruqo Talostan; Tinahmet Bey; Yelzheruqo Qanoqo; Lev Achba; Ivan Semyonovich; Ivan Dashkov; Grigory Pleshcheyev	Pshiapshoqo Qeytuqo (surrendered); Aslanbech I Qeytuqo (surrendered); Jansokh Qeytuqo (surrendered); Qanshau Jilakhstan †; Buday I †; Surkhay I †; Muhammad Shamkhal †; Shakhmal of Richa †; Khadan Utsmi †; Ghazi ibn Urak (Ingushetia) Temishka Mirza † (Ingushetia) Burnat (POW) (Ingushetia) Ezdnaur (POW) (Ingushetia) Burnak (POW) (Ingushetia) Dudyl (POW); Aznaur (POW); Dudar (POW); Devlet I Giray (Ottoman Empire) Selim II

Temruqo's conquest of Central Caucasus or Mshansk-Sonsk Campaigns were a series of military expeditions conducted between 1552 and 1567 by the famous Kabardian prince Temruqo and his allies against various groups in the Central Caucasus. The campaigns involved forces from Kabardia, allied Circassian principalities, the Nogai Horde, and the Tsardom of Russia, and targeted communities inhabiting the mountain regions of the central North Caucasus, including areas around the Darial Gorge.

The expeditions formed part of Temruqo's efforts to strengthen Kabardian influence in the region. These campaigns affected the political balance in the Central Caucasus during the mid-16th century and occurred within the broader context of growing political and military cooperation between Temruqo and the Russian state.

== Background ==
=== Russo-Circassian Alliance ===
Temruqo was a skilled ruler and military leader. He noticed the increasing military support from the Ottomans to the Tatars and feared this would affect the Circassians' ability to thwart any possible assault. Temruqo explored the possible allies, and settled his choice on the Tsarist Russia. In 1557, Temruqo sent a delegation to Moscow to seek alliance with the Russians. The delegation included his sons Sultan Qul and Bulat Gery, who were welcomed by Ivan the Terrible. Ivan agreed to join the alliance with Kabardia.

Based on the treaty of alliance between the Circassians and the Russians, Circassian cavalry forces participated in several battles with the Russian army in Poland and the Baltics. Ivan supported Temruqo's goal to extend his power inside Circassia and to unify the lands of Circassians under his reign. Temruqo established a fort in Mozdok that enabled the Circassian and Russian forces to perform joint training. Ossetian and Ingushetian lands, as well as the Turkic people, became subjects of the Kabardian raising power. Temruqo's expansion extended towards the Georgian kingdoms in the south.

In 1560, Anastasia Romanovna, Ivan's first wife, died. It was proposed that Ivan would marry Catherine Jagiellon in öderken to strengthen diplomatic relations with Poland. However Ivan instead decided to marry Temruqo's daughter, Gwashanay. A high-level delegation was sent to betroth Gwashanay. She was accompanied by her brother, Sultan Qul, on her way to Moscow. Gwashanay was later baptized and became known as Maria Temruqoovna. Her brother married the daughter of a member of the tsar's entourage who handled the state treasury. He was later baptized and became known as Mikhael.

=== Background of the Circassian-Kumyk War ===
In the 16th century, the powerful Kabardian princes, in their desire to expand their territorial borders and strengthen their influence, encountered opposition from the Shamkhalate of Tarki, whose rulers sought to push back Kabardian influence and subordinate them to their authority. The Shamkhal of Tarki regarded the Kabardian princes as his most dangerous adversaries in achieving these aims. The contradictions between the Shamkhal and the Kabardian princes were further exacerbated by the policies of the Ottoman Empire and the Crimean Khanate. The Shamkhal viewed Russia’s consistent support of Kabarda as an undesirable strengthening of his rival, which complicated relations between Tarki and Russia. In their struggle for dominance in the northeastern Caucasus, both the Kumyk and Kabardian princes attracted other regional rulers to their respective sides. The feudal groupings thus formed resorted, depending on the political situation in the Caucasus, to the assistance of neighboring states.

Upon becoming Grand Prince of Kabardia in the 1550s, Temruqo faced opposition from several Kabardian princes who sought the position of Grand Prince of Kabardia for themselves. Among them was the Kabardian prince Qanshao Jilakhstenqo, son of Jilakhsten, who, after leaving Kabardia, allied with the Kumyks and reportedly raided Kabardian territory multiple times each year. According to some accounts, during the summer these forces attacked hayfields and disrupted the harvest of millet—the principal agricultural crop of the Kabardians—forcing much of the population, except those mobilized for militia service, to seek refuge in the Kistin Gorge. These actions are said to have been motivated by the seizure of Qanshao’s lands by the families of Bitu and Maremshao Yidar.

== Military Campaigns ==
=== Svan-Ossetian-Ingush campaign ===
Judging by the Nikon chronicle, in the september of 1562, Temruqo together with his Russian and Nogai allies led campaigns against the "Mshansk" and "Sonsk" taverns. The word "Mshansk" is believed to be derived from the Kabardian word for Ingush, "мыщхыш" (mishkhish) the "Sonsk" taverns or the "Son" people are identified to be the Svan people by modern historians, as the Svans are still called "Sone" in the Kabardian language to this day. Sources also mention Ossetians taking place in the conflict, with the societies of Digor, Kurartin, and Tagaur, together with the Ksani Eristavate being mentioned as taking side in this campaign.

Before this campaign, Temruqo requested military aid from Ivan the Terrible to "defeat their enemies" in central caucasus. Thus, the Russian Tsar sent Temruqo a total of 1000+ Russian-Cossack forces to move under his command. In september, Temruqo with the help of the Russian commander Grigory Pleshcheyev and other Nogai Murzas, started his campaign in the central Caucasus, aiming to establish dominance over the region.

Temruqo launched his aggressive expedition in september and advanced into the lands of the central Caucasian people, causing destruction and killing many inhabitants. The Kabardian-Russian-Nogai forces expanded deeper into the territories, attacking the Tatsky and Skinsky regions, they reportedly destroyed 164 Ingush-Svan-Ossetian taverns and captured the towns of Mokhan, Kavan, and Engir. Temishka Murza was murdered in the campaign, and the Ingush nobles Burnat, Ezdnaur, Burnak, and Dudyl, as well as the Ossetian nobles of Aznaur and Dudar were taken as prisoners. this campaign caused the Ingushes to retreat deeper into the mountainous gorges.

Following the campaign, some of the Feappii retreated into the mountains, while others migrated to the Aukh region under the protection of the Shamkhalate of Tarki. According to the Ingush historian and archivist Bersnako Gazikov, this campaign took place in the regions of Yoalkhote, Sunzha, Darial, and Gazalte. According to Ingush legendary songs, the folkloric Ingush noble Cherbazh was "terribly wounded" during the incursion and fled the region, later settling in the village of Aulurt located near Dzheyrakh-Aramkhi rivers.

The legendary Ingush song "Makhinan" talks about this campaign:

When it happened no one remembers, It must have been about three hundred years ago. Our people at that time were wealthy.

Living in the valley of Doksolji, They multiplied quickly up to the Achaluk Mountains, and would have lived there to this day if not for the devil, who became annoyed That people were living so freely.

It is known that the devil does not like the satisfied, he prefers that people cry more.

So he began to scheme, inventing ways to take away their happiness, and he devised a punishment. He gathered his servants And gave them an order To remove all the happy ones from the plain, scattering them through distant mountains and gorges.

And the spirits, having received the command, immediately spread out In different directions, to quickly carry out the order.

And that is why, one night, in the darkness, the Nogai hordes With a crowd of Kabardian princes Attacked our villages, whose inhabitants were all sleeping peacefully.

Slaughter began everywhere, And blood covered the valley. Fires blazed everywhere.

Our forefathers, jumping up from sleep, had no weapons in their hands With which to repel the attack, And they all died in the furious battle.

Women, maidens, and children wept bitterly, As they were taken captive by the Nogais.

Soon the merciless enemy finished with our unfortunate people.

Whoever survived fled straight into the mountains, Seeking safety in the rocky caves.

=== First Circassian-Kumyk War ===
In 1552, the Kumyks, with several allies, went to war with the Kabardians. These military confrontations and border clashes lasted until 1567, where the Kumyk Shamkhal Budai I was killed by the Kabardian forces, and the war ended in a Circassian victory. The Kumyks were allied with the Nogais from Lesser Nogai Horde, Avars from the Avar Nutsaldom, and the Kabardian princes from factions that were against the rule of Temruqo the Brave of Kabardia. The Kabardians were allied with the Western Circassians from the Principality of Besleney and Abazinia, and got military aid from the Tsardom of Russia.

==== Battle of Kishzhibek ====
In 1552, Kabardian prince Qanshao Jilakhstenqo persuaded the Avar Utsmi—identified in the sources as Khadan Utsmi—to invade Kabardia, whose population was reportedly weakened by internal strife. Khadan accepted and called upon his allies, including the Nogais and the Kumyks, assembling a united force against the Kabardians. In response, the Kabardians called upon their Trans-Kuban allies, the Abazins under Lev Achba and the Besleneys under Aldjeruqo Qanoqo.

Supreme command of the allied Kabardian forces was entrusted to Prince Aldjeruqo. As the Avar Utsmi crossed the Terek River, Prince Aldjeruqo and his advance guard met the invading force and attempted negotiations. After negotiations failed, Aldjeruqo withdrew to prepared defensive positions. Two days later, the Utsmi advanced toward the trenches, and Aldjeruqo engaged the enemy. A fierce battle followed, reportedly lasting two days. According to a legend preserved by the Ortanov family, this battle marked the Kabardians’ first encounter with firearms. During the fighting, Kabardian forces reportedly heard a thunderous roar and observed smoke rising near Chegem. A volunteer named Vartan was said to have crossed the Chegem River at night and captured a matchlock from Dagestani troops. For this act, he was allegedly elevated to the rank of wark (noble).

On the third day, hostilities resumed. During the renewed fighting, the Utsmi was killed, causing confusion among his forces. According to the legend, the Kabardians exploited this disorder, launched a coordinated assault, and drove the opposing army toward the Terek River. It is claimed that only one-third of the invading force managed to escape. In the course of the battle, Prince Koshkao, described as one of the instigators of the campaign, was also killed. The battle thereafter became known as Kishzhibek, a name interpreted as meaning “salvation lies not in stone walls, but in the courage of men.” The battle is commemorated in the following traditional song:

Our mowers have postponed their work until next summer, and our ripe millet has been destroyed by wild boars.

Our herdsmen galloped home on bare saddles. Our young women wept bitterly.

Our people were worn out from the constant walking into the gorges; even the iron boilers were damaged on the road.

We placed our hopes on the Chegem trenches, stood ready for battle, and our princes inspected the Kishzhibek positions.

Utsmiy was eager for battle! A bloody battle began; our two detachments of troops joined forces in the fortifications.

The blood of the enemies flowed like a wide stream, and the corpses of the slain enemies lay on the ground like a wooden bridge.

==== Russian intervention ====
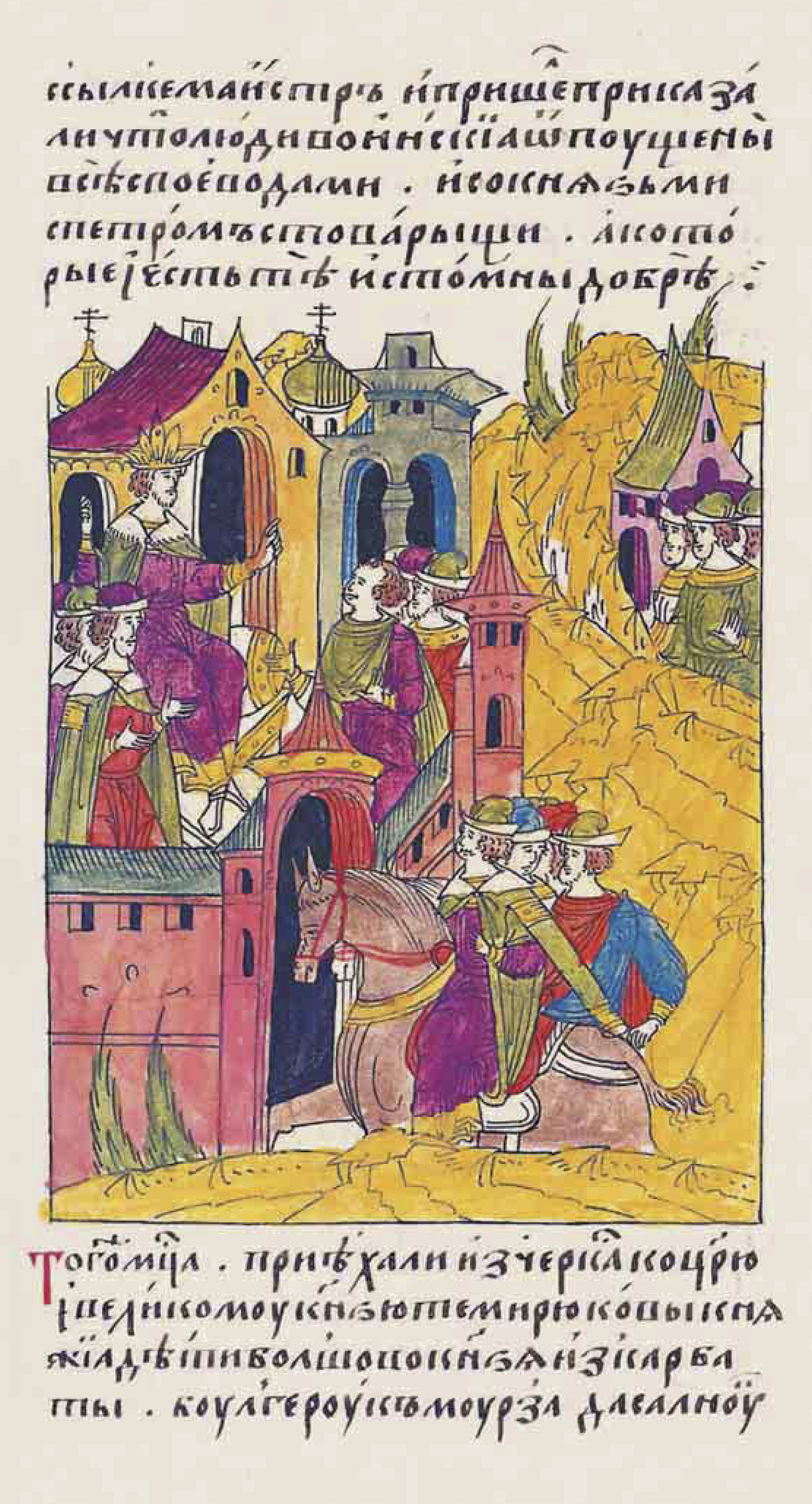
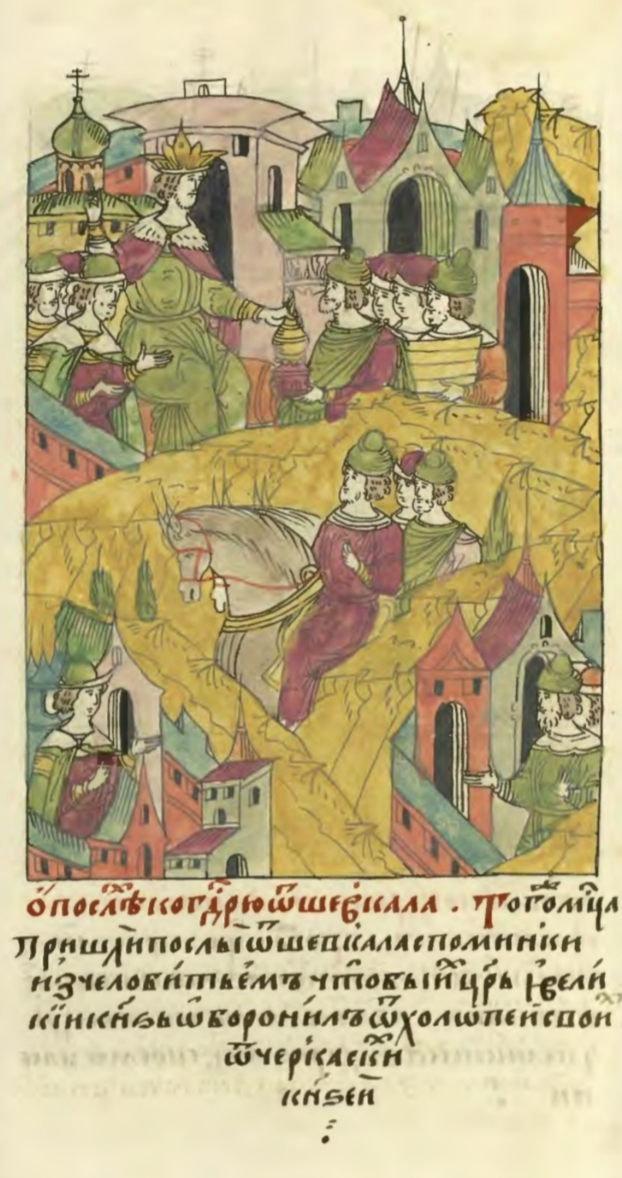
Arrival of Circassian (left) and Kumyk (right) ambassadors to Moscow

In July 1557, the Circassian mirza Kavklych Kanukov arrived at the court of Ivan the Terrible, requesting protection against the Kumyks. A similar appeal was made in October 1558 by the sons of Temruqo—Bulgeruk and Saltankul. According to the sources, information about these negotiations was communicated to the Kumyks, and in 1559 a Kumyk embassy arrived at the Russian court requesting protection from Circassian princes who had entered Russian allegiance. However, complaints received from the Kabardian Circassians accused the Kumyks of conducting raids against them. In response, the Russian government dispatched a military expedition against the Shamkhalate of Tarki in support of the Kabardians.

In the summer of 1560, an army under the voevoda I. S. Cheremisinov departed from Astrakhan by sea. Transported on vessels—likely strug boats—the force sailed along the western coast of the Caspian Sea toward Tarki, the center of the Tarki Shamkhalate. According to the chronicles, Cheremisinov’s army included streltsy, Cossacks, and the so-called “Astrakhan people.” After landing near Tarki, Cheremisinov reportedly led an assault on the settlement, located approximately two kilometers from the coast, and captured it within half a day. The voevoda did not attempt to retain control of the town; instead, it was plundered and burned.

The Russian attack on Tarki led Caucasologist E. N. Kusheva to suggest that by the mid-16th century Tarki had already emerged as the political center of the Shamkhalate. The defense of the town was reportedly led by the shamkhal himself, who retreated into the mountains following the defeat. Although his name is not recorded in the Russian chronicles, researcher L. I. Lavrov, relying on epigraphic evidence, proposed that he may have been Buday I ibn Umal-Muhammad.

The objectives and overall outcome of the 1560 campaign remain a subject of scholarly debate. Some historians argue that the planned capture of Tyumen and the Shamkhalate of Tarki was not accomplished, and that I. S. Cheremisinov did not reach Kabardia. It has also been suggested that even Russian sources do not characterize the campaign as a clear victory, and that Cheremisinov may have been forced to withdraw by the shamkhal. According to this interpretation, the voevoda’s failure to carry out the tsar’s directives—namely the capture of Tyumen and the Shamkhalate and the advance to link up with the Kabardians—indicates that the campaign did not achieve its intended strategic objectives. At the same time, it is noted that the rulers of the Shamkhalate perceived the northern advance as a serious threat to their independence.

==== Final battle ====
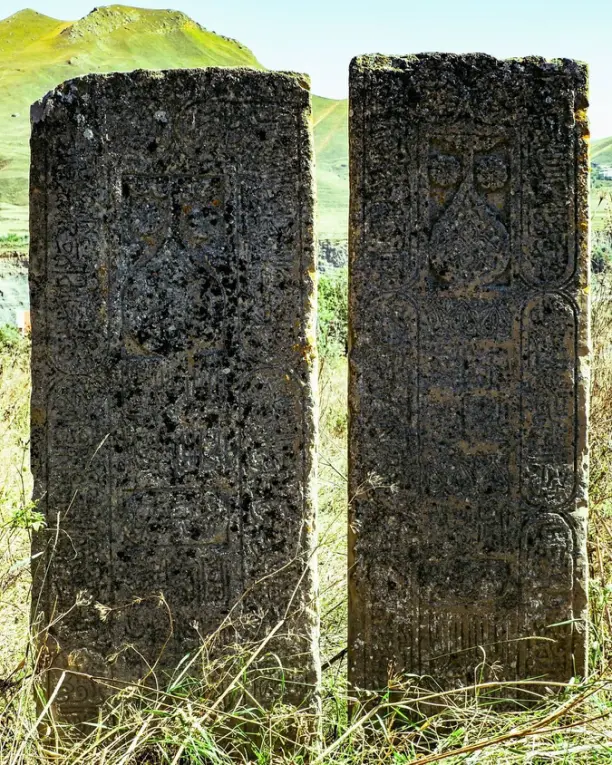
The grave of Buday I and his brother Surkhai

In 1567, the shamkhal Buday I intervened in the ongoing feudal conflict within Kabardia between the senior prince Temruqo and the rival claimant Shiapshiqo Qeytuqo. Taking advantage of this internal division, Buday aligned himself with Qeytuqo and marched into Kabardian territory with a military detachment. His intervention formed part of the broader struggle for influence in the northeastern Caucasus, where regional rulers frequently involved themselves in the dynastic disputes of neighboring polities.

A major battle subsequently took place between the faction of rulers led by Temruqo Yidar and the coalition supporting Shiapshiqo Qeytuqo. In addition to the forces of the shamkhal, the ruler of Lesser Nogai, Ghazi ibn Urak, joined Qeytuqo’s side. The confrontation represented not only an internal Kabardian succession struggle but also a wider contest between regional powers seeking to influence Kabardian affairs. The battle ended in a decisive victory for Temruqo Yidar. Shamkhal Buday was killed during the fighting, along with his brother.

His death marked a significant setback for the Shamkhalate’s involvement in Kabardian politics and weakened its immediate capacity to shape events in the region through direct military intervention. Further evidence of losses sustained by the ruling house of the Shamkhalate during this period is preserved in epigraphic material from the cemetery of the Shamkhal clan in Gazi-Kumukh. Tombstone inscriptions record the deaths of two additional sons of Amal-Muhammad—Buday-shamkhal and Surkhai—who are described as having been killed in “battle with the infidels” in 974 AH (1566–1567). This date corresponds chronologically with the construction of the first Russian fortress on the Terek River, an event that significantly altered the balance of power in the region. According to some researchers, these individuals likely died in attempts to hinder or resist the establishment of the Russian fortifications.

=== Temruqo's struggle for power ===
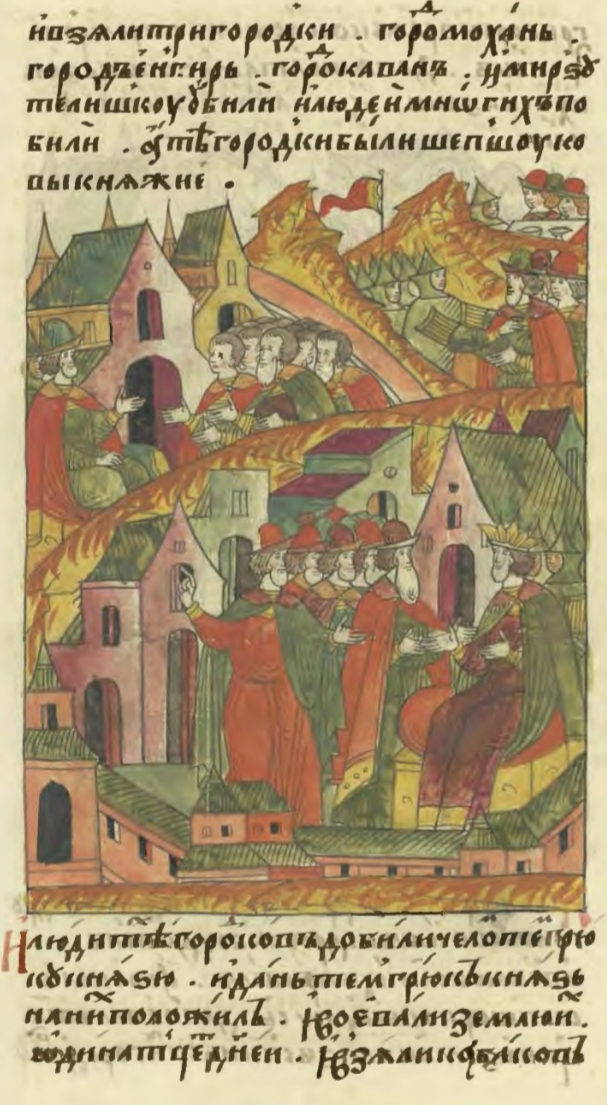
Subjugation of Pro-Crimean princes in Kabardia by Temruqo Idar

By 1562, rival political factions had emerged in Circassia, particularly over the question of foreign alliances. In 1563, several Circassian princes proposed to the Ottoman sultan joint military action against Astrakhan, with the aim of restoring it to Ottoman control. In 1565, envoys from the so-called “Mountain Circassians” arrived in Bakhchisarai and repeated the same proposal.

Nevertheless, when the Crimean Khanate and the Ottoman Empire launched a campaign against Astrakhan, the western Circassians refused to take part in it. In response, the Crimean Khanate sent a punitive expedition against the Circassians. However, according to a report sent to Moscow by A. Nagoy, “the Circassians defeated the sons of the Tatar tsar,” and the Tatars paid a heavy price for the campaign.

Between 1563 and 1567, Kabardia was torn by armed conflict between the pro-Muscovite faction of Temruqo and an anti-Muscovite coalition led by Pshiapshoqo supported by the Crimean Khanate and the Lesser Nogai Horde.

In the years 1562 to 1563, Temruqo, relying on the assistance of Russian military units, carried out a series of major campaigns against Kabardian princes aligned with the Crimean Khanate, led by Pshiapshoqo Qeytuqo. These campaigns helped secure unobstructed connections between Kabardia and the Russian state with Georgia.

In 1563, Temruqo's opponents launched a large-scale offensive that forced him and his sons to flee to Astrakhan, but soon Ivan IV of Russia dispatched a Muscovite force of about a thousand men — Streltsy and Cossacks under Prince Ivan Dashkov — to restore him. With their help, Temruqo defeated his rivals and reclaimed his lands, forcing the anti-Muscovite princes to retreat.

Continued skirmishes through 1566–1567 followed, as Temruqo's enemies sought Crimean and Nogai assistance to counterbalance his growing strength, while he secured permanent Russian support through the construction of the Terek Fortress on the Terek River. Despite Crimean attempts under Devlet I Giray to intervene, their raids failed to dislodge Muscovite or Kabardian forces. By the end of 1567, Temruqo stood victorious — his alliance with Muscovy firmly established him as the dominant power in Kabardia and marked the beginning of enduring Russo-Circassian influence in the North Caucasus.

== Aftermath ==
The campaigns significantly altered the political balance in the central North Caucasus, weakening the influence of the Shamkhalate and disrupting existing tributary networks in regions such as Balkaria and Karachay. In the years following the campaigns, Kabardian authority expanded into the contested highland zones, consolidating Temruqo's dominance in the region.

The alliance between Kabardia and the Tsardom of Russia deepened further after the conclusion of the campaigns. Joint military initiatives continued, including operations directed against the Tyumen Khanate, whose ruler resisted the growing Russo-Kabardian presence. This culminated in the construction of the Terki fortress on the Terek River in 1588, marking a permanent Russian military foothold in the central Caucasus.

Subsequent campaigns against neighboring powers, particularly the Shamkhalate, met with mixed results, as local forces successfully repelled some incursions. Nevertheless, continued pressure from Russian and Kabardian forces led to the eventual conquest and annexation of the Tyumen Khanate by the Russian state in 1594.

Overall, the campaigns laid the groundwork for sustained Russo-Kabardian alliance and contributed to the long-term expansion of both Kabardian influence and Russian strategic presence in the North Caucasus.

== Sources ==
- Shikhaliev, Sh. (2024). "Confrontation between Shamkhalate and Kabarda in the 16th century (the issue of international relations in the North Caucasus)". Minbar. Islamic Studies (in Russian).
- Kotlyarov, Victor (2014). Загадки Кабардино-Балкарии (PDF) (in Russian). Nalchik.
- Akbiev, Arsen Soltanmuradovich (2015). "Соперничество кумыкских и кабардинских феодальных владетелей за гегемонию на Северо-Восточном Кавказе во 2-й половине XVI-1-й половине XVIII века". Известия СОИГСИ (in Russian).
