= Truso Travertines Natural Monument =

- IUCN category III (natural monument or feature)
- Truso Travertines Natural Monument

- Location within Georgia Location within Mtskheta-Mtianeti
- Location: Mtskheta-Mtianeti, Georgia
- Nearest city: Stepantsminda, village Keterisi
- Coordinates: 42°34.993′N 44°25.646′E
- Area: 0.04 km^{2} (0.015 sq mi)
- Website: Truso Travertines Natural Monument

Truso Travertines Natural Monument (Georgian: თრუსოს ტრავერტინი) is a calcareous sinter or tufa in Truso valley on the right bank of Terek river at 2093 meters above the sea level in Kazbegi Municipality, Georgia. It is located about 2 km from village Keterisi where local population lives only seasonally.

This limestone was formed when carbonate minerals precipitate out of ambient temperature water. Travertine in some places is covered with a thin layer of transparent water on the white surface of the slopes where intensive development process is still ongoing.

It is part of Kazbegi Protected Areas along with Kazbegi National Park and five Natural Monuments:

- Sakhizari Cliff,
- Abano Mineral Lake,
- Truso Travertine,
- Jvari Pass Travertine,
- Keterisi Mineral Vaucluse.

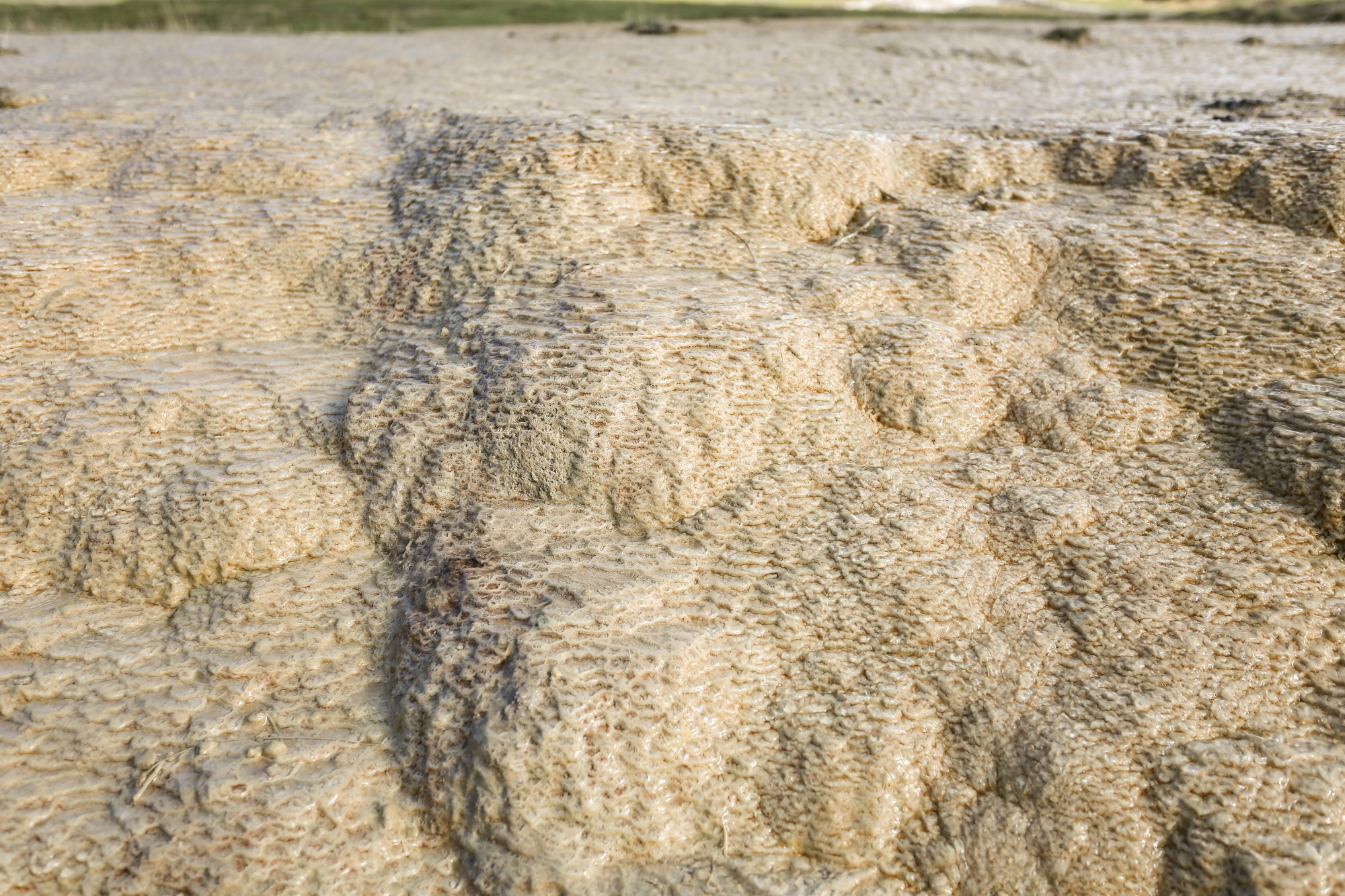
Truso travertine terraces.
