= Keterisi Mineral Vaucluse =

Keterisi Mineral Vaucluse Natural Monument
- IUCN category III (natural monument or feature)
- Location within Georgia Location within Mtskheta-Mtianeti
- Location: Mtskheta-Mtianeti, Georgia
- Nearest city: village Keterisi
- Coordinates: 42°35′47″N 44°23′59″E
- Area: 0.01 km^{2} (0.0039 sq mi)
- Website: Keterisi Mineral Vaucluse

Keterisi Mineral Vaucluse Natural Monument (Georgian: ქეთერისის მინერალური ვოკლუზი) is a cluster of powerful artesian aquifers pouring out mineral water at the foot of the Greater Caucasus, known as Narzan vaucluse: these mineral springs provide 25-30 million liters of hydrocarbonate-calcium water per day, (300-350 liters per second). It is the source of a stream with waterfalls in the village of Keterisi.

It is part of the Kazbegi Protected Areas along with Kazbegi National Park and five Natural Monuments:

- Sakhizari Cliff,
- Abano Mineral Lake,
- Truso Travertine,
- Jvari Pass Travertine,
- Keterisi Mineral Vaucluse.
