= Abano Mineral Lake Natural Monument =

Carbon dioxide effervescent lake in Kazbegi Municipality, Georgia

- IUCN category III (natural monument or feature)
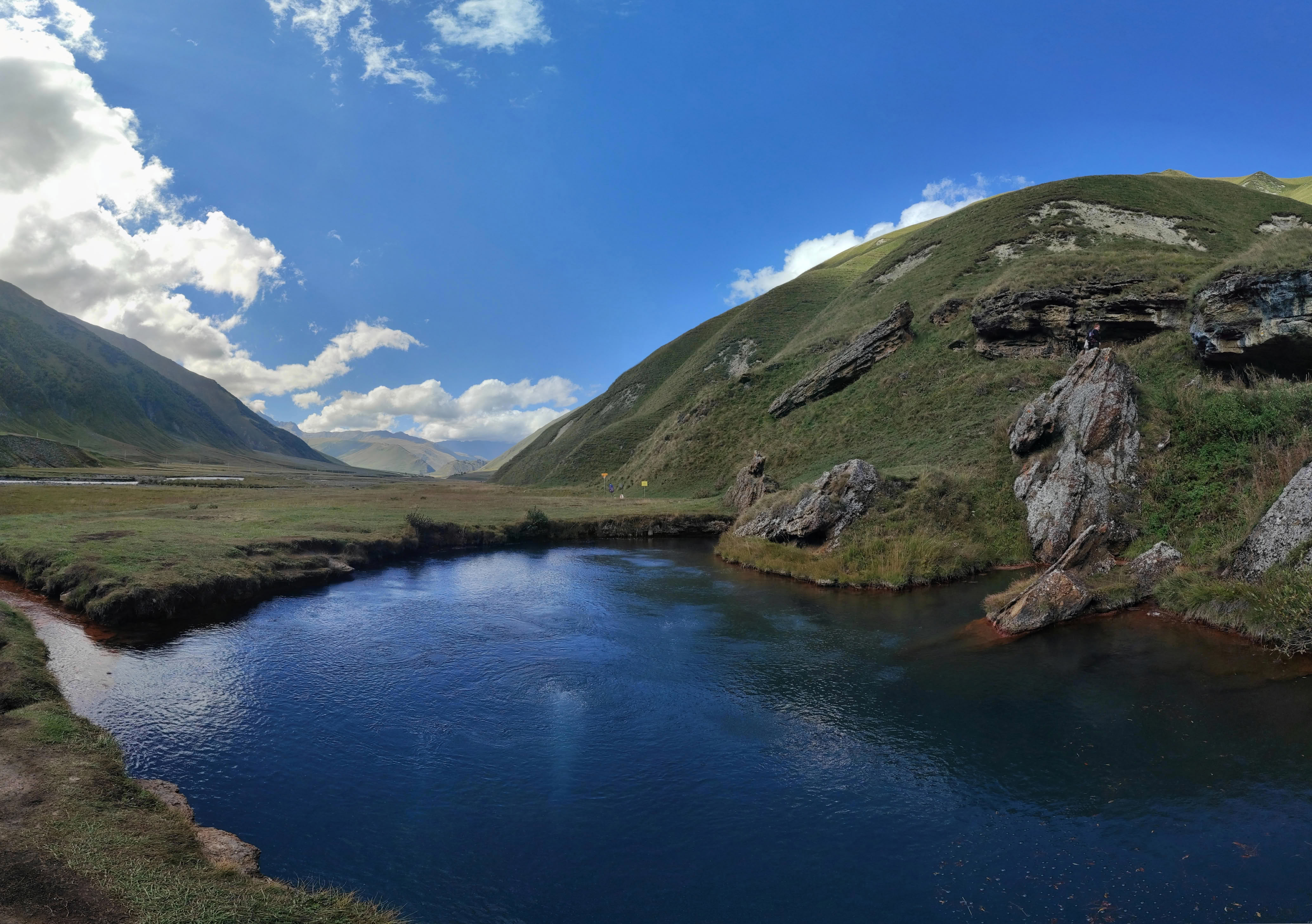
- Abano Mineral Lake Natural Monument
- Interactive map of Abano Mineral Lake Natural Monument
- Nearest city: village Kobi
- Coordinates: 42°35′17″N 44°25′19″E
- Area: 0.1 acres (0.040 ha)
- Website: Abano Mineral Lake Natural Monument

Abano Mineral Lake Natural Monument (Georgian: აბანოს მინერალური ტბა, romanized: abanos mineraluri t'ba) is a small karst lake in Kazbegi Municipality in Truso valley on the left bank of Terek River, to the east of the village Abano at 2,127 m above sea level.

== Lake characteristics ==
The lake was created by a carbon dioxide filled underground stream flowing to the surface through carbonate rocks from the late Jurassic period. The lake "boils" loudly with carbon dioxide bubbles bursting. The outflow of the stream is 2.5 million liters per 24 hours. The total surface area of the lake is 0.04 ha. The emission of gas in calm weather causes carbon dioxide to accumulate in lower levels. Small animals suffocate when they get near the lake, which is why there are dead animals there, such as mice, lizards, frogs and some birds.

It is part of Kazbegi Protected Areas along with Kazbegi National Park and five Natural Monuments:

- Sakhizari Cliff,
- Abano Mineral Lake,
- Truso Travertine,
- Jvari Pass Travertine,
- Keterisi Mineral Vaucluse.

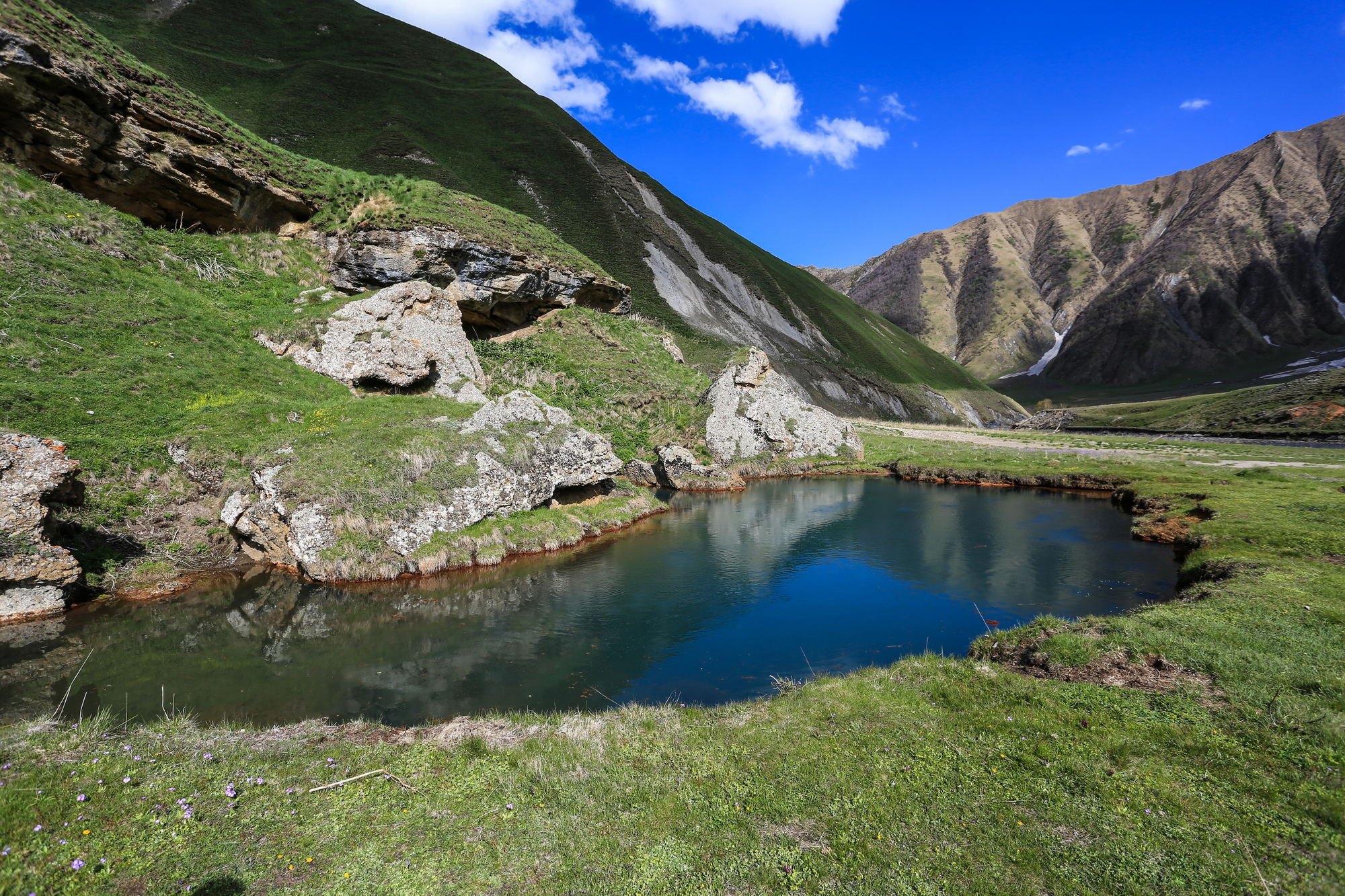
Abano Mineral Lake.

== See also ==
- List of natural monuments of Georgia
