= Ambush in Darial Gorge =

Darial Ambush
- Part of Kabardian–Ingush conflict
Date	Mid-16th century
Location	Darial Gorge
Result	Ingush-Kakhetian victory (Note: Ingush legends suggest a Kabardian warrior stated as: "If it weren't for those sitting beyond the river, (Georgians) your victory would not have happened!")

Belligerents
(Ingushetia) Ingush Societies; Kingdom of Kakheti	Kabardia (East Circassia)

Commanders and leaders
(Ingushetia) Cha Eala (Ingushetia) Cherbazh Eala; Levan of Kakheti	Asakhmet Asekhu †

Strength
(Ingushetia) 14 (Note: Cherbazh, Cha, and 12 sons of Cherbazh.); Unknown (Note: Must be comparable to the Kabardian forces, as the legend Makhinan suggests the Georgian forces "besieged the Kabardians", which numbered more than 50 warriors.)	More than 50

Casualties and losses
None	About 50 killed or ran away

The Ambush in the Darial Gorge is a 16th-century engagement described in Ingush oral tradition, in which the brothers Cha and Cherbazh are said to have destroyed a Kabardian raiding party in the Darial Gorge. The episode is preserved in ethnographic records collected in the late 19th and early 20th centuries.

This event is folkloric and is based on Ingush oral tradition, it is not recorded in any contemporary historical sources.

== Historical Context ==
Based on references to King Levan of Kakheti (r. 1518-1574), who is said to have granted the brothers land following the event, the narrative is generally placed in the mid-16th century.

The story recounts two brothers, Cha and Cherbazh, from the village of Erzi. While hunting in the upper Darial Gorge, Cherbazh reportedly experienced a supernatural warning from an elderly figure dressed in white, who appeared to him in a dream and warned of an approaching band of raiders. After repeated visions, the brothers prepared for battle. They set two ambush positions in a narrow section of the gorge. One above and one below the path. The brothers are said to have destroyed the entire raiding party, sparing only one survivor in order to spread word of their victory.

== Aftermath ==
News of the destruction of the raiders reached the Georgian royal authorities, which had previously been unable to suppress the group. In recognition of their actions, King Levan of Kakheti granted Cha the lands along the Kistinka Gorge and Cherbazh the territory surrounding present-day Gveleti.

Late 19th-century accounts describe Gveleti as a former Georgian frontier settlement, where Ingush from the village of Erzi were granted lands by the Georgian kings in order to secure the northern border of the kingdom against raids from Kabardian and Ossetian groups. These lands extended toward Mount Kazbek and the Terek River.

According to Bersnako Gazikov, the settlement described in Russian reports from 1589 as "Cherebashev tavern" in Gveleti derived its name from Cherbazh after his conflict with the Kabardians.

Taverns of northeast Caucasus, "Cherebashev's Kabaki (tavern)" located in bottom left of the map.
