= Sakhizari Cliff Natural Monument =

Complex geologic structure in Georgia

- IUCN category III (natural monument or feature)
- Sakhizari Cliff Natural Monument

- Location within Georgia Location within Mtskheta-Mtianeti
- Nearest city: Stepantsminda, village Sioni
- Coordinates: 42°34.279′N 44°33.299′E
- Area: 3.36 km^{2} (1.30 sq mi)
- Website: სახიზარის კლდის ბუნების ძეგლი

Sakhizari Cliff Natural Monument (Georgian: სახიზარის კლდის ბუნების ძეგლი) is a complex geologic structure that was formed due to abundant rainfall causing erosion of the volcanic mountain Khabarjina. Local population call this place "the ruins of the rocks" and in the past centuries at wartime villagers would seek refuge by climbing the cliffs when the enemy approached.

Scenic cliffs are located in Kazbegi Municipality in river Terek Gorge near village Sioni at 3136 meters above sea level.

It is part of Kazbegi Protected Areas along with Kazbegi National Park and five Natural Monuments:

- Sakhizari Cliff,
- Abano Mineral Lake,
- Truso Travertine,
- Jvari Pass Travertine,
- Keterisi Mineral Vaucluse.
