= Cave of Bethlehem =

Cave in the country of Georgia

- ბეთლემის გამოქვაბული
- Location within Mtskheta-Mtianeti Location within Georgia
- Location: Mount Kazbek, Mtskheta-Mtianeti, Georgia
- Coordinates: 42°43′02″N 44°30′30″E
- Discovery: 1947-1948
- Geology: andesite formations

The cave of Bethlehem (Georgian: ბეთლემის გამოქვაბული) is a cave of Georgia, located in Mount Kazbek, at an altitude of approximately 4100 m above sea level. The entrance is exposed on a cliff of andesite reddish (at a height of about 300–400 m above the base of the rock). The cave of Bethlehem is mentioned by Vakhushti Batonishvili in his work Description of the Kingdom of Georgia.

== History ==
The first mention of the cave that contains a Georgian chronicle Kartlis Tskhovreba, according to which a hundred young people of Khevsian soldiers hid, of the soldiers of Timur Leng who approached them, in this cave of the treasure of the Queen Tamara of Georgia and for fear of secret disclosure, they killed each other.

According to a group of researchers, the most recent visitors had left the cave temple about 100 years ago. Not far from the cave, the monks' cells, a tombstone, a stone cross, and a pillar were found carved into the rock. These findings led to the conclusion that the cave was the oldest and tallest "temple of Christians in a mountain cave" in the world, and that the monastic complex dates from the 6th to 7th centuries.

== Cave discovery ==
In his diary entries, mountaineer Levan Sudzhashvili in 1947 noted that he saw a cave with an iron gate and a descending chain in a rock northeast of the top of Kazbek. In January 1948, a group of mountaineers led by Alexandra Dzhaparidze explored the cave, finding a 5.5-meter long hanging metal chain at the entrance. The cave had a dome-shaped vault, rounded walls and a paved floor with square tiles. The altar of the church, the utensils of the medieval church, the banner of the church, dating from the X-XI centuries, coins of the XV-XVIII century and other articles were found.

== Literature ==
Georgian Soviet Encyclopedia, Vol. 2, p. 268, Tb., 1977. Giaparides A. W., Tannick Pigeon Bethlehem, Jr. :: The Poorest Versus, M., 1948.
