= Jvari Pass Travertine Natural Monument =

Natural monument in Georgia

Jvari Pass Travertine
- IUCN category III (natural monument or feature)
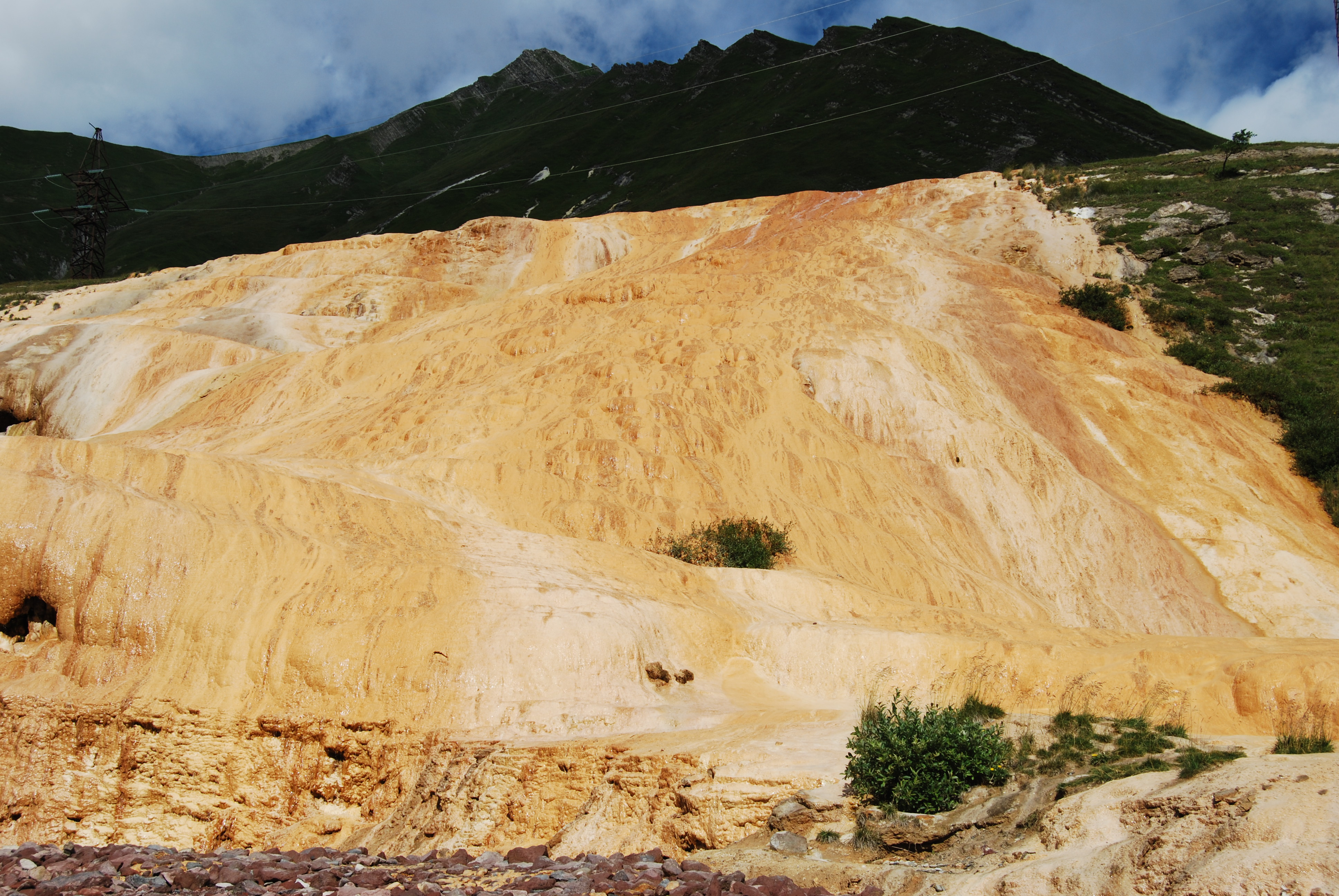
- Travertine near Stepantsminda route at 2197 meters above the sea level.

- Location within Georgia Location within Mtskheta-Mtianeti
- Nearest city: Gudauri
- Coordinates: 42°31.913′N 44°28.325′E
- Area: 0.03 km^{2} (0.012 sq mi)
- Website: ჯვრის ურელტეხილის ტრავერტინი

Jvari Pass Travertine Natural Monument (Georgian: ჯვრის უღელტეხილის ტრავერტინი) is calcareous sinter or tufa in Baidara River valley on the left bank of the road tunnel of the Kobi-Gudauri motorway at 2197 meters above the sea level in Kazbegi Municipality, Georgia.

This limestone was formed when carbonate minerals precipitate out of ambient temperature water. Travertine in some places is covered with a thin layer of transparent water on the white surface of the slopes where the intensive development process is still ongoing. It is part of Kazbegi Protected Areas along with Kazbegi National Park and five Natural Monuments:

- Sakhizari Cliff,
- Abano Mineral Lake,
- Truso Travertine,
- Jvari Pass Travertine,
- Keterisi Mineral Vaucluse.

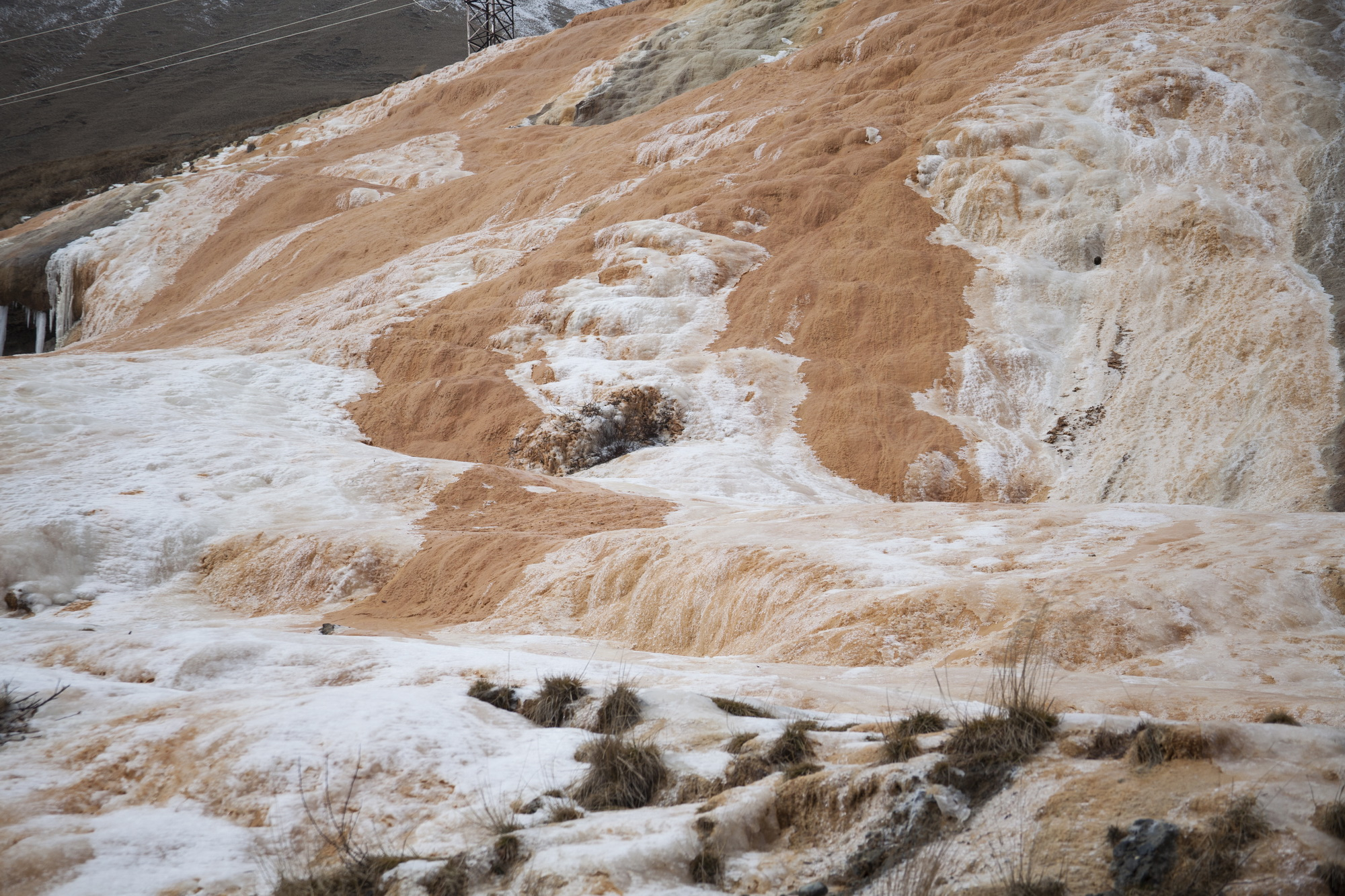
Jvari Pass Travertine Natural Monument
