= Gveleti =

Gveleti Gelatĕ
- Village
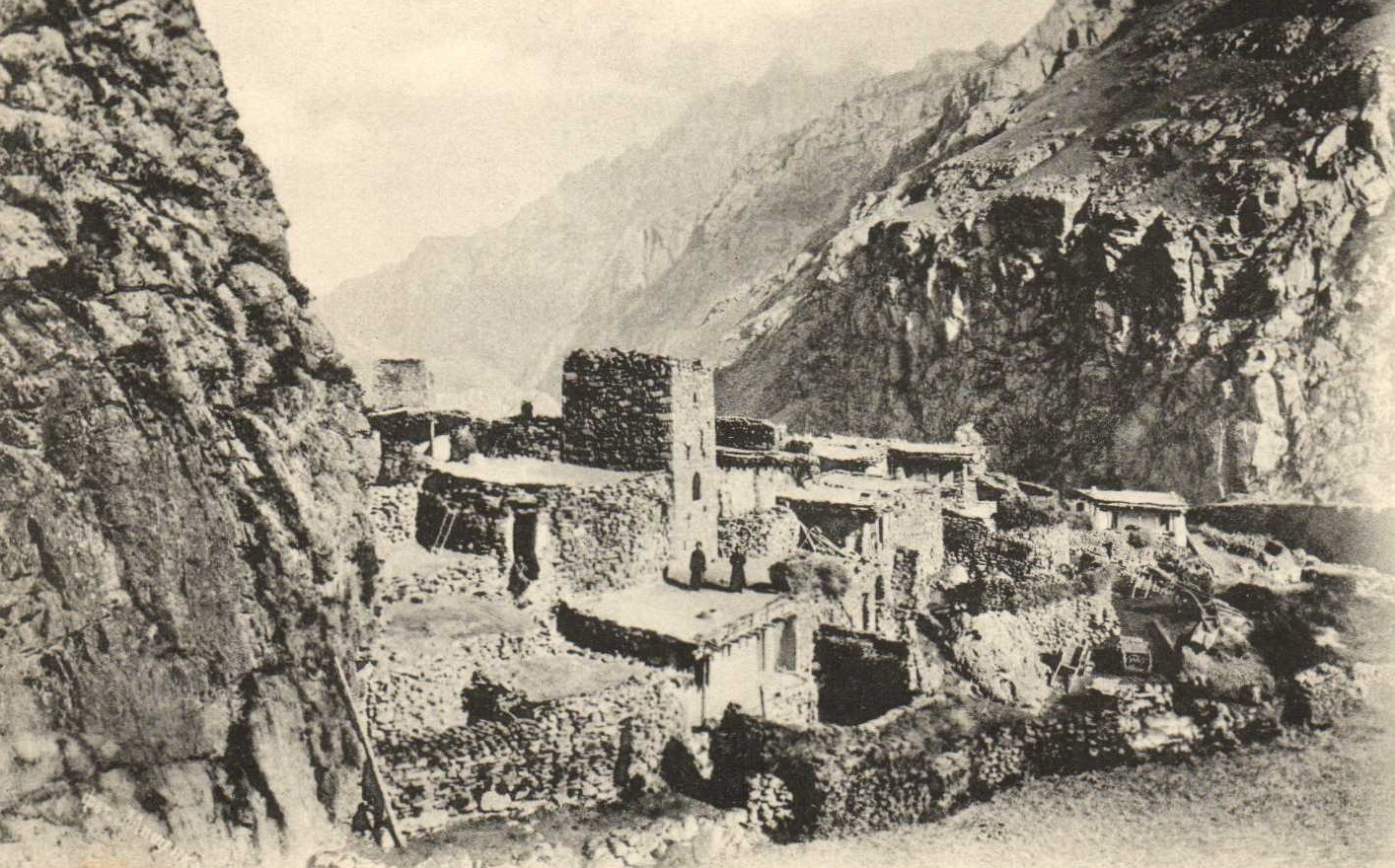
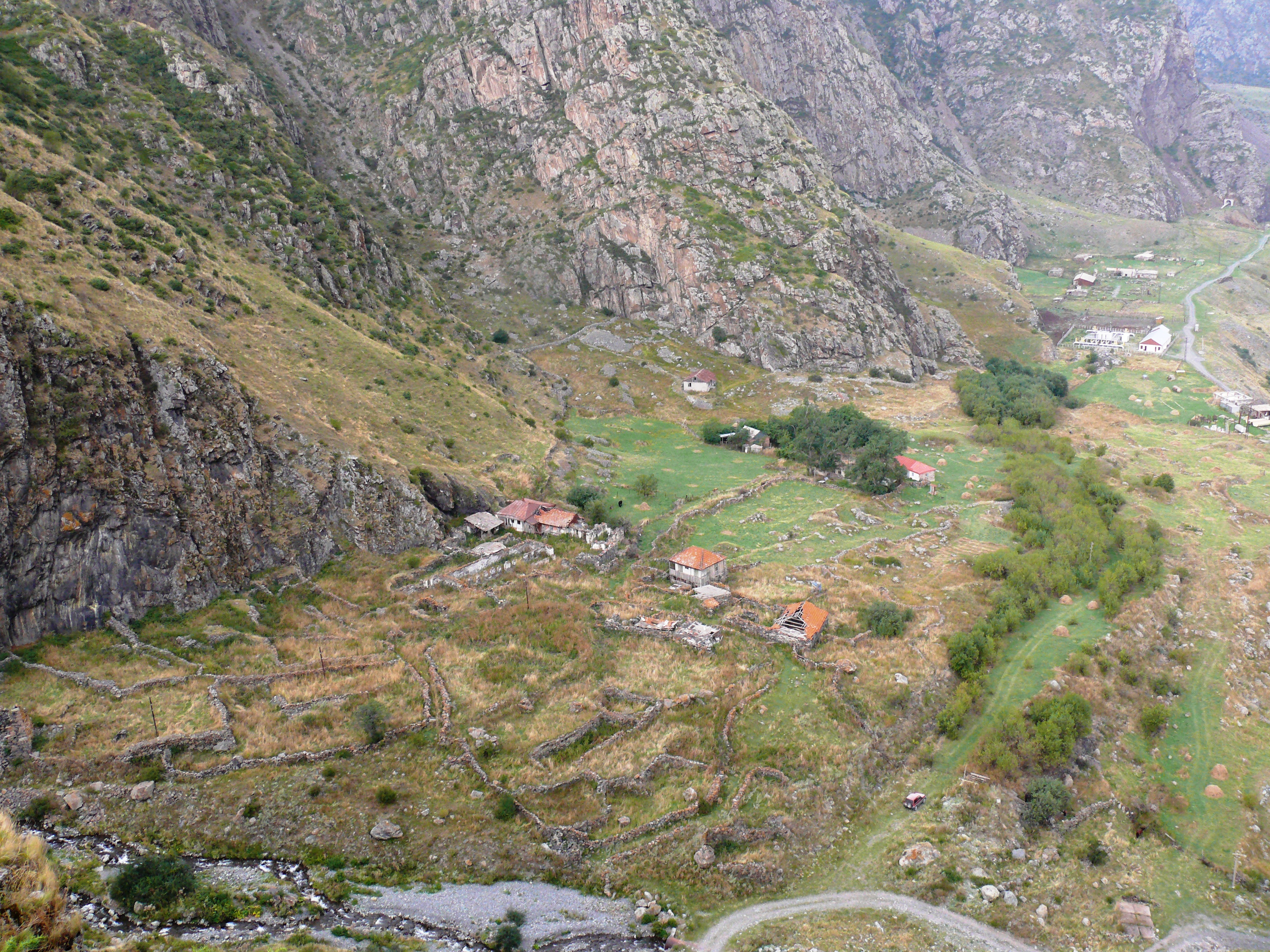
- View of Gveleti: 1902 and 2010

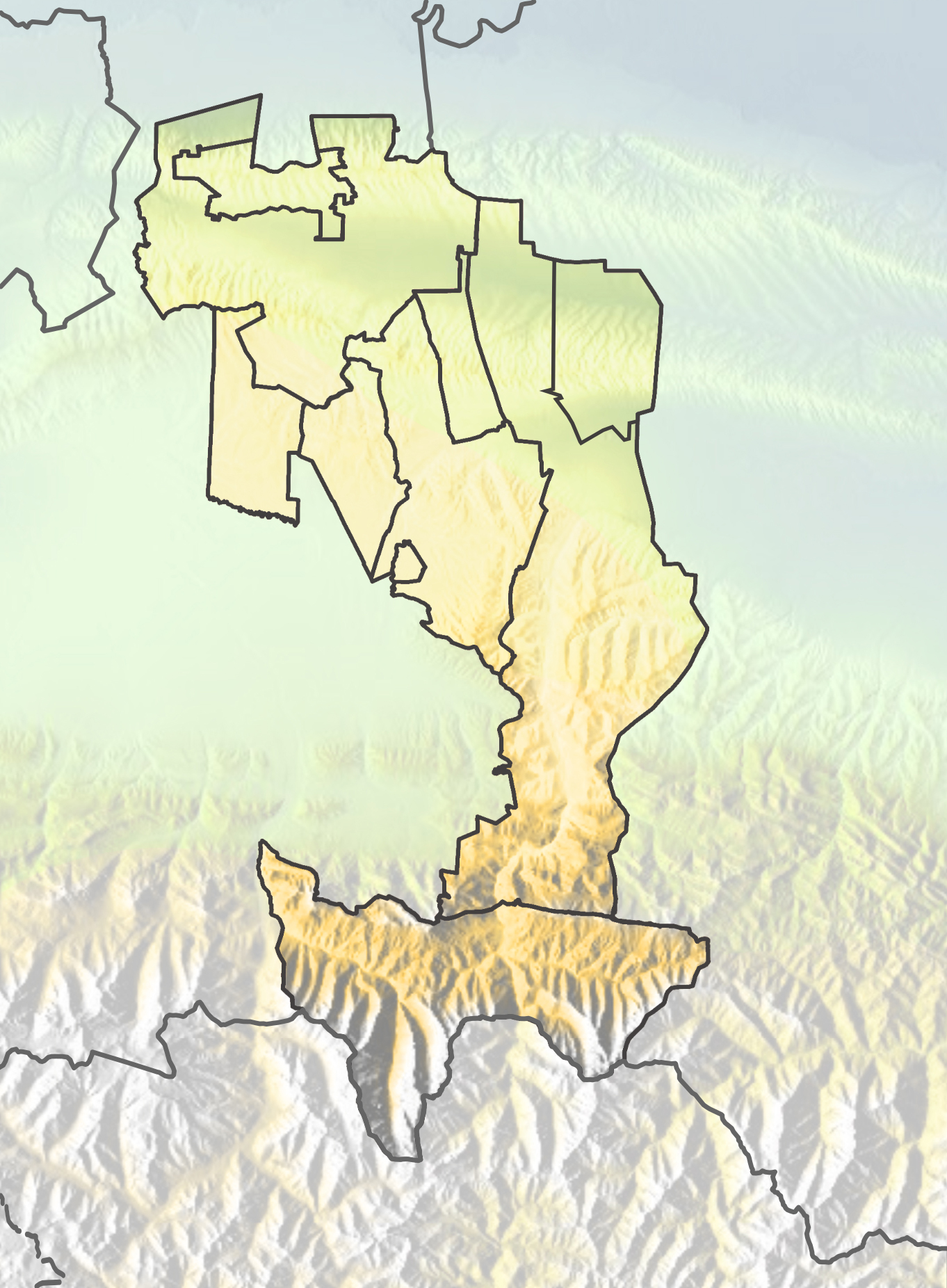
- Location within Georgia Location within Republic of Ingushetia Location within Mtskheta-Mtianeti
- Coordinates: 42°42′26″N 44°37′25″E
- Country: Georgia
- Mkhare: Mtskheta-Mtianeti
- Municipality: Kazbegi
- Elevation: 1,560 m (5,120 ft)

Population (2014)
  - Total: 2
- Time zone: UTC+4 (Georgian Time)

Gveleti (Note: also Gvileti, Guleti or Gilatĕ.) (Georgian: გველეთი; Ingush: Гелате, romanized: Gelatĕ) is a village (aul) in the Kazbegi Municipality of Georgia. It is located in the Darial Gorge, on the right bank of the Devdaraki (a left tributary of the Terek river), 4 km from the border with Russia. Gelatĕ was founded by the Ingush clan (teip) Gelatkhoy (Ingush: Гелатхой).

== History ==
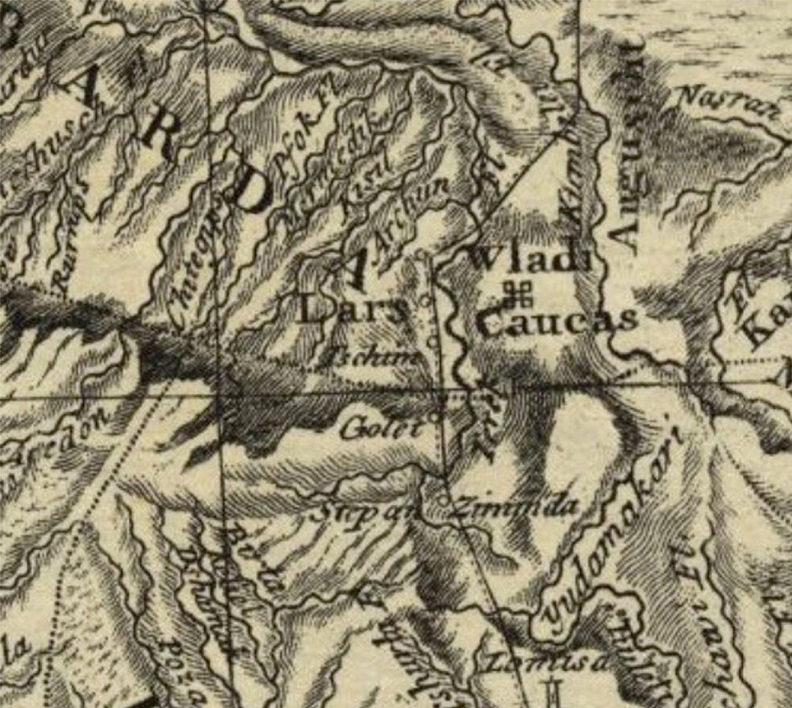
Gelatĕ (Golet) on Güldenstädt's map (1780)

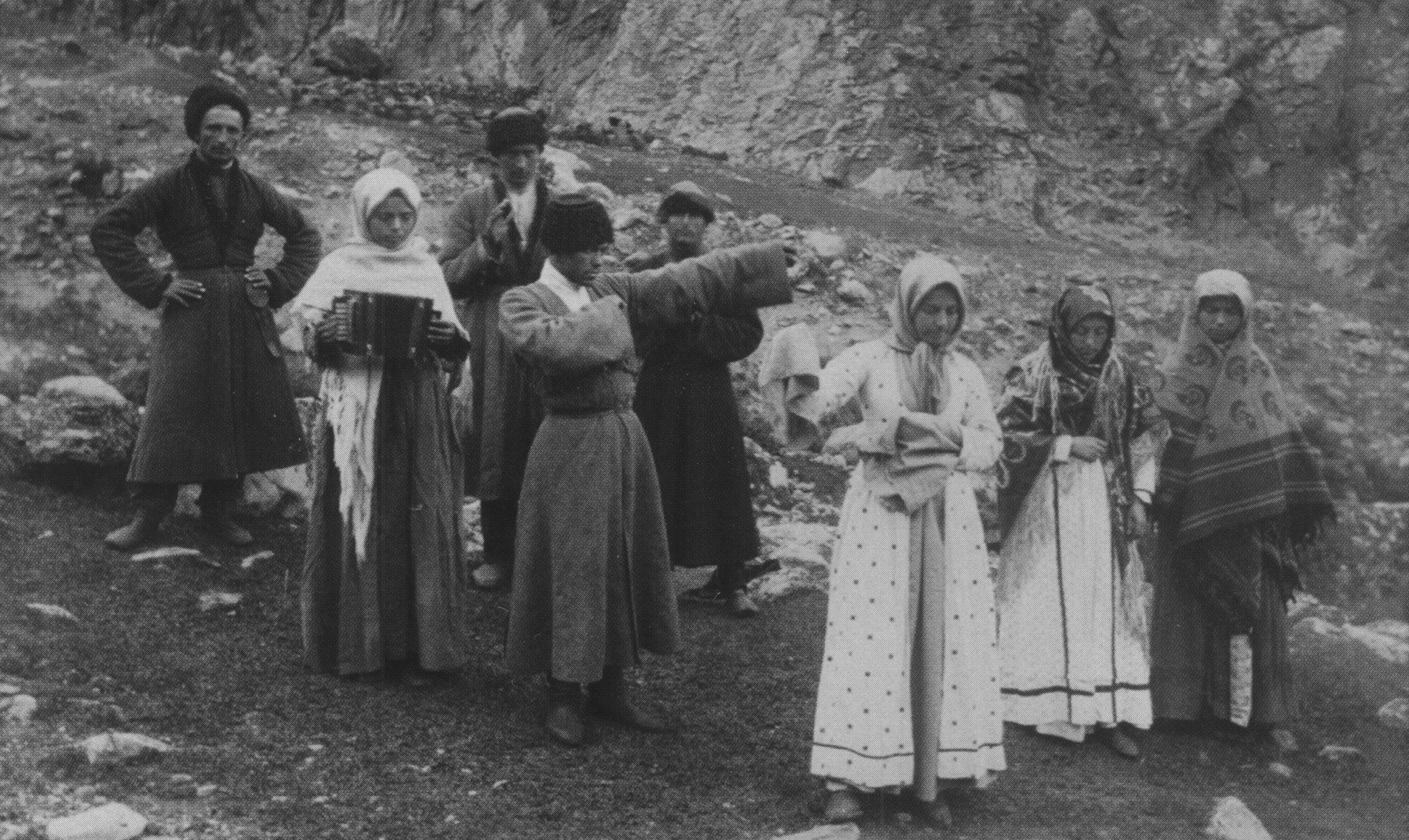
Ingush dance in Gveleti (ca. 1880)

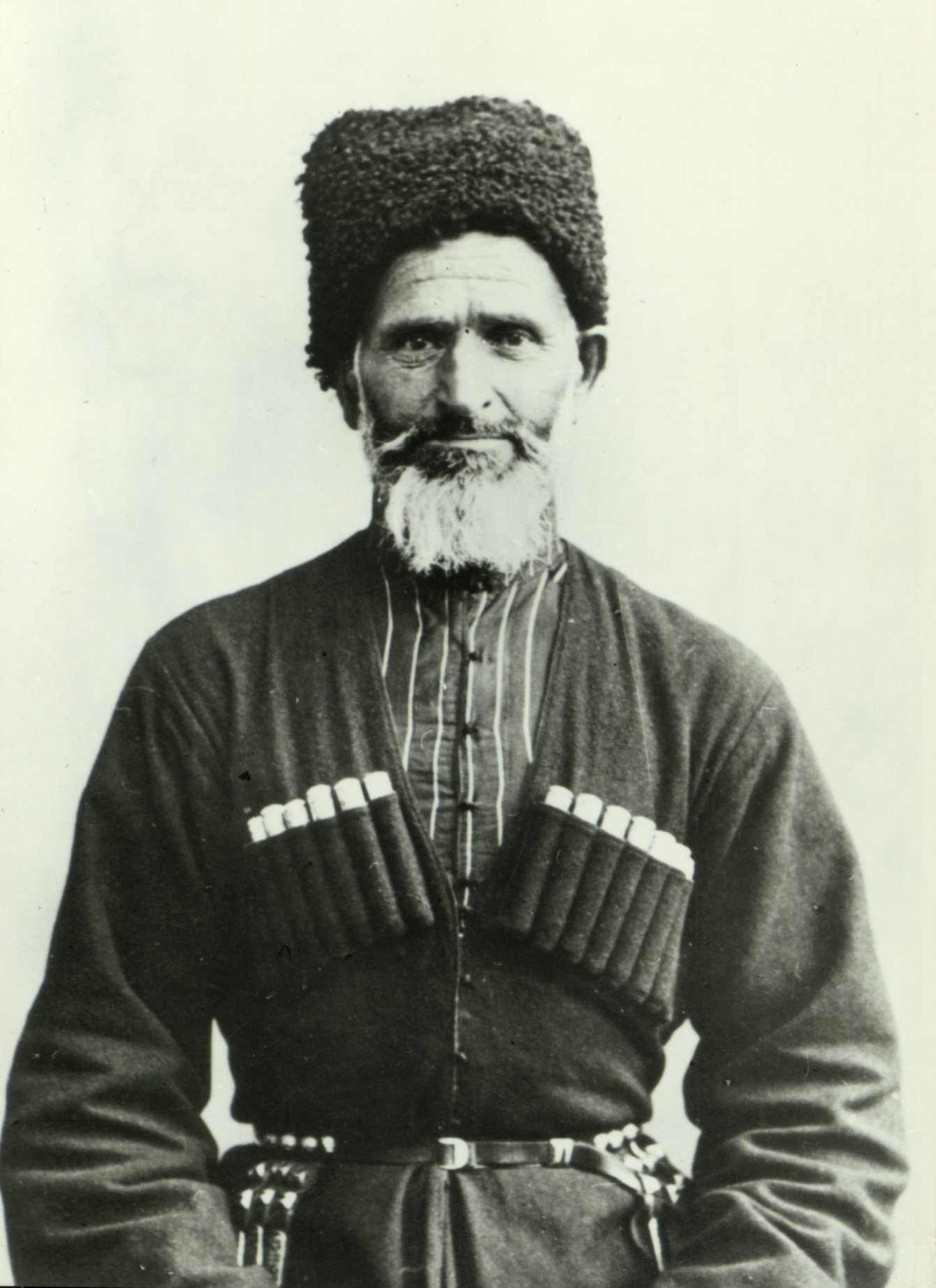
Tsogol Buzurtanov - alpinist, son of Yosif Buzurtanov - the first to conquer Mount Kazbek. Inhabitant of Gveleti.

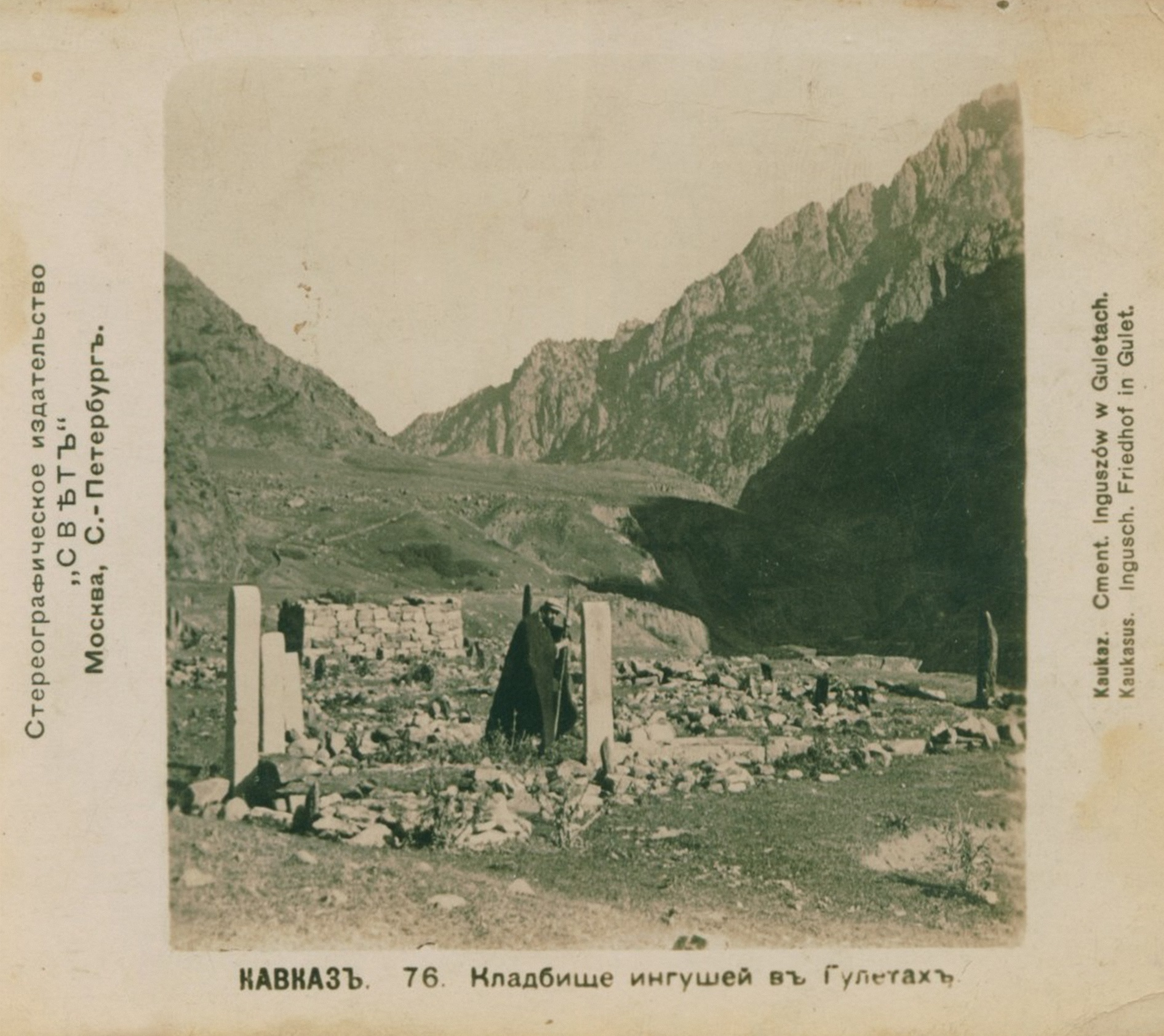
Ingush cemetery in Gveleti (1910)

The first mention of Gveleti occurred in the document «Gergetis sulta matiane» dating to the 15th century. In Russian documents the village is first mentioned in 1589 in the Ambassadorial Orders under the name "Cherebashev kabak" (settlement), named after the elder of the Ingush village — Cherbash (Ingush: ЧӀербаж). During the passage of the Russian embassy led by S. Zvenigorodsky and T. Antonov through the territory of the Ingush to Georgia in September 1589, the rains washed away the last bridge across the river on the border with Georgia, and the embassy was forced to ask for help from local residents. They were in need of wood to repair the bridge as was documented: “the ambassadors, Prince Semyon and Deacon Torkh, at the Cherebashov kabak, spend a day for the bridge”.

The Cherebashev settlement was located on the site of the Ingush village of Gvileti in the Darial Gorge. According to Ingush historical legends, the ancestors of the Cherbizhev's (Чербижевы) lived along the areas of the Georgian Military Road. In one of these legends, written down by B.K. Dalgat, it is said that Cherbizh (Чербыш) and the inhabitants of Gvileti managed to defeat the army of the Kabardian knyaz, which was marching on Tiflis. In gratitude for this, the Georgian king George presented Cherbizh with land from Kazbeki to Gvileti.

Historically Gveleti was part of the Metskhalin society, also known as the Kistin or Fyappiy society.

== Geography ==
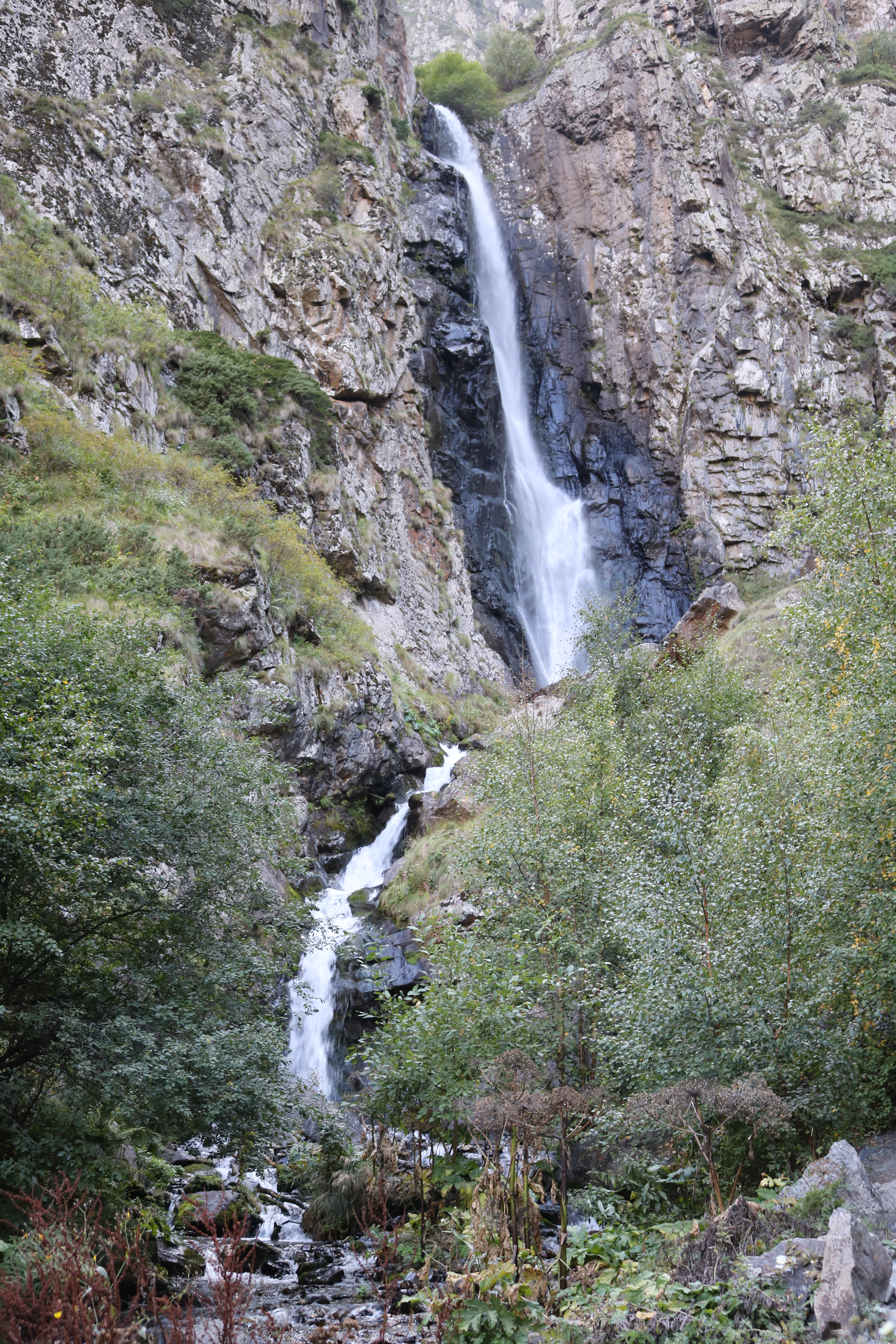
Gveleti Waterfall

Gveleti is located 1560 meters above sea level, 9 kilometers from Stepantsminda. It is the first residential settlement after the Dariali Border Checkpoint. The Geveleti waterfalls can be found near the village; the water from the bigger one cascades from a small river called Gveletistskali. The force of the stream has carved out a bowl-shaped depression in the rock, which makes the waterfall very beautiful. Not far from the Gveleti Big Waterfall there is a smaller waterfall and a lake; together these natural objects form a single complex. The Gveleti Small Waterfall is located closer to the village. The height of the Gveleti Big Waterfall reaches up to 25 meters. The width of the water flow reaches 4 meters, and the width of the top is 2 meters.

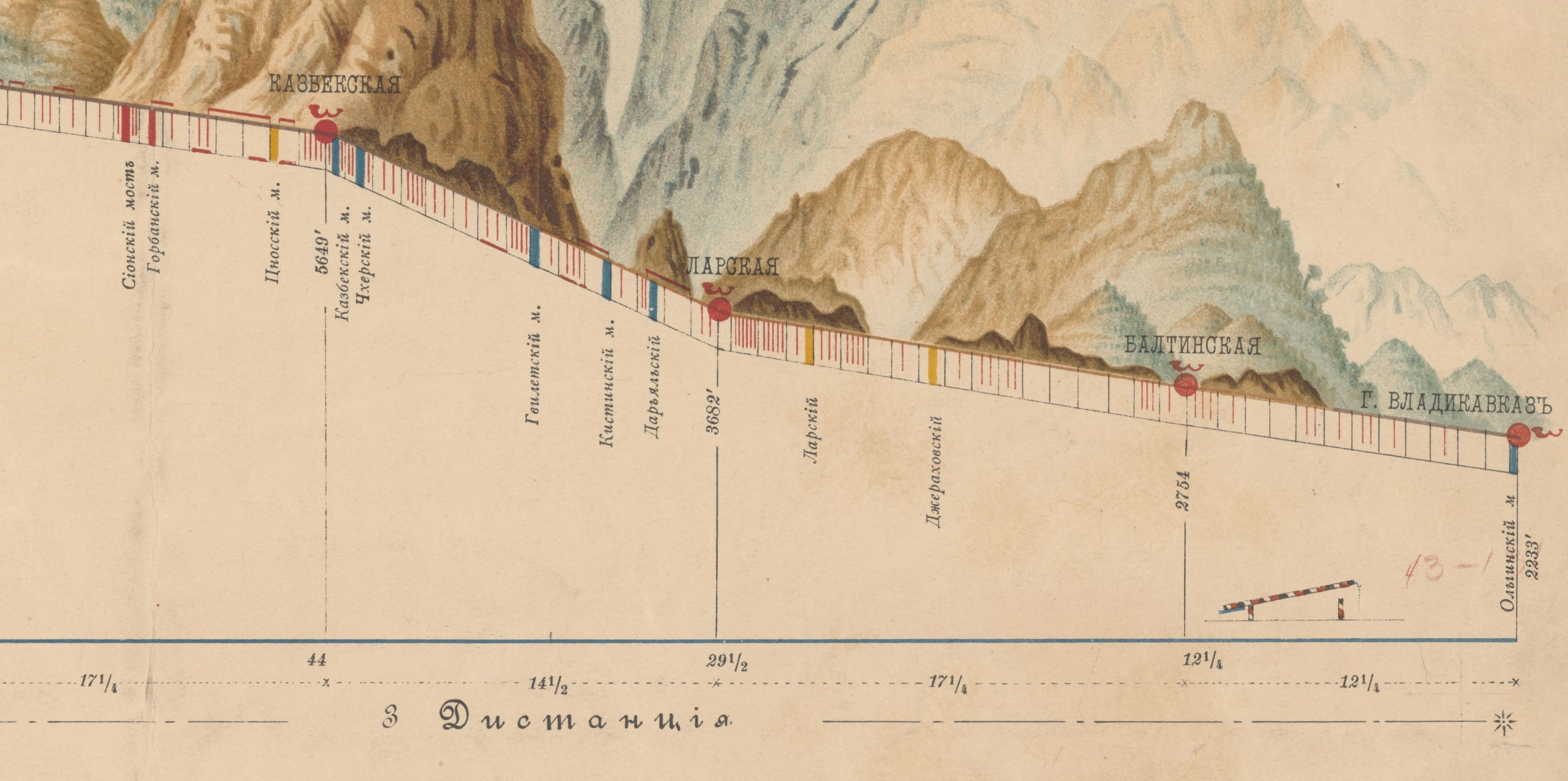
Gvileti (Гвилецкiй) and Kistin (Кистинскiй) bridges on a longitudinal profile map of the Georgian Military Road (late XIX century)

Behind the Gveleti Bridge there is a deep but short gorge, at the end of which a mountain stream, originating between the Arch-kort and Sarcevis ridges, falls in two cascades from a height of just over 20 meters. The distance from the Gveleti Bridge to the waterfall is 0,75 km with a large climb.

== Bibliography ==
- Волкова, Н.Г. (1973). Этнонимы и племенные названия Северного Кавказа [Ethnonyms and tribal names of the North Caucasus] (in Russian). Moscow: Наука.
- Волкова, Н.Г. (1974). Этнический состав населения Северного Кавказа в XVIII — начале XX в. [Ethnic composition of the population of the North Caucasus from the 18th to early 20th century] (in Russian). Moscow: Наука.
- Вильямс, А. К. (1928). Географический очерк Ингушетии [Geographical essay of Ingushetia] (in Russian). Владикавказ: Отдел народного образования Ингушской Автономной Области. pp. 1–128.
- Арджеванидзе, И.А. (1954). Военно-грузинская дорога: Краеведческий очерк с приложением схематической карты маршрута и библиографии [Georgian Military Road: Local history essay with the appendix of a schematic map of the route and bibliography] (in Russian). Tbilisi: Госиздат Грузинской ССР. pp. 1–250.
- Дахкильгов, Ш.Э. (1989). Слово о родном крае (Записки краеведа) [A word about the native land (Notes of a local historian)] (in Russian). Grozny: Чеч.-Инг. кн. изд-во. pp. 1–149. ISBN 5-7666-0023-2.
