= Mount Khabarjina =

Mountain in Georgia

Coordinates: 42°34′16″N 44°33′17″E

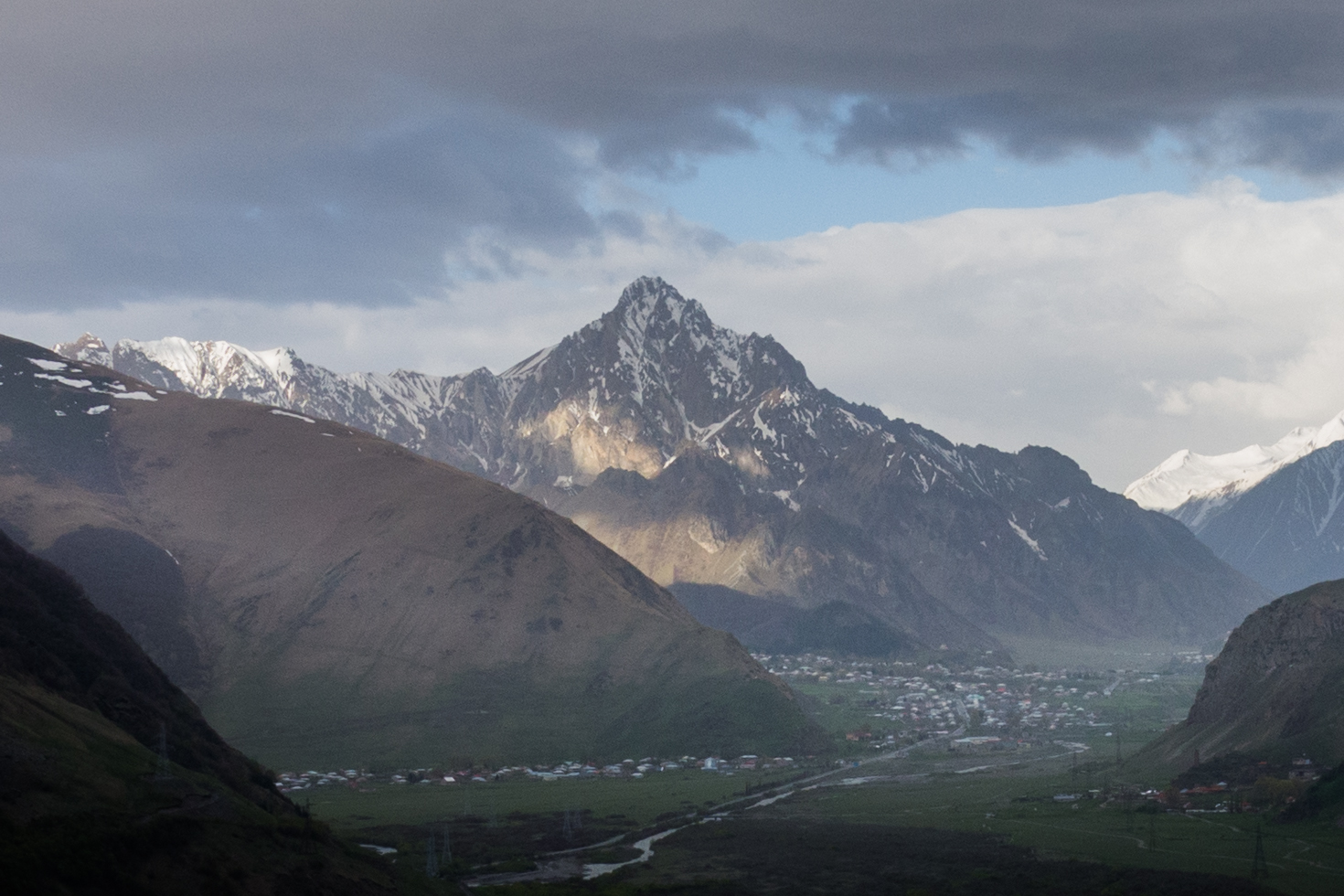
- The view of Khabarjina from Stepantsminda

Highest point
- Elevation: 3,142 m (10,308 ft)

Geography
- Location within Caucasus Mountains Location within Mtskheta-Mtianeti
- Location: Georgia
- Parent range: Caucasus Mountains

Mount Khabarjina (Georgian: ქაბარჯინა, Iron Ossetic: Къæбырджын) is a mountain and dormant volcano in the Caucasus of Georgia. It has an elevation of 3,142 metres. It is located near Mount Kazbek and is a part of its volcanic group. It is better known under the name Mount Kabardzhin.

== See also ==
- Sakhizari Cliff Natural Monument
