= Devdaraki =

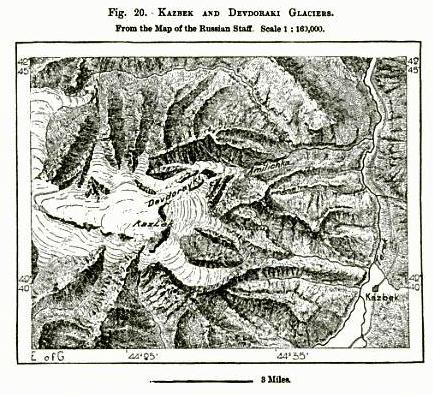
- Map of 1891 with mount Kazbek and Devdoraki glacier marked.

- Location within Mtskheta-Mtianeti Location within Georgia
- Interactive map of Devdaraki
- Type: Valley glacier
- Location: Georgia
- Coordinates: 42°42′33″N 44°31′55″E
- Area: 7.13 km^{2} (1,762 acres)
- Length: 5.5 km (3 miles)

Devdaraki (Georgian: დევდარაკი) is a valley glacier located on the northeastern slope of Mt. Kazbek. The length of the glacier is 5.5 km (3.4 mi) and its surface area is 7.13 km^{2} (2.75 sq mi). The tongue of the Devdaraki Glacier descends to 2,300 metres (7,500 ft) above sea level. Devdaraki is known for its intense surging properties that have caused significant destruction in the past (particularly from the late 18th to the late 19th centuries). The glacier surges have led to catastrophic mudflows in the Dariali Gorge which have, on several occasions damaged the Georgian Military Highway. A massive collapse of the glacier on August 20, 2014, led to the death of seven people. The Devdaraki Glacier is the source of the River Kabakhi (left tributary of the Terek River).

== See also ==
- Glaciers of Georgia
