= Yosif Buzurtanov =

18th-century Georgian mountaineeer

Personal information
- Nationality: Ingush
- Born: Gveleti
- Occupations: Hunter, Mountaineer

Climbing career
- Known for: First ascent of Mount Kazbek

Yosif Buzurtanov (Russian: Йосиф Бузуртанов), was an Ingush mountaineer and hunter, who was also called Yosif the Mokhevian, (Note: "Mokheves" or "Mokhevians" is an old Georgian term used to refer to the peoples living in Khevi.) and was the first person to ascend Mount Kazbek in the Caucasus, which he did in the second half of the 18th century. Buzurtanov lived in the medieval village (aul) Gveleti (Ingush: Gelatĕ), the abode of the Ingush clan Gelatkhoy.

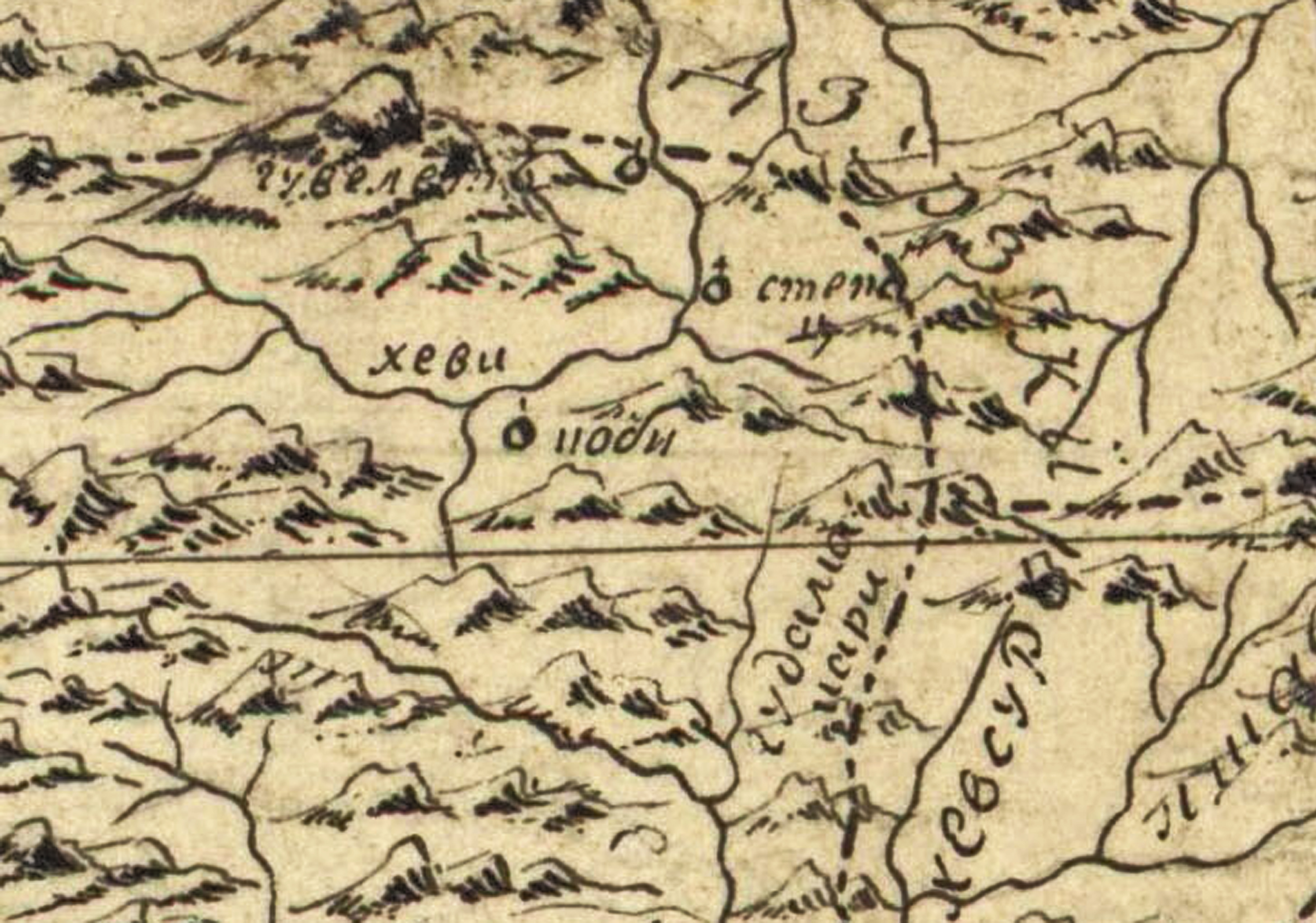
Aul Gveleti, indicated near the foot of Mount Kazbek on a 1784 map.

== History ==
Prince Ioane of Georgia, in his manuscript Kalmasoba, mentions Yosif as the first to ascend the mountain peak of Kazbek in the late eighteenth century during the reign of Heraclius II of Georgia.

Associate Professor Yakov Frolov, a member of the Russian Mountain Society in Pyatigorsk, chronciled that the first climber to the top of mountain was Yosif Buzurtanov. Frolov conducted a survey among the centenarians of various regions adjacent to Kazbek. Residents of the Ingush foothill village of Akhki-Yurt (located in modern-day Prigorodny district) claimed that Yosif, a native of the village of Gveleti, was the first to climb to the top of Mount Kazbek. The 20th-century Georgian mountaineer, Yagor Kazalikashvili, also said that "the pioneer was an Ingush hunter from Gveleti who was looking for the treasure of Queen Tamara", a rumor which had long existed among local mountaineers.

The first documented attempts to conquer Mount Kazbek were made by German travelers Moritz von Engelhardt and Friedrich Parrot in 1811, but they ended in failure. The next attempt was made in August 1844 by professor Friedrich Kolenati, who was guided by local Gveletians. But this expedition did not reach the summit.

In 1868, Kazbek was officially conquered by English climbers Douglas Freshfield, Adolphus Moore, Charles Tucker and French guide François Devouassoud. Success was achieved thanks to both their equipment and the fact that they were accompanied by experienced guides from the Gveleti village, Tsogol Buzurtanov (son of Yosif Buzurtanov), Toto Oziev, Anzor Doskhoev and another Gveletian, whose name is unknown. In 1873, Tsogol Buzurtanov again conquered Kazbek, with Vladimir Kozmin, the first Russian climber to climb the peak, and 3 Ingush guides from Gveleti, including Tsogol Buzurtanov's son Isak. When Tsogol Buzurtanov was asked who taught him mountaineering techniques, Tsogol answered: "My father, who climbed to the top of Bashloam to find the treasure stored there".

Tsogols Buzurtanovs had five sons Mussa, Yani, Isak, Inarko and Abzi. In 1901, Alexander Sipiagin wrote about the Buzurtanov brothers: "All the brothers are excellent walkers, and have been to the top of Kazbek; Isaac has already been 4 times. They can make excellent guides". In 1902, the Russian Mountain Society introduced special diplomas and badges for its guides. Among the first seven to whom they were awarded were three of Yosif's grandchildren, Yani, Musa and Isak. In 1944, the Buzurtanovs, like the entire Ingush people, were deported to Kazakhstan and Central Asia. After returning from exile, of all the descendants of the five brothers, except Inarko's son, Yakub, and grandson, Yani-Girey, returned to Gveleti, but didn't live there long, and moved to the Prigorodny district. Thus ended the history of the dynasty of Ingush mountain climbers.

== See also ==
- Gveleti

== Sources ==
- Арджеванидзе, И.А. (1954). Военно-грузинская дорога: Краеведческий очерк с приложением схематической карты маршрута и библиографии [Georgian Military Road: Local history essay with the appendix of a schematic map of the route and bibliography] (in Russian). Tbilisi: Госиздат Грузинской ССР. pp. 1–250.
- Анисимов, С.С. (1928). От Казбека к Эльбрусу [From Kazbek to Elbrus] (in Russian). Moscow-Leningrad. pp. 7–64.
- Дахкильгов, Ш.Э. (1989). Слово о родном крае (Записки краеведа) [A word about the native land (Notes of a local historian)] (in Russian). Grozny: Чеч.-Инг. кн. изд-во. pp. 1–149. ISBN 5-7666-0023-2.
- Газиков, Б.Д. (2015). Гилате: сборник материалов) [Gilate: collection of materials] (in Russian). Nalchik: Тетраграф. pp. 1–483. ISBN 978-5-00066-063-8.
- Абу Гадаборщев (2009). "Покорители Казбека" [Conquerors of the Kazbek]. vestikavkaza.ru.
