= Abano Pass =

Mountain pass in Georgia

- Abano Pass

- Location within Caucasus Mountains Location within Georgia
- Interactive map of Abano Pass
- Elevation: 2,826 metres (9,272 ft)

Third Approach
- Location: Kakheti–Tusheti border
- Range: Central Part of the Great Caucasus Mountains
- Coordinates: 42°16′41.1780″N 45°30′31.0788″E

Abano Pass (Georgian: აბანოს უღელტეხილი) is a mountain pass located in Georgia. At 2,826 metres (9,272 ft), it is one of the highest drivable mountain passes in the Caucasus.

== Location ==
It is located in the Central Part of the Great Caucasus Mountains and connects two regions of Georgia: Kakheti to the south and Tusheti to the north.

== Drivability ==
Due to high altitude and snowy winters the pass is closed from mid-October till mid-June (depending on snow amount and road conditions). The damaged road surface allows only 4x4 vehicles to go through.
