= Abano, Georgia =

Abano აბანო
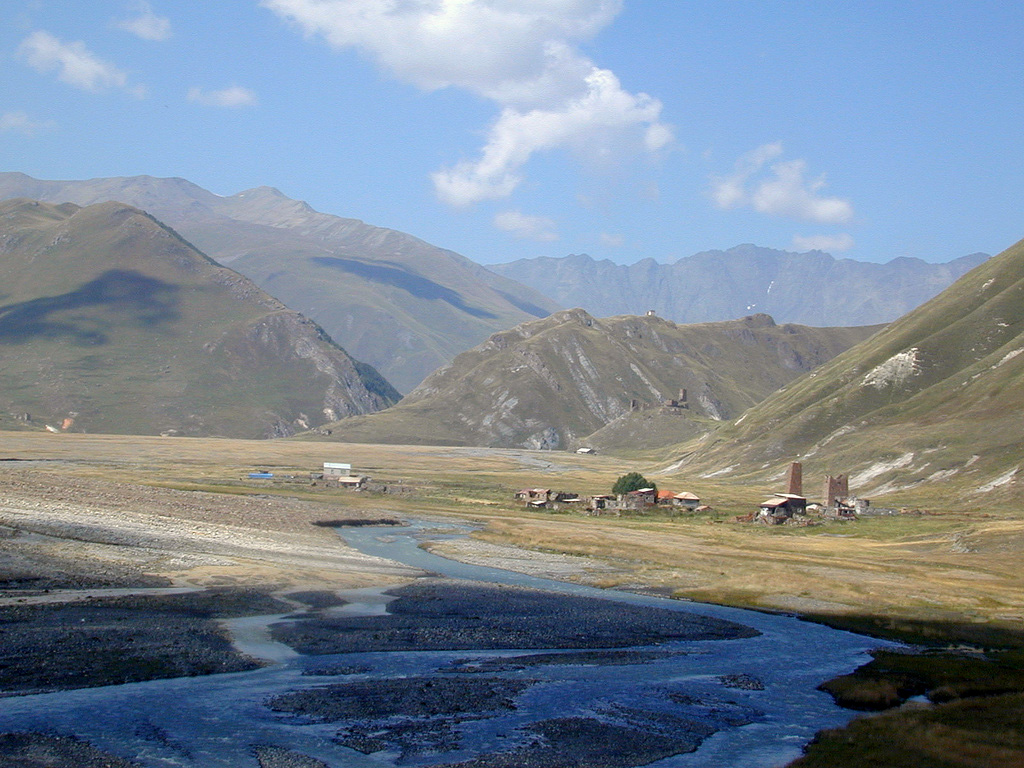
- Village of Abano

- Location in Georgia Abano (Mtskheta-Mtianeti)
- Coordinates: 42°36′14″N 44°23′20″E
- Country: Georgia
- Region: Mtskheta-Mtianeti
- Municipality: Kazbegi
- Community: Kobi
- Elevation: 2,160 m (7,090 ft)

Population (2014)
  - Total: 3
- Time zone: UTC+04:00 (Georgia Time)

Abano (Georgian: აბანო, literally "a bath" ) is a village in north-eastern Georgia. It is located in the Truso Gorge, on the left bank of the Tergi in the Kazbegi Municipality, Mtskheta-Mtianeti region, known as a mkhare, 28 km (17 mi) from Stepantsminda town. The name literally translates as "a bath", a reference to the nearby hot springs, known as Abano Mineral Lake Natural Monument. The 17th-century combat towers survive in the village.

== Sources ==
- "აბანო" (PDF). Georgian Soviet Encyclopedia (in Georgian). Vol. 1. Tbilisi. 1975. p. 13.
