= Abano (Kareli municipality) =

Abano აბანო
- Location in Georgia Abano (Shida Kartli)
- Coordinates: 42°7′32″N 43°43′40″E
- Country: Georgia
- Region: Shida Kartli
- Municipality: Kareli
- Elevation: 720 m (2,360 ft)

Population (2014)
  - Total: 239
- Time zone: UTC+4 (Georgian Time)

Abano (Georgian: აბანო) is a village in Shida Kartli region, Georgia. It is part of the Bredza commune, Kareli municipality, with a population of 239, mostly (99.2%) ethnic Georgians, as of the 2014 census.

Abano is located on the Lopanistskali river at 720 meters above sea level, 27 km. northwest of the town of Kareli.

== See also ==
- Shida Kartli
