= Keterisi =

Keterisi ქეთერისი
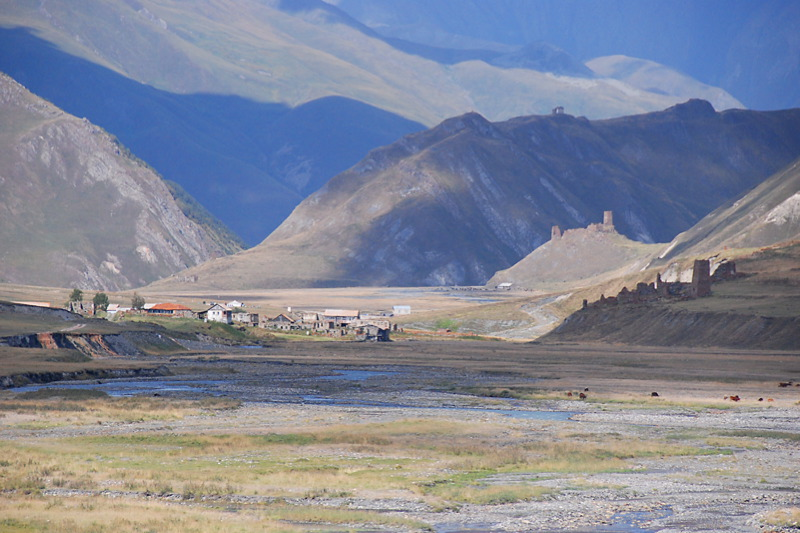
- Village of Keterisi
- Interactive map of Keterisi
- Location within Georgia Location within Mtskheta-Mtianeti
- Coordinates: 42°35′49″N 44°23′57″E
- Country: Georgia
- Mkhare: Mtskheta-Mtianeti
- Municipality: Kazbegi
- Community: Kobi
- Elevation: 2,120 m (6,960 ft)

Population (2014)
  - Total: 0
- Time zone: UTC+4 (Georgian Time)

Keterisi (Georgian: ქეთერისი) is a village in the historical region of Khevi, north-eastern Georgia. It is located on the right bank of the river Tergi. Administratively, it is part of the Kazbegi Municipality in Mtskheta-Mtianeti. It is 32 km from the municipality centre of Stepantsminda.

== See also ==
- Keterisi Mineral Vaucluse

== Sources ==
- Georgian Soviet Encyclopedia, V. 2, pp. 478–479, Tbilisi, 1980 year.
- ქეთერისის მინერალური ვოკლუზის ბუნების ძეგლი
