= Mount Kazbek =

Volcanic mountain in Georgia

Mount Kazbegi
- Mount Kazbegi towering over small Georgian settlements, with Gergeti Trinity Church seen on the left.

Highest point
- Elevation: 5,054 m (16,581 ft)
- Prominence: 2,353 m (7,720 ft)
- Isolation: 113.6 km (70.6 mi)
- Listing: Ultra, Ribu
- Coordinates: 42°41′57″N 44°31′06″E

Naming
- Native name: მყინვარწვერი (Mqinvartsveri), ყაზბეგი (Kazbegi); Башлам (Bashlam); Бешлоам (Beshloam); Сӕна (Sæna); Казбек (Kazbek)

Geography
- Location within Caucasus Mountains Location within Mtskheta-Mtianeti
- Location: Georgia; Russia
- Countries: Russia; Georgia
- Parent range: Lateral Range; Caucasus

Geology
- Mountain type: Stratovolcano (dormant)
- Last eruption: 750 BCE ± 50 years

Climbing
- First ascent: Yosif Buzurtanov (late 18th century)
- Easiest route: Basic snow/ice climb

Mount Kazbek or Mount Kazbegi (Note: Georgian: მყინვარწვერი, romanized: mq'invarts'veri, ყაზბეგი, romanized: q'azbegi; Chechen: Башлам, romanized: Bashlam; Ingush: Бешлоам, romanized: Beshloam; Iron Ossetic: Сӕна, romanized: Sæna; Russian: Казбек, romanized: Kazbek) is a dormant stratovolcano and one of the major mountains of the Caucasus, located in Georgia, just south of the border with Russia.

Lying at 5,054 meters (16,581 ft) above at sea level, Mount Kazbek is the highest mountain in Eastern Georgia. It is also the third-highest peak in the country (after Mount Shkhara and Janga). Kazbegi is the second-highest volcanic summit in the Caucasus, after Mount Elbrus. The summit lies directly to the west of the town of Stepantsminda and is the most prominent geographic feature of the area. The last eruption occurred c. 750 BCE.

== Origin of the name ==
In the Georgian language, the native name of this mountain is Mqinvartsveri, which roughly translates to "Glacier Peak" or "Freezing Cold Peak". The origin of the exonym Kazbek is unclear. According to one claim, it is named after a Circassian nobleman who lived on it, while others maintain it is named after local nobleman Dimitri Chopikashvili (grand father of the Georgian writer Aleksandre Kazbegi) who was given the title of "Kazbeg" by Georgian king Heraclius II of Georgia. The title appeared under Georgian king Rostom in the 17th century. The Ingush name Beshloam and Chechen name Bashlam translates as "Molten Mount".

== Location ==
Kazbek is located on the Khokh Range, a mountain range which runs north of the Greater Caucasus Range, and which is pierced by the gorges of the Ardon and the Terek. At its eastern foot runs the Georgian Military Road through the pass of Darial 2,378 meters (7,805 feet). The mountain itself lies along the edge of the Borjomi–Kazbegi Fault (which is a northern sub-ending of the North Anatolian Fault). The region is highly active tectonically, with numerous small earthquakes occurring at regular intervals. An active geothermal/hot spring system also surrounds the mountain. Kazbek is a potentially active volcano, built up of trachyte and sheathed with lava, and has the shape of a double cone, whose base lies at an altitude of 1,770 meters (5,800 feet). Kazbek is the highest of the volcanic cones of the Kazbegi volcanic group which also includes Mount Khabarjina (3,142 metres).

Owing to the steepness of its slopes, the glaciers of Kazbek are not very large. The total combined area of all of Kazbek's glaciers is 135 km^{2}. The best-known glacier is the Dyevdorak (Devdaraki), which creeps down the north-eastern slope into a gorge of the same name, reaching a level of 2,295 meters (7,530 feet). Kazbegi's other glaciers include the Mna, Denkara, Gergeti, Abano, and Chata. The recent collapse of the Kolka Glacier, located in a valley between Mt. Jimara and Kazbegi in the year 2002 was attributed to solfatara volcanic activity along the northern slope of the mountain, although there was no eruption. In addition to the 2002 event, a massive collapse of the Devdaraki Glacier on the mountain's northeastern slope which occurred on August 20, 2014, led to the death of seven people. The glacier collapse dammed the Terek River in the Daryal Gorge and flooded the Georgian Military Highway.

From 24 to 28 May 2019 Caucasus Skitouring Network organized an expedition to survey Mt. Kazbegi's height. On 27 May 2019 at 12:22 GMT+4, for the first time, a survey team placed a GPS receiver on the Mt. Kazbegi peak. The new height is defined with the WGS 84 datum. Height was determinate with 5mm accuracy. Defined height is 5053.927m.

== Legend ==
Mount Kazbegi is associated in Georgian folklore with Amirani, the Georgian version of Prometheus, who was chained on the mountain in punishment for having stolen fire from the gods and giving it to mortals. The location of his imprisonment later became the site of an Orthodox hermitage located in a cave called "Betlemi" (Bethlehem) at approximately the 4,000-meter level. According to legends, this cave housed many sacred relics, including Abraham's tent and the manger of the infant Jesus.

According to Prince Ioane of Georgia, Ingush mountaineer Yosif Buzurtanov, also known as "Yosif the Mokhevian", was the first to ascend the mountain peak of Kazbek in the late eighteenth century during the reign of Heraclius II of Georgia, though, officially, this occurred in 1868 by D. W. Freshfield, A. W. Moore, and C. Tucker of the Alpine Club, with the guide François Devouassoud, guided by local Gveletians climbers, among them Tsogol Buzurtanov (son of Yosif Buzurtanov). They were followed by Russian alpinists Vladimir Kozmin and Maria Preobrazhenskaya, who made the climb nine times starting in 1900.

== Kazbegi nature reserve ==
The area around Mount Kazbegi was designated a nature reserve by the Soviet government in 1979, and includes beech forests, subalpine forests and alpine meadows. Many of the plants and animals in the reserve are endemic to the Caucasus region.

== Climate ==
Mount Kazbek summit has a polar ice cap climate (Köppen: EF).

Climate data for Kazbek, 1759 m asl (1981–2010 normals)
Month	Jan	Feb	Mar	Apr	May	Jun	Jul	Aug	Sep	Oct	Nov	Dec	Year
Record high °C (°F)	−1.5 (29.3)	8.0 (46.4)	2.0 (35.6)	8.0 (46.4)	7.8 (46.0)	14.0 (57.2)	20.0 (68.0)	21.0 (69.8)	15.0 (59.0)	8.8 (47.8)	14.7 (58.5)	8.0 (46.4)	21.0 (69.8)
Mean daily maximum °C (°F)	−10.9 (12.4)	−9.0 (15.8)	−7.3 (18.9)	−3.3 (26.1)	−0.2 (31.6)	4.7 (40.5)	6.9 (44.4)	7.9 (46.2)	4.4 (39.9)	−0.6 (30.9)	−2.8 (27.0)	−6.9 (19.6)	−1.4 (29.4)
Daily mean °C (°F)	−14.0 (6.8)	−12.3 (9.9)	−10.2 (13.6)	−6.4 (20.5)	−2.5 (27.5)	1.7 (35.1)	4.6 (40.3)	5.5 (41.9)	2.1 (35.8)	−3.9 (25.0)	−6.0 (21.2)	−10.7 (12.7)	−4.3 (24.2)
Mean daily minimum °C (°F)	−17.1 (1.2)	−15.6 (3.9)	−13.0 (8.6)	−9.6 (14.7)	−4.8 (23.4)	−1.4 (29.5)	2.3 (36.1)	3.0 (37.4)	−0.2 (31.6)	−7.0 (19.4)	−9.2 (15.4)	−14.4 (6.1)	−7.3 (18.9)
Record low °C (°F)	−24.9 (−12.8)	−28 (−18)	−28 (−18)	−20.4 (−4.7)	−11 (12)	−11.2 (11.8)	−4 (25)	−5 (23)	−14 (7)	−16 (3)	−18 (0)	−27 (−17)	−28 (−18)
Average precipitation mm (inches)	88.0 (3.46)	68.1 (2.68)	56.8 (2.24)	73.4 (2.89)	123.3 (4.85)	75.3 (2.96)	96.9 (3.81)	99.8 (3.93)	65.5 (2.58)	82.0 (3.23)	107.0 (4.21)	73.8 (2.91)	1,009.9 (39.75)
Average precipitation days (≥ 1 mm)	8.1	6.5	6.9	9.4	13.6	11.6	10.6	8.7	10.0	10.3	10.0	8.3	114
Source 1: Météo climat stats
Source 2: Météo Climat

== See also ==
- List of highest points of Russian federal subjects
- List of volcanoes in Georgia (country)

== Sources ==
- Арджеванидзе, И.А. (1954). Военно-грузинская дорога: Краеведческий очерк с приложением схематической карты маршрута и библиографии [Georgian Military Road: Local history essay with the appendix of a schematic map of the route and bibliography] (in Russian). Tbilisi: Госиздат Грузинской ССР. pp. 1–250.
- Дахкильгов, Ш.Э. (1989). Слово о родном крае (Записки краеведа) [A word about the native land (Notes of a local historian)] (in Russian). Grozny: Чеч.-Инг. кн. изд-во. pp. 1–149. ISBN 5-7666-0023-2.
