= Darial Gorge =

Mountain pass in Georgia (country)

- Caucasian Gates
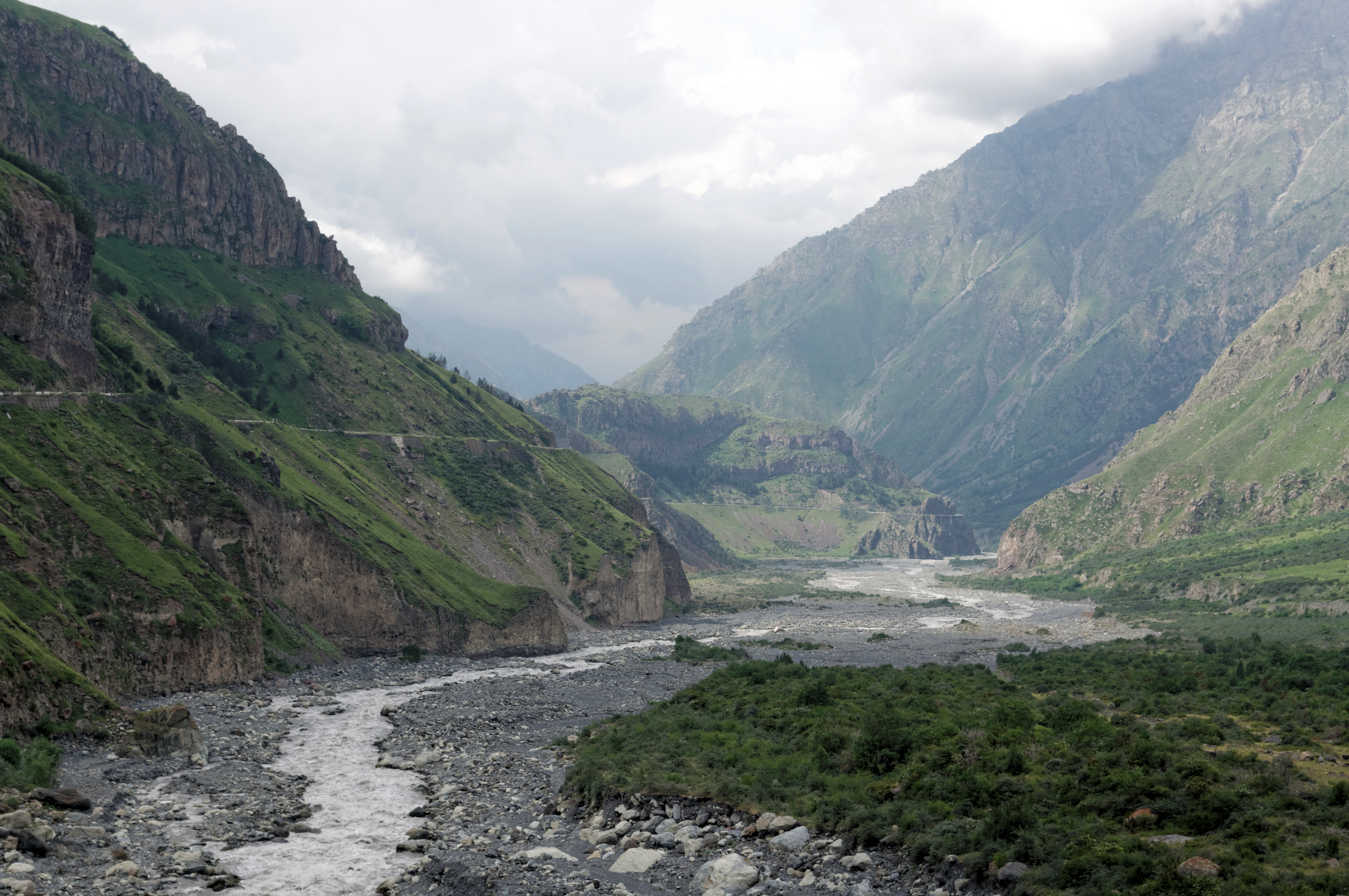
- Darial Gorge near Georgia–Russia border.

- Location within Caucasus Mountains Location within Georgia Location within North Ossetia–Alania

Geography
- Country: Georgia; Russia
- Coordinates: 42°44′41″N 44°37′21″E
- River: Terek
- Interactive map of Darial Gorge

The Darial Gorge (Note: Georgian: დარიალის ხეობა, romanized: darialis kheoba Ingush: Даьра Аьле, Тийрк-чӀож, romanized: Dära Äle/Tiyrk-Chozh Iron Ossetic: Арвыком, romanized: Arvykom Russian: Дарьяльское ущелье, romanized: Daryalskoe ushchelye.) is a river gorge on the border between Russia and Georgia. It is at the east base of Mount Kazbek, south of present-day Vladikavkaz. The gorge was carved by the river Terek, and is approximately 13 kilometres (8.1 mi) long. The steep granite walls of the gorge can be as much as 1,800 metres (5,900 ft) tall in some places. The Georgian Military Road runs through the gorge.

== History ==
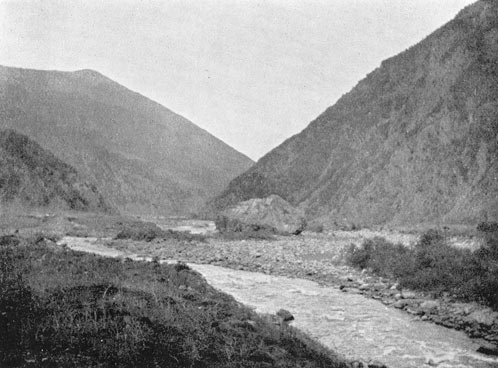
The pass in Luigi Villari's book Fire and Sword in the Caucasus (1906).

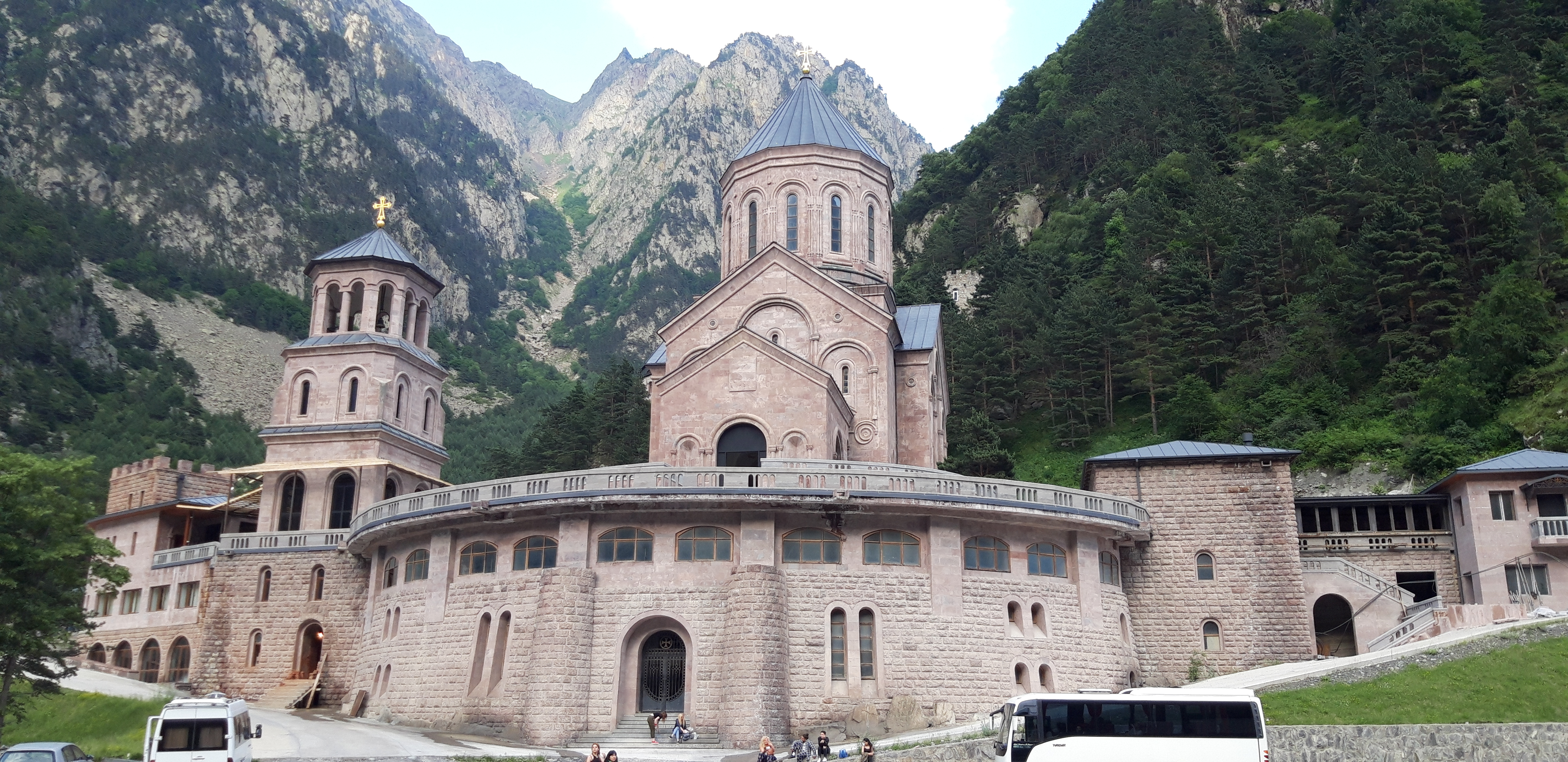
Georgian Orthodox Church of the Archangel in the Dariali Gorge near border with Russia.

The name Darial originates from Dar-i Alān (در الان) meaning "Gate of the Alans" in Persian. The Alans held the lands north of the pass in the first centuries AD. It was fortified in ancient times both by the Romans and Persians; the fortification was variously known as the Iberian Gates (Note: "Garrison of the Iberians" (Greek: Iouroeipaach, Biraparach, from Armenian) https://iranicaonline.org/articles/darband-i-ancient-city) or the Caucasian Gates. It was also frequently mistakenly referred to as the Caspian Gates in classical literature. The pass is mentioned in the Georgian annals under the names of Darialani; Strabo calls it Porta Caucasica and Porta Cumana; Ptolemy, Fortes Sarmatica; it was sometimes known as Porta Caucasica and Portae Caspiae (a name bestowed also on the "gate" or pass beside the Caspian Sea at Derbent); and the Tatars call it Darioly.

Josephus wrote that Alexander the Great built iron gates at an unspecified pass which some Latin and Greek authors identified with Darial.

Darial Pass fell into Sassanid hands in 252–253, when the Sassanid Empire conquered and annexed Iberia. The control of the Darial Pass switched to the Western Turkic Kaganate in 628, when Tong Yabgu Kagan signed a treaty with Iberia, transferring over to the Kaganate the control of all its cities and fortresses, and establishing free trade. Control of Darial Pass switched to the Arab Rashidun Caliphate in 644. Afterwards, it was controlled by the Kingdom of Georgia. There was a battle point between the Ilkhanate and the Golden Horde, then indirectly controlled by Safavids and Qajar state. In 1597, it was invaded and occupied by Kabardians. It was later captured by the Russian Empire following the annexation of the Kingdom of Georgia in 1801-1830. It remained a strategic Russian outpost under Russian control until the dismemberment of the Soviet Union.

== Importance ==
The Darial Pass was historically important as one of only two crossings of the Caucasus mountain range, the other being the Derbent Pass. As a result, Darial Gorge has been fortified since at least 150 BC. In Greco-Roman imagination in the late Antiquity, the Darial Pass was a boundary between the known world (oikoumene) and the unknown world where barbarians lived.

As the main border crossing between Georgia and Russia, it has been the site of Russians fleeing conscription for the Russo-Ukrainian War.

== See also ==
- Gates of Alexander
- Iberian Gates
- Ambush in Darial Gorge
