= Kazbegi National Park =

National park in Georgia

- IUCN category II (national park)
- View from Juta village in Kazbegi Municipality. Located on the southern slope of the main ridge of Kavkasioni. Kazbegi National Park.

- Location within Georgia Location within Mtskheta-Mtianeti
- Location: Georgia
- Nearest city: Stepantsminda
- Coordinates: 42°30′12.61″N 44°27′14.55″E
- Area: 1,446.17 km^{2} (558.37 sq mi)
- Established: 1976
- Governing body: Agency of Protected Areas
- Website: Kazbegi National Park Administration

Kazbegi National Park (Georgian: ყაზბეგის ეროვნული პარკი) is in Kazbegi Municipality in the Mtskheta-Mtianeti region of north-eastern Georgia.

Kazbegi National Park is a popular tourist destination despite the lack of basic tourism infrastructure.

Historical monuments worth a visit are the fourteenth-century Sameba temple, the tenth-century Garbanikerk, the Sioni basilica, the Akhaltsikhe basilica and the seventeenth-century Sno Castle. In the area one finds a mix of Christian and pagan customs.

== See also ==
- List of protected areas of Georgia
- Kazbegi National Park travel guide from Wikivoyage
