= Mtiuleti =

Coordinates: 42°21′07″N 44°41′10″E

Mtiuleti მთიულეთი
- Historical Region
- Map highlighting the historical region of Mtiuleti in Georgia
- Country: Georgia
- Mkhare: Mtskheta-Mtianeti
- Capital: Pasanauri

Area
  - Total: 711 km^{2} (275 sq mi)

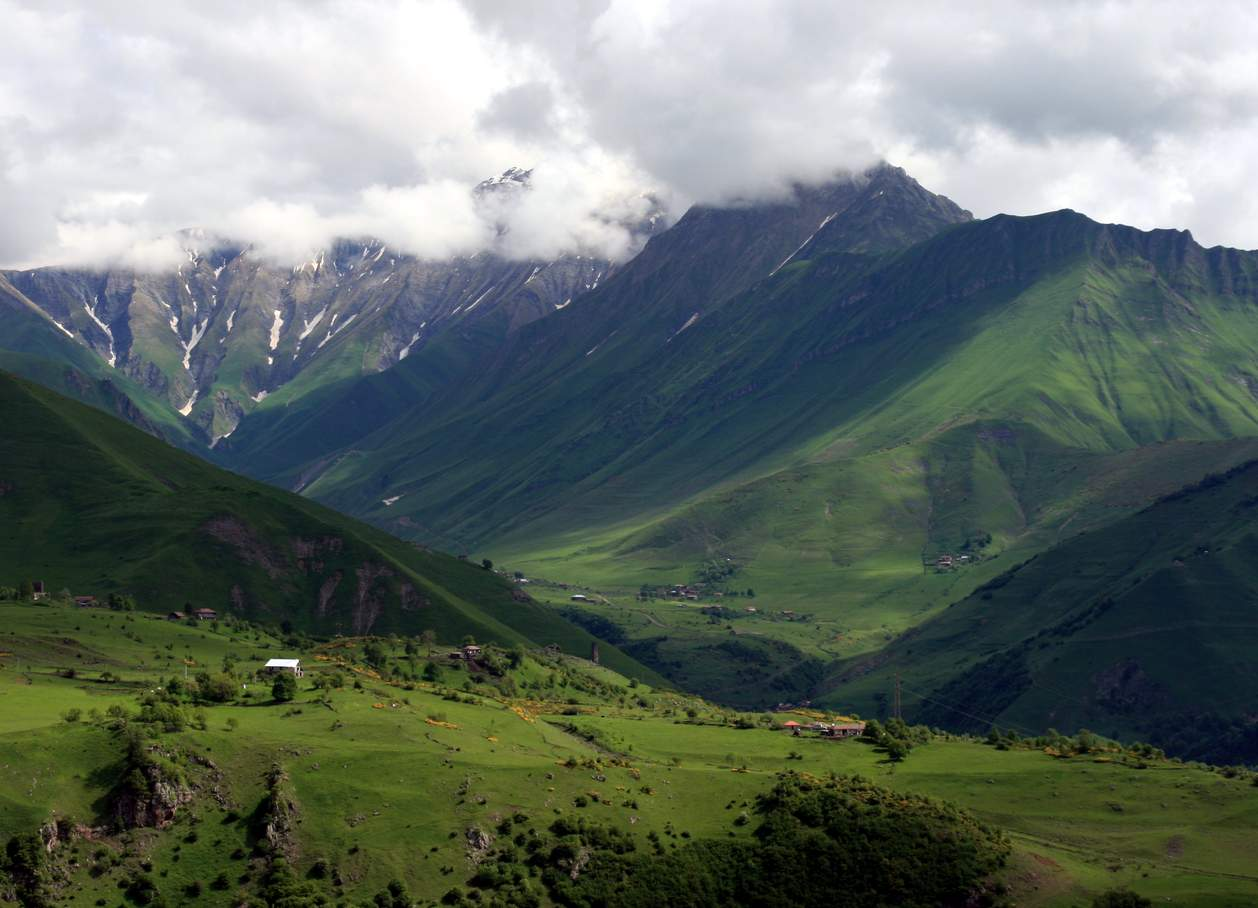
Khada gorge, Mtiuleti

Mtiuleti (Georgian: მთიულეთი; literally, "the land of mountains") is a historical province in eastern Georgia, on the southern slopes of the Greater Caucasus Mountains. It primarily comprises the White Aragvi Valley, and is bordered by Gudamakari on the east, Khando on the south, Tskhrazma on the west, and Khevi on the north. Mtiuleti occupies parts of modern-day districts of Dusheti and Kazbegi, Mtskheta-Mtianeti region (mkhare). A townlet (daba) Pasanauri, famous for its khinkali, is a traditional center of the region.

In its original and narrower sense, Mtiuleti comprises a small historic mountainous community called Tskhavati. Since the 13th century, the neighboring valleys of Khado and Gudamakari have also been frequently viewed as parts of Mtiuleti.

According to a historic tradition, St. Nino, a female baptizer of Georgians, preached Christianity here in the early 4th century. Next heard of Mtiuleti and its people were in connection with the Georgian campaign by the Arab commander Bugha al-Kabir, whose army assaulted the mountains of Iberia/Kartli in the 850s, but failed to force the Mtiuletians into submission. In the subsequent centuries, the Mtiuletians remained loyal subjects to the Georgian crown and joined the expedition sent by Queen Tamar to subdue the rebellious mountainous clans in the early 13th century. Under Tamar, due its strategic location, Mtiuleti was placed under the administration of high-ranking Georgian officials such as Abulasan, a viceroy of Kartli, and Tchiaber, a chancellor of Georgia. Later, in the early 14th century, Mtiuleti was contested between two powerful feudal houses, the eristavis of the Ksani and the Aragvi. Initially supported by the kings of Georgia, the former prevailed, but for a short time. Eventual winners, the eristavs of Aragvi, ruled the area until being dispossessed by the king of Georgia in 1743. From May to September 1804, Mtiuleti was a scene of an uneasy revolt against Imperial Russia, which had annexed eastern Georgia in 1801. The uprising quickly spread to the neighboring mountainous regions, but was eventually suppressed by the Russian commander Pavel Tsitsianov after heavy fighting.
