= Battle of Echmiadzin (1804) =

Battle of the Russo-Persian War

- Part of the Russo-Persian War of 1804–1813
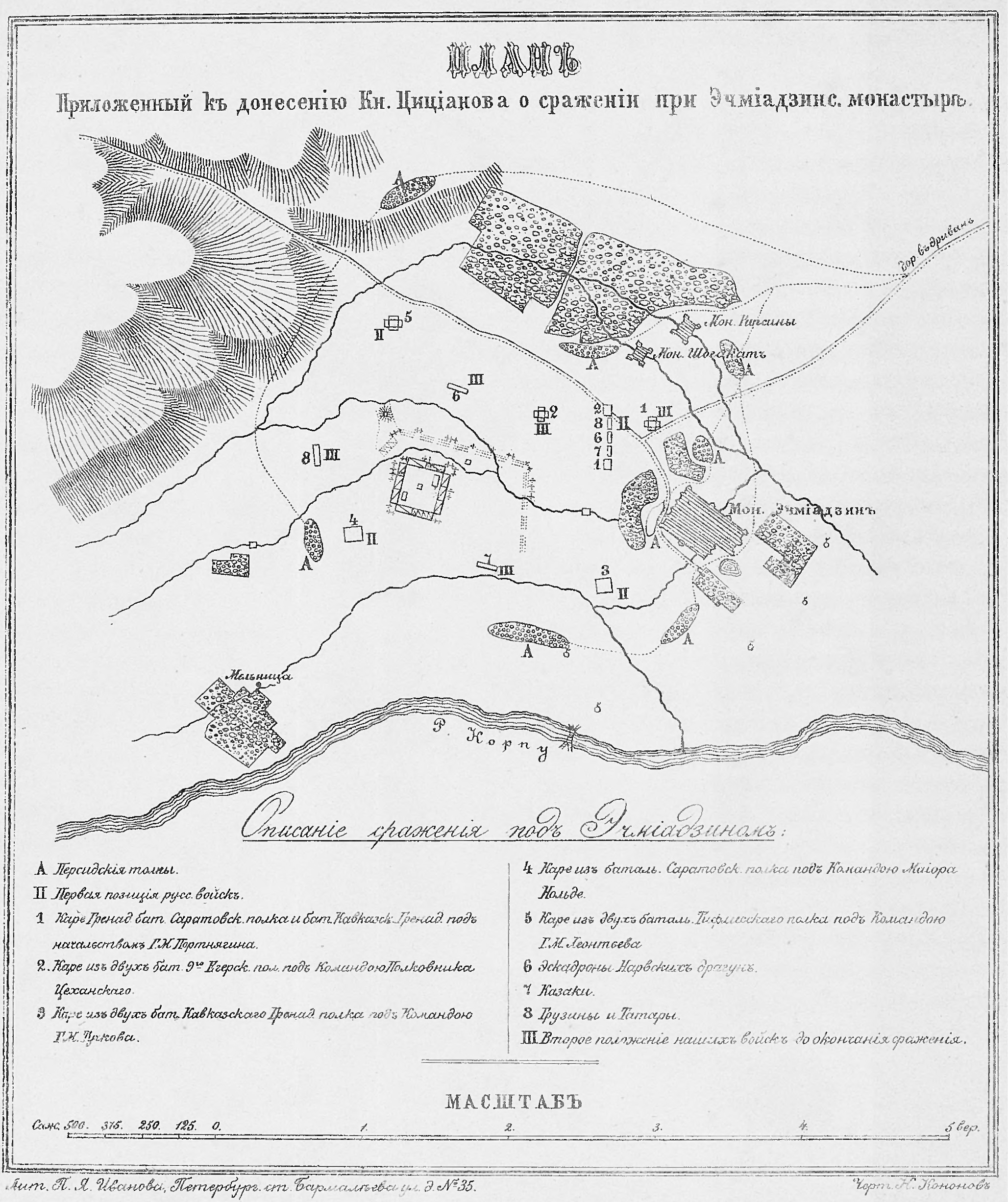
- Russian plan illustrating Tsitsianov's report of the battle at Echmiadzin
Date	June 1804
Location	Echmiadzin, Qajar Iran (present-day Vagharshapat, Armenia) (Note: Vagharshapat is still commonly referred to as Echmiadzin / Ejmiatsin / Etchmiadzin.)

Belligerents
Russian Empire	Persia

Commanders and leaders
Pavel Tsitsianov	Fath-Ali Shah; Abbas Mirza

Strength
5,000	20,000

The Battle of Echmiadzin took place in June 1804, during the Russo-Persian War of 1804–1813. A Russian force of 5,000 men under Pavel Tsitsianov advanced on Erivan. A Persian army of 20,000 under Crown-Prince Abbas Mirza met him at Echmiadzin. Cutting off the Russian's supplies, the Persians successfully defended the town and forced the Russians to withdraw. Though the Russians were unable to capture Echmiadzin, and were in fact pushed away from it, the outcome of the battle itself has been variously described as inconclusive, a Persian victory, or a Russian victory.

== Background ==
In 1801, capitalizing on political turmoil in Iran, the Russians annexed Kartli-Kakheti (eastern Georgia), a region which had been part of Iran for centuries. In 1802, Pavel Tsitsianov was appointed as the new Russian commander-in-chief in the Caucasus. A die-hard Russian imperialist and expansionist, he had little respect for either the inhabitants of the Caucasus or the Iranians. In January 1804, he invaded Iran, besieging the Iranian city of Ganja. After a month he captured and ruthlessly sacked it; up to 3,000 Iranians were massacred in three days of pillage. This initiated the Russo-Persian War of 1804–1813.

== Battle ==
After the capture of Ganja, Tsitsianov proceeded to Erivan. At Echmiadzin, near Erivan, his army clashed with that of Crown-Prince and Commander-in-Chief Abbas Mirza and Fath-Ali Shah; a three-day battle followed.

The Russian artillery inflicted considerable casualties on the Iranian army, which at the time had not yet been modeled on modern lines. In their own way the Iranians proved to be effective; surrounding the Russians and preventing them from receiving supplies. This forced Tsitsianov to withdraw, and he was thus unable to take Echmiadzin. This was a tactical defensive success for the Iranians. However, in line with the traditional Iranian concept of warfare, they allowed the Russians to escape, instead of making full use of the advantage they had gained.

== Aftermath ==
A few days after the battle, the Russians returned to Echmiadzin, where they caught a different Iranian force by surprise and decisively defeated them. Tsitsianov's forces entered Echmiadzin, which, according to Auguste Bontems-Lefort, a contemporary French military envoy to Iran, they looted, seriously damaging the Armenian religious buildings. According to Bontems-Lefort, the Russian behaviour contrasted with that of the Iranian king, who treated the local Christian population with respect. Tsitsianov then marched on Erivan once again. The Iranians who had survived the surprise attack regrouped and were able to participate in the ensuing defense of Erivan.

== Sources ==
- Atkin, Muriel (1980). Russia and Iran, 1780–1828. University of Minnesota Press. ISBN 978-0816609246.
- Cronin, Stephanie, ed. (2013). Iranian-Russian Encounters: Empires and Revolutions since 1800. Routledge. ISBN 978-0415624336.
- Kazemzadeh, Firuz (1991). "Iranian relations with Russia and the Soviet Union, to 1921". In Avery, Peter; Hambly, Gavin; Melville, Charles (eds.). The Cambridge History of Iran (Vol. 7). Cambridge University Press. ISBN 978-0521200950.
- Suny, Ronald Grigor (1994). The Making of the Georgian Nation. Indiana University Press. ISBN 978-0253209153.
- Tucker, Spencer C., ed. (2010). "Overview of 1800-1850: Chronology". A Global Chronology of Conflict: From the Ancient World to the Modern Middle East. Vol. Three: 1775-1860. ABC-CLIO. ISBN 978-1851096725.
