= Siege of Ganja (1804) =

Part of the Russo-Persian War

- Part of Russo-Persian War (1804–1813)
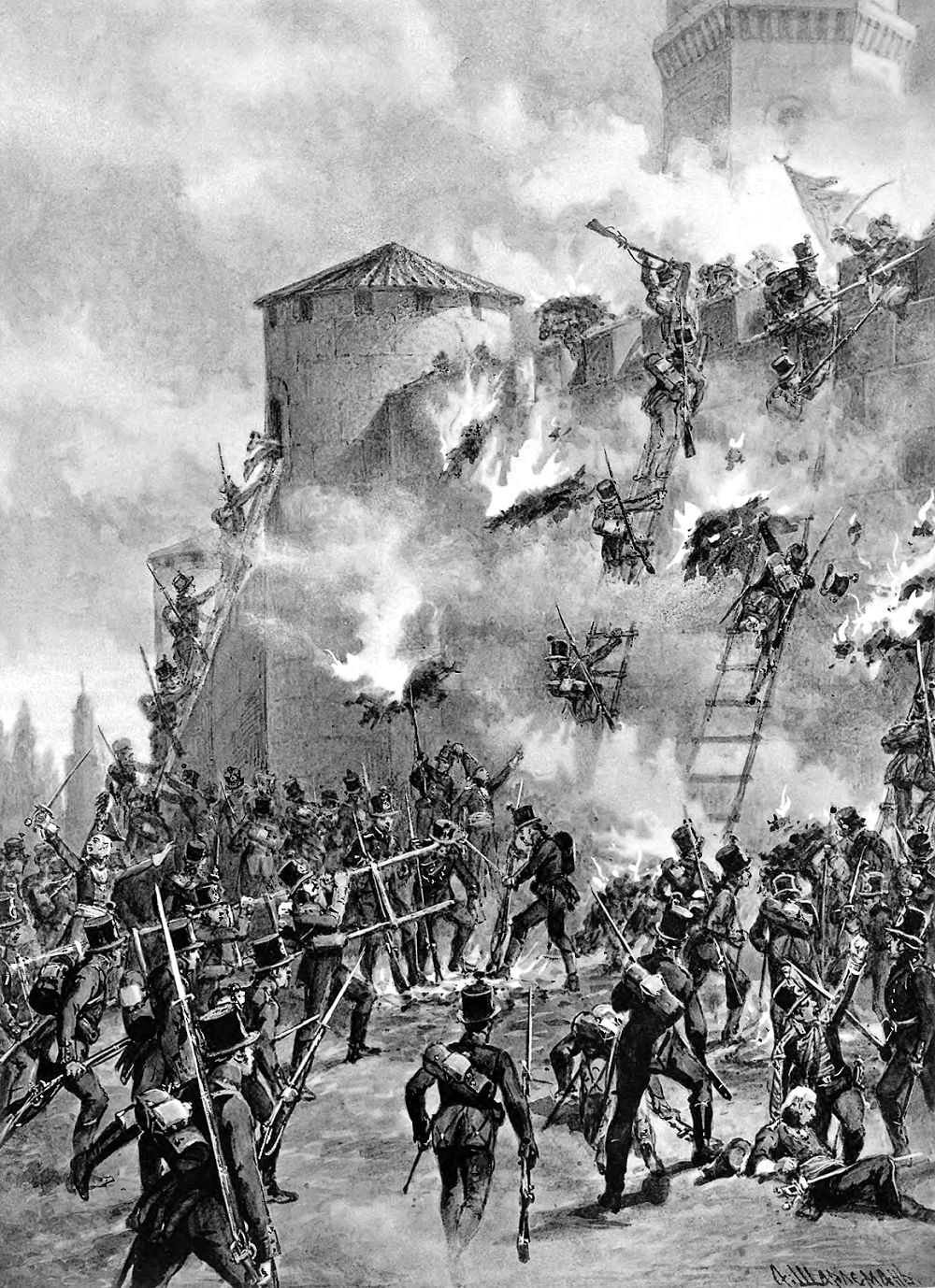
- Storming of Ganja
Date	22 November [O.S. 10 November] 1803 – 15 January [O.S. 3 January] 1804
Location	South Caucasus; Ganja, Ganja Khanate, in part vassal of Qajar Iran (modern-day Azerbaijan)
Result	Russian victory
Territorial changes	Russia captures Ganja

Belligerents
Russian Empire	Qajar Iran: Ganja Khanate

Commanders and leaders
Paul Tsitsianov	Javad Khan †

Strength
6 battalions of infantry: • 2 battalions of Sevastopol Musketeer Regiment; • 3 battalions of the 17th Jaeger Regiment; • 1 battalion from Grenadier Regiment of the Caucasus; 1 regiment (3 squadrons) of Narva Dragoons; 165 Cossacks; 700 Tatar horsemen; 12 guns	4 guns, and about 1,700 soldiers

Casualties and losses
38 killed and wounded (3 officers and 35 of the lower ranks of the Russian Army)	1,700 soldiers (killed in fighting and executed)
- 3,000 – 7,000 inhabitants of Ganja (executed)

The siege of Ganja (Persian: نبرد گنجه) or assault on Ganja or storming of Ganja (Russian: Штурм Гянджи) was the result of a Russian offensive in the South Caucasus intended to conquer the Ganja Khanate of Qajar Iran, which contributed to the escalation of the Russo-Persian War (1804–1813).

== Prologue ==
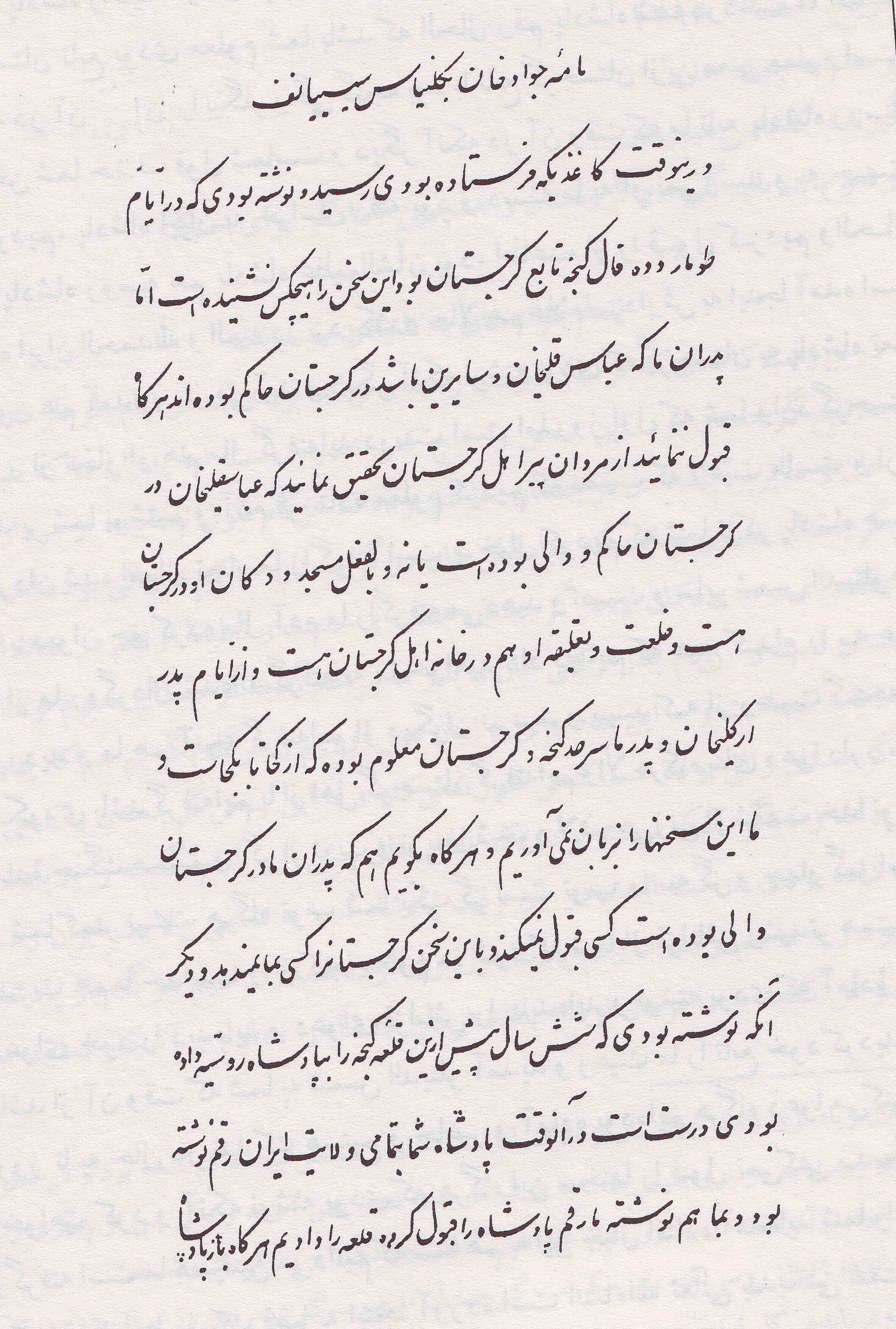
Javad Khan's answer to Tsitsianov

After Tsar Paul's decision to annex Georgia (December 1800) and, after Paul's assassination (11 March 1801), the activist policy followed by his son and successor, Alexander I, aimed at establishing Russian control over the khanates of the eastern Caucasus. In 1803, the newly appointed commander of Russian forces in the Caucasus, Paul Tsitsianov, attacked Ganja. After Mohammad Khan Qajar invasion of Tbilisi, which Javad Khan fought alongside Agha Muḥammad Khān, Tsitsianov wrote a letter to Javad Khan, demanding a voluntary surrender:

The first and main reason I came here is that since the time of Queen Tamara of Georgia, Ganja was owned by the Georgian kings, but because of weakness of them, taken away from Georgia. Russian Empire, taking Georgia into its high-performance protection and citizenship, can not look with indifference to the dissolution of Georgia, and God ascended the Russian empire to keep Ganja. Ganja is through property and part of Georgia, in the hands of strangers.I offer you the surrender the city, come and give the city with the troops, and I, because of the European manner and faith I professed, should not start to shed human blood. But if tomorrow at noon, do not get an answer, the battle will begin, carried by fire and sword, and you will know if I could keep my word.

Javad Khan answered:

... you wrote:" In the era of Tamar, the land of Dedeh-faal of Ganja was subordinate to Georgia.No one has ever heard of such words. But know that our ancestors like Abbas Qoli Khan and others were rulers of Georgia and if you do not believe this, then ask the old folks of Georgia with regards to the Abbas Qoli Khan and ask them if he was the ruler or not. [As a sign of this proof,] currently, his mosque and market place are in Georgia. And the kingly clothes bestowed upon his servants as well as his letters/documents are with the people of Georgia. From the days of the Erekli Khan's father and our father, the borders between Ganja and Georgia were clearly defined. And we do not need to mention these facts, because if we say that our ancestors were the sovereigns of Georgia, no one on your side will believe it and they will not bestow Georgia upon us...

...You also wrote, six years ago, I gave away the fort of Ganja to the ruler of Russia. This is true, at that time, your ruler wrote letters to all the provinces of Iran and also to us and we accepted the letter and gave the fort. Whenever the king[of Russia] wrote us a decree with regards to Ganja, then make that decree clear so that we may observe that decree and apply it. And you wrote to us "We were a client of Georgia", then know it that right now the letter of your king [the king of Russia] is in our hands and in that letter, you can see that our title was Beglarbegi of Ganja and not a client of Georgia and thus your words are in contradiction with your [own] decree. And the other thing that when we get under the rule of the Russian king, the Iranian king were to Khorasan and we could not reach him, and due to that [fact] the king of Russia is also great, we accepted his obedience, but now, praise be to God, the Iranian king is near and his servant general has come to us and also his army, and more of them will come [to help us]...

...And whenever you seek for a battle, know that we are ready for battle and if you boast about your cannon and guns, thanks to the mercy [of] God, our cannon and guns is no less than yours. And if your cannons are one gaz know that our cannons are three/four gazs and victory is [only] due to God. And how do you know if you are braver than the Qizilbash, you have seen yourself fighting but have not seen the fighting of the Qizilbash. And you have written to us to be ready for battle. From the time that you came to Shamss al-Dinlu and brought our people under your command, we have been preparing and we are ready for the day of battle if you want to fight. And when you wrote:" If you do not accept our words in this letter then misfortune will strike", we know such thoughts have brought you here. Fate has brought you from Saint Petersburg to that misfortune here. With the will of God, the highest, may your misfortune become apparent.

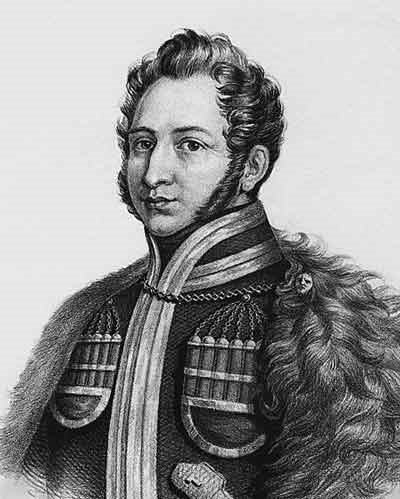
Paul Tsitsianov

After this response, the Russian troops moved forward and opened gunfire. Javad Khan defended heroically and the siege lasted a month, Tsitsianov renewed demands to surrender five times, but to no avail. "I'll take the fortress and I will deliver thee to death," - he wrote and the stubborn Khan answered: "You'll find me dead on the fortress wall !", and both vowed to fulfil their respective promises. Finally, the 14th in January 1804, the Russian council of war decided to do: "Be the assault the next day".

== Battle ==
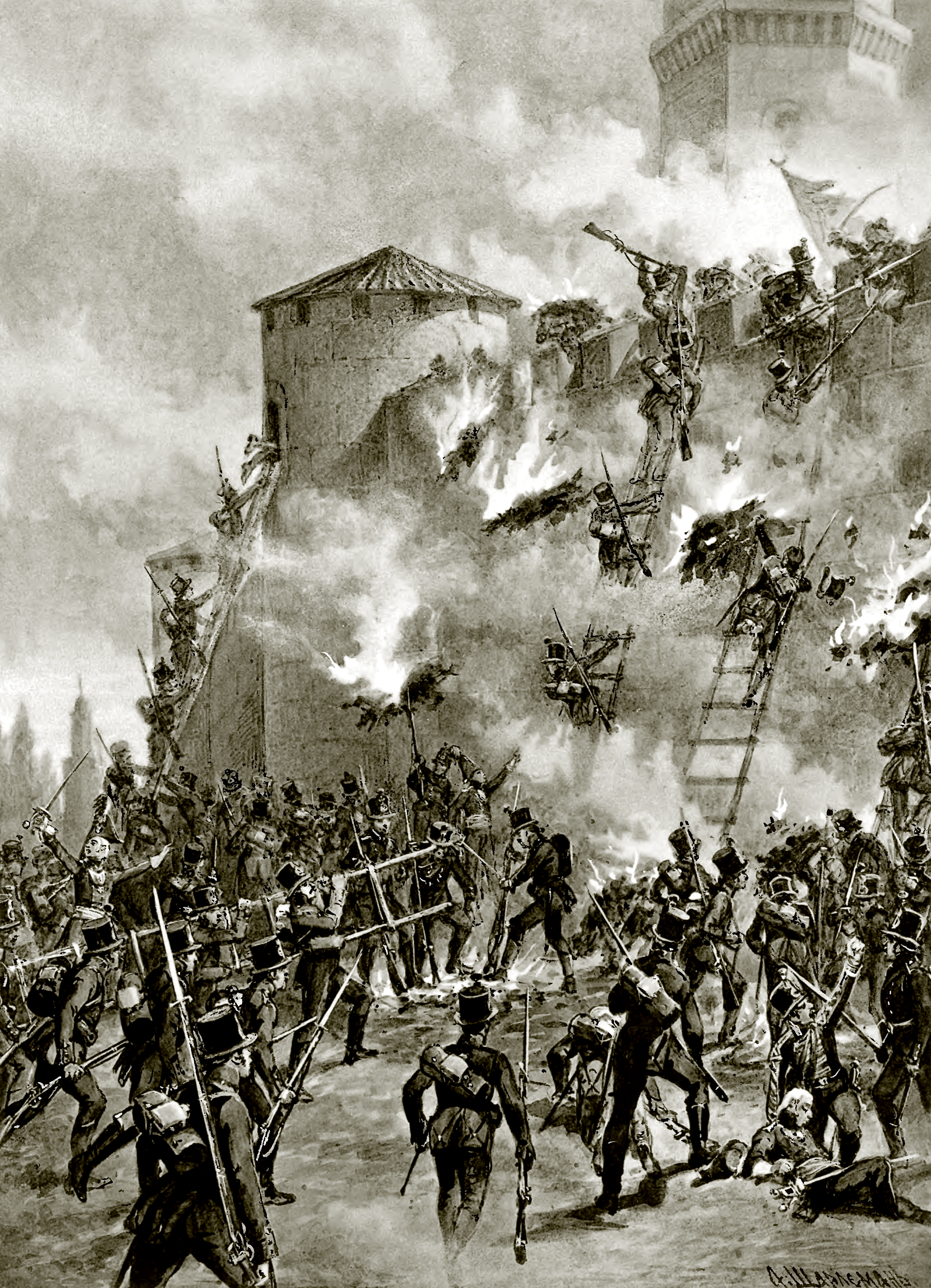
Adolf Charlemagne "Battle of Ganja".

Tsitsianov divided the Russian troops into two columns, one was entrusted to Major-General Portnyagin (Karabagh gate) and the other to Colonel Pavel Karyagin (Tbilisi Gate). Early morning (5.00 am), January 15, the column of Portnyagin, approached the Karabagh gate and pierced a hole in the ground before the wall, but as the defenders focused their main forces there Portnyagin left it aside and stormed the ramparts with ladders. The resistance he met was so great that the Russian troops resumed the attack twice, and twice were repulsed with considerable loss. Then Portniagin rushed himself at the head of the column and first went to the wall, followed by a Lieutenant of the regiment of the Narva that fell, struck by several bullets. Then Major Bartenev of the Caucasus Grenadier Regiment fell and finally, it was Lieutenant Colonel Simanovich’s Grenadiers that managed to climb the stairs to the wall and help out Portnyagina. Meanwhile, the second column, led by Colonel Karyagin, ascended the wall from the gate of Tbilisi, and took possession of the main tower. The other two towers were taken one by one by major Lisanevich. Javad Khan, who did not want to seek safety in flight, took the gun and sword in hand and defended himself until he was killed by captain Kalovski, who himself was immediately killed by the defenders. The Khan's death brought confusion into the ranks of the defenders, but they still showed resistance and piled heavy stones.

The city at this time was in terrible confusion. Crowds of the people, on horse and foot, rushed in disorder on the streets, vainly searching for the already deceased Khan. Residents hid in their homes and barns, women filled the air with frantic cries. Meanwhile, Russian soldiers with bayonets cleared the street, entirely covered with dead bodies. By noon the battle began to subside, and broke again only for a moment when, according to Tstsianov, the soldiers came upon 500 men, who had entrenched themselves in the Juma mosque. At first they offered to surrender, but when one Armenian said that among them are some Lezgins, it was the signal for the death of all defenders, because the hatred of Lezgins was so strong among the Russian troops.

Tsitsianov deeply appreciated the effort of the soldiers in the capture of the fortress and wrote:"...this is proof of moral superiority of Russian Empire over Persians and that spirit of confidence in the victory, will feed and warm up the soldiers that I consider as my first purpose".

The elder son of Javad Khan, Hossein Quli Khan, was also killed during the battle, the rest of the khan's family was taken prisoner and years later (1812) were given permission to go to Iran via Baku. His younger son, Ughurlu, survived, went to Iran and later fought the Russian Empire when the Iranians attacked Ganja in the second Russo-Persian war.

=== Massacre ===
Various Persian and western historians have written on the dimensions of the massacre that took place after the fall of the city. Etemad ol saltane (an Iranian historian) states that the massacre that ensued after the battle continued for three days, Hedayat has a more accurate time of three hours, Abbasgulu Bakikhanov mentions the massacre but does not give more information. It is estimated that about 1,500-3,000 men died.

=== Shah's response ===
At the beginning of the battle, Javad khan sent a messenger to Fath Ali Shah and requested reinforcement. Shah gathered a 30,000-strong force and sent them to Ganja, but the force did not reach the Ganja in time because of the coldness of January and also because Hossein Khan Sardar, the governor khan of the Erevan Khanate had rebelled against the Shah and only one letter carrier, Saied Bayk, reached the town in time.

== Aftermath ==
External image
- Silver medal Awarded to Russian soldiers participating in the capture of Ganja Fortress.
- Silver medal of Alexander I Awarded to Russian soldiers participating in the capture of Ganja Fortress, 1804

Taking Ganja was an event of extraordinary importance because it was considered a fortress key to the northern provinces of Persia. Thereafter, Tsitsianov changed the name of the city to Yelizavetpol, after empress consort Elizabeth Alexeievna, the wife of tsar Alexander I of Russia. Referring to the place by its old name became a crime punishable by a fine, the main mosque was turned into a church, and Russian law replaced Islamic law. However, as Swietochowski notes, the name never found acceptance amongst the Azerbaijanis, who continued to call the town Ganja.

Javad Khan's surviving wives and relatives who had not escaped to Iran (as had most of his sons) were arrested. They were held as prisoners in the citadel until 1812, when they were freed by Tsitsianov's successor Philip Paulucci, who held the view that Javad Khan was a valiant man who died fighting to defend his interests.

With Tsitianov's attack on Ganja, the Iranians saw a direct invasion of their country's territory. The issue was now no longer to impose tribute on the Lezgins or about re-asserting Persian domination over Christian Georgia, which had happened several years before; now, the integrity of Shi'ite Iran itself had been violated by the invasion of the town of Ganja.

=== Immigration ===
Two years after the Russian occupation of Ganja, Ugurlu Khan, the son of Javad Khan, with the assistance of crown prince Abbas Mirza, moved many inhabitants of Ganja across the Iranian border, and the protection of 6,000 families of inhabitants of Ganja was entrusted to Pir-Gholi khan Qajar, who moved them to Tabriz. Then in 1809, the Borchali and Ayrumlu tribes of Ganja moved to Nakhchivan, where they were renamed to Qarapapaq (Black hat in Azeri language), and finally after Nakhchivan was ceded to Russia, they went to Solduz (Naqadeh) in Iranian West Azerbaijan Province. Other main places of Qarapapaq residence are the provinces of Ardahan (around Lake Çıldır), Kars and Iğdır in Turkey.

== Notes ==
a. Iranian historians like Donbuli, blame the Armenians of Ganja and Nasib beg Shams-od-dinlu for the fall of the fortress and accuse the Armenians of opening the gate for capturing the tower.

== See also ==
- Ganja Fortress

== Sources ==
- Bournoutian, George (2021). From the Kur to the Aras: A Military History of Russia's Move into the South Caucasus and the First Russo-Iranian War, 1801–1813. Brill. ISBN 978-9004445154.
- Fisher, William Bayne; Avery, P.; Hambly, G. R. G; Melville, C. (1991). The Cambridge History of Iran. Vol. 7. Cambridge: Cambridge University Press. ISBN 978-0521200950.
