= Siege of Erivan (1804) =

Part of the Russo-Persian War of 1804–1813

- Part of the Russo-Persian War of 1804–1813
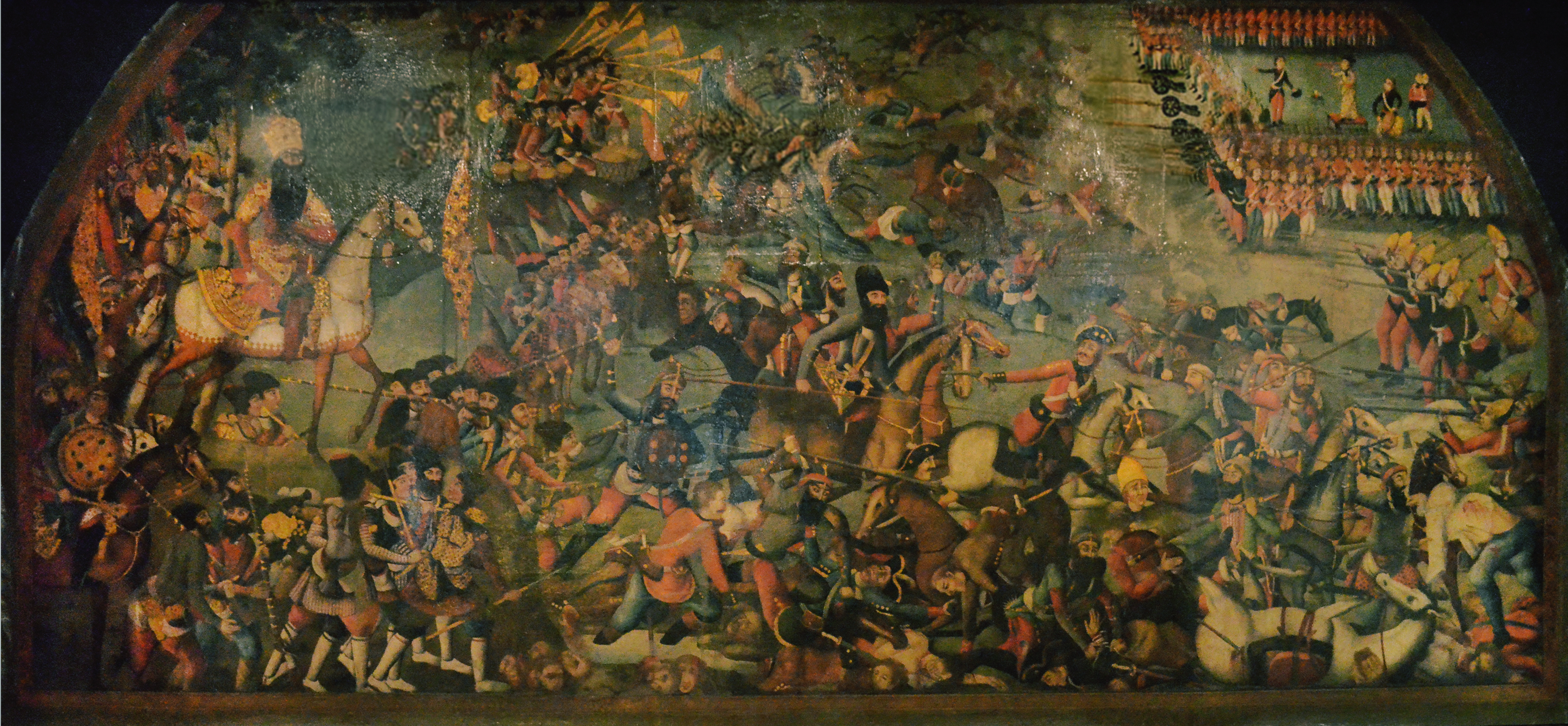
- Fath-Ali Shah's victory over the Russians at Yerevan. Mirza Baba, Iran, 1804–1810
Date	July–September 1804
Location	Erivan, Qajar Iran (present-day Yerevan, Armenia)
Result	Persian victory

Belligerents
Qajar Iran; Erivan Khanate	(Russia) Russian Empire

Commanders and leaders
Fath-Ali Shah; Abbas Mirza; Mohammad Khan	(Russian Empire) Pavel Tsitsianov

Strength
6,000–7,000 troops inside the citadel 18,000 cavalrymen	3,000 to 20,000; Georgian and Armenian auxiliaries

Casualties and losses
Unknown	Heavy

The siege of Erivan (Yerevan, the capital of modern Armenia) took place from July to September 1804, during the Russo-Persian War (1804–1813). After a difficult advance, the Russians under Pavel Tsitsianov besieged Erivan. The Iranian forces inside Erivan's citadel prevented the Russians from making a direct attack, while those outside the citadel surrounded the Russians and cut the invaders' supply lines. Commanded by Crown-Prince Abbas Mirza and King Fath-Ali Shah Qajar himself (r. 1797–1834), the Iranians successfully defended the city and defeated the Russian attack. Tsitsianov, in order to save his reputation, shifted the blame on a plethora of people and matters, and deliberately left out his own wrongdoings.

== Background ==
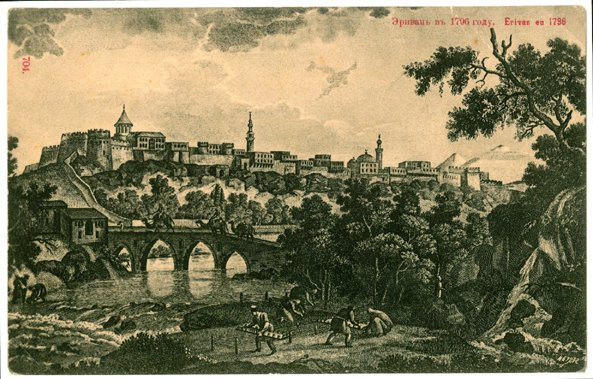
Erivan in 1796 in the Qajar era, as engraved by G. Sergeevich

In 1801, capitalising on political turmoil in Iran, the Russians annexed Kartli-Kakheti (eastern Georgia), a region which had been part of Iran for centuries. In 1802, Pavel Tsitsianov was appointed as the new Russian commander-in-chief in the Caucasus. A die-hard Russian imperialist and expansionist, he had little respect for either the inhabitants of the Caucasus or the Iranians. In January 1804, he invaded Iran, besieging the Iranian city of Ganja. After a month he captured and ruthlessly sacked it; up to 3,000 Iranians were massacred in three days of pillage. This initiated the Russo-Persian War of 1804–1813.

After the capture of Ganja, Tsitsianov proceeded to Erivan. At Echmiadzin, near Erivan, his army clashed with that of Crown Prince and commander-in-chief Abbas Mirza and Tsitsianov and his men were forced to withdraw. A few days later the Russians returned to Echmiadzin, where they caught an Iranian force by surprise and defeated it. They then marched on Erivan once again. The surviving Iranians regrouped and joined the subsequent defence of Erivan.

== Siege ==
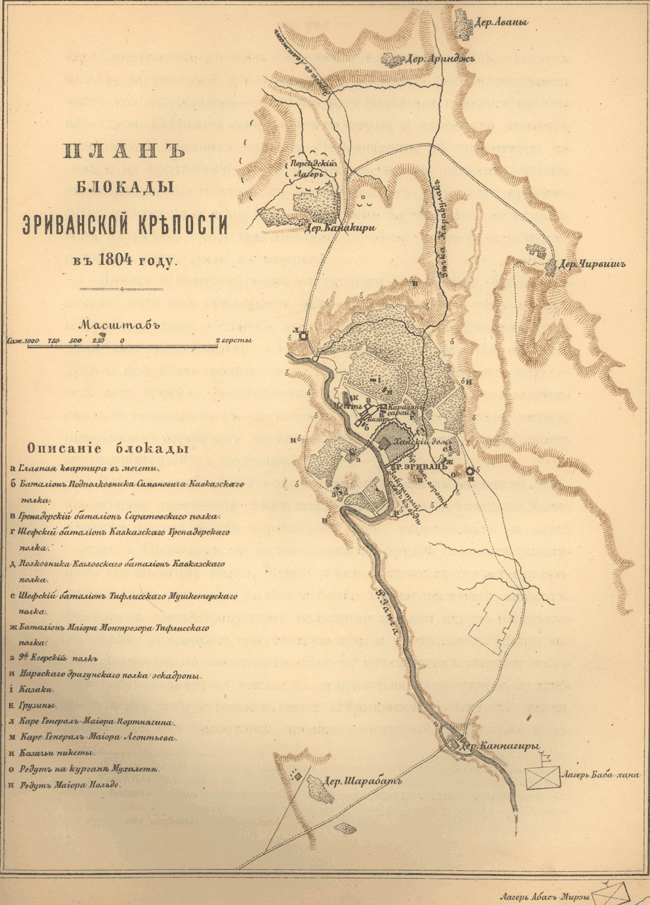
Russian plan of the 1804 siege of Erivan

At the end of June, Tsitsianov arrived in front of Erivan, with an army ranging between 3,000 and 20,000 men, as well as Georgian and Armenian auxiliaries. The Russians attacked, accompanied by a heavy bombardment. The king (shah) himself was present at the defence and commanded troops. At the time of the battle the Iranians still fought with their "traditional army", mainly composed of light artillery and mobile cavalry; they had not yet initiated the program that would later create a military on modern lines (the Nezam-e Jadid).

As the Russians besieged the 6,000–7,000 Iranian troops who held out inside Erivan's citadel, Iranian forces outside the citadel, some 18,000 cavalrymen, in turn, cut the line of communications of the invaders and surrounded them. The Iranians fought with more courage and effectiveness than the Russians had expected. During the siege, they prevented the Russians from receiving supplies and reinforcements, while Erivan's garrison prevented the Russians from making any direct attacks. The Russian artillery proved to be effective once more, similar to the encounter at Echmiadzin, but the Iranians were able to inflict heavy casualties on the Russians and prevent them from advancing towards the citadel. In order to disrupt the Russians even more, they burned many wheat fields. Tsitsianov then sent a detachment consisting of 200 soldiers in order to pick up supplies made ready by the recently established military administration in Tiflis (Tbilisi); 6,000 Iranian troops managed to surround the detachment, killing most of them, and enslaving most of the survivors.

During Tsitsianov's campaign, the first major anti-Russian rebellion broke out amongst the locals in the newly established Georgia Governorate. Reasons behind the uprising were dissatisfaction with Tsitsianov's policies, the corruption of Pyotr Ivanovich Kovalensky's administration, and the abolition of the Bagrationi dynasty. In September, five of Tsitsianov's six generals concluded that his plan had failed, and forced him to break off the siege.

== Aftermath ==
The Russians had suffered heavy casualties. A large proportion had died or ended up wounded, and another thousand had become ill. The rest had become weakened as they had had to live and fight for five weeks on half rations. Even during the retreat, the situation remained dire for the Russian soldiers. There was still a shortage of food and water amongst the soldiers, and as a large amount of their pack animals had died, they were forced to carry the equipment themselves. Furthermore, Iranian raiders pursued them, "picking off stragglers and setting fire to the parched fields".

The Erivan siege had left the Georgia Governorate with insufficient troops during a period of increased Lezgin raiding. Tsitsianov had caused further aggravation amongst the locals of the Governorate by forcing local peasants to work under "extremely harsh conditions to improve the road across the mountains". This contributed to an increasing number of Georgians wanting the restoration of the Bagrationis, to which the Iranians gave military support.

Even Tsitsianov was aware that he had failed at Erivan. This is further stipulated by the fact that the Russians did not write an official report "of their own battle casualties for the siege of the campaign as a whole". After returning to the Georgia Governorate, Tsitsianov reported to Alexander I (r. 1801–1825). In order to save his reputation he blamed the failure of the siege on his subordinate generals, the Iranian governor of Erivan (Mohammad Khan Qajar), and on the "harsh terrain" which separated the Erivan Khanate from the Georgia Governorate. Tsitsianov stated that the Iranian governor needed to be "annihilated" if Russia wanted to achieve glory and a proper strategic position in the Caucasus. However, the person most to blame, according to Tsitsianov, was general and prince Dmitri Mikhailovich Volkonsky. According to Tsitsianov, the "disgrace" at Yerevan was caused by Volkonsky's failure to bring up supplies. What he chose not to report was that the area between Erivan up to Georgia was controlled by the Iranians, who prevented Russian contingents from travelling between them, and that the Georgia Governorate needed every soldier it could muster for provincial peacekeeping and therefore could not spare troops to escort supplies. Alexander I received the report warmly; he subsequently recalled Volkonsky, and rewarded Tsitsianov. In contrast, a few years later, when Tsitsianov's successor Ivan Gudovich unsuccessfully besieged Erivan, Alexander condemned his expedition as "stupid" and sent him into retirement.

Tsitsianov's campaign had resulted in numerous Armenian families leaving the khanate for the Georgia Governorate. The Iranian army, after the successful defence, in line with their customary protocol, received orders to disband for the winter with instructions to reassemble in the spring of 1805 for a new campaign.

== Sources ==
- Atkin, Muriel (1980). Russia and Iran, 1780–1828. University of Minnesota Press. ISBN 978-0816609246.
- Axworthy, Michael (2010). A History of Iran: Empire of the Mind. Basic Books. ISBN 978-0465019205.
- Behrooz, Maziar (2013). "From confidence to apprehension: early Iranian interaction with Russia". In Cronin, Stephanie (ed.). Iranian-Russian Encounters: Empires and Revolutions Since 1800. Routledge. ISBN 978-0415624336.
- Bournoutian, George (2018). Armenia and Imperial Decline: The Yerevan Province, 1900-1914. Routledge. ISBN 978-1351062626.
- Kazemzadeh, Firuz (1991). "Iranian relations with Russia and the Soviet Union, to 1921". In Avery, Peter; Hambly, Gavin; Melville, Charles (eds.). The Cambridge History of Iran (Vol. 7). Cambridge University Press. ISBN 978-0521200950.
- Kettenhofen, Erich; Bournoutian, George A.; Hewsen, Robert H. (1998). "EREVAN". In Yarshater, Ehsan (ed.). Encyclopædia Iranica. Vol. VIII/5: English IV–Eršād al-zerāʿa. London and New York: Routledge & Kegan Paul. pp. 542–551. ISBN 978-1-56859-054-7.
- Rayfield, Donald (2013). Edge of Empires: A History of Georgia. Reaktion Books. ISBN 978-1780230702.
- Suny, Ronald Grigor (1994). The Making of the Georgian Nation. Indiana University Press. ISBN 978-0253209153.
- Tapper, Richard (1997). Frontier Nomads of Iran: A Political and Social History of the Shahsevan. Cambridge University Press. ISBN 978-0-52158-336-7.
- Tucker, Spencer C., ed. (2010). A Global Chronology of Conflict: From the Ancient World to the Modern Middle East. ABC-CLIO. ISBN 978-1851096725.
