= Mirza Baba =

Iranian painter 1785–1830

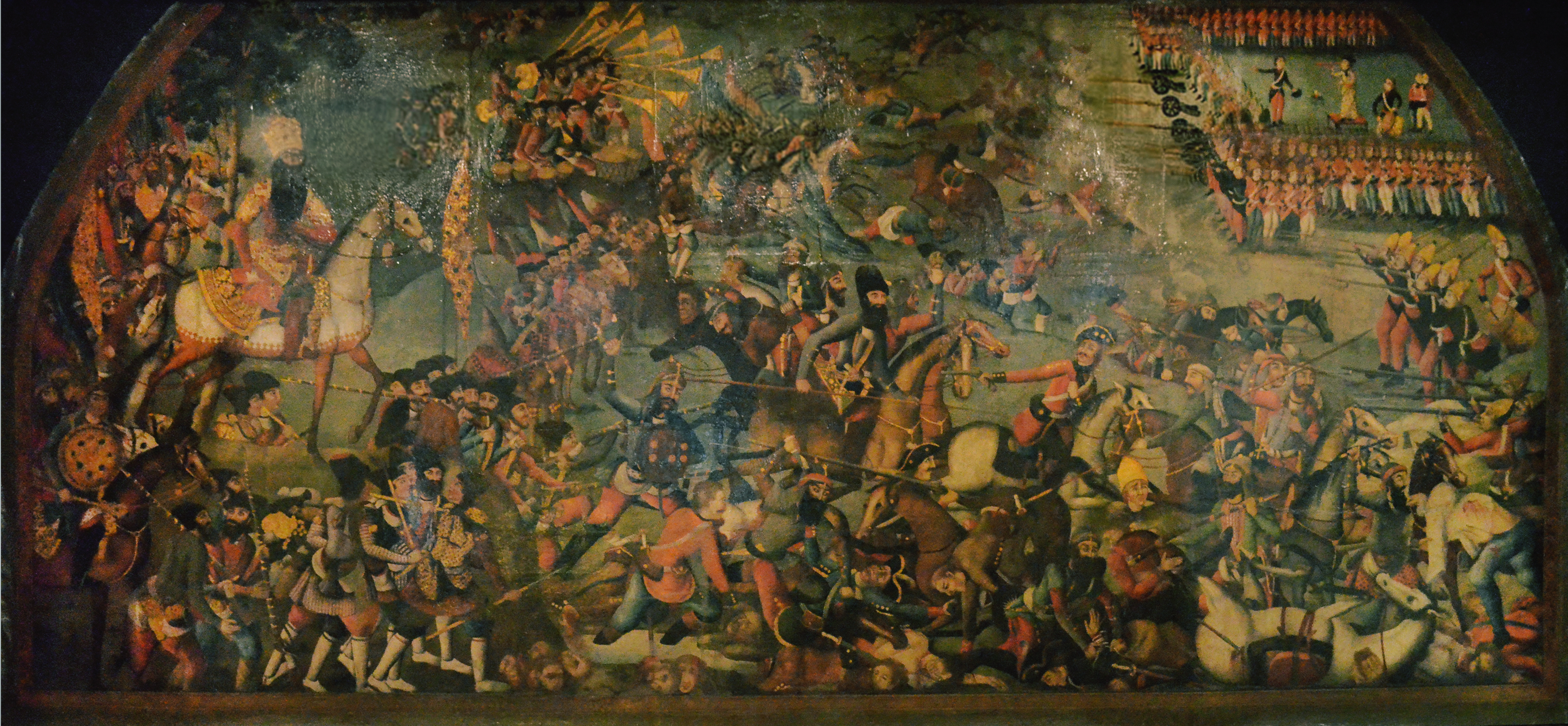
Depiction of the victory of Fath-Ali Shah Qajar against Imperial Russia at the siege of Erivan in 1804 by Mirza Baba. It is kept at the National Museum of Iran in Tehran.

Mirza Baba (Persian: میرزابابا; fl. 1785–c. 1830) was an Iranian painter from the Imami family of Isfahan, who worked at the court in Tehran during the reigns of Agha Mohammad Khan Qajar (r. 1789–1797) and Fath-Ali Shah Qajar (r. 1797–1834).

Mirza Baba and Mihr 'Ali were the most prominent painters of the first two decades of 19th-century Iran.

== Gallery ==
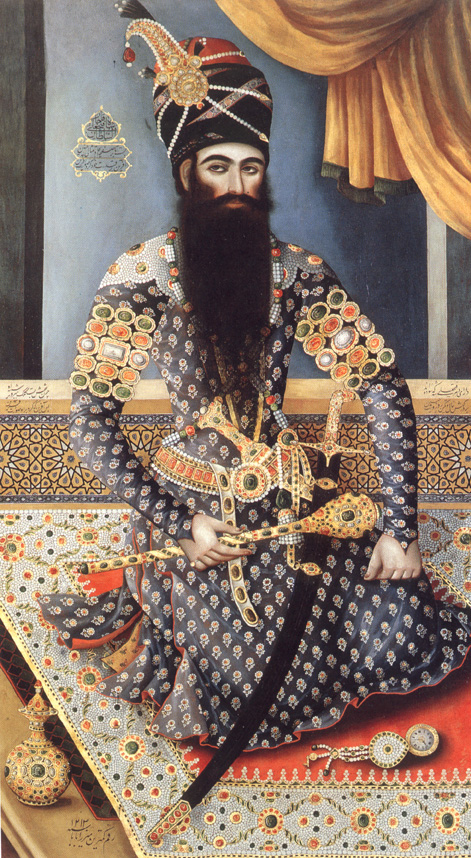
Portrait of Fath-Ali Shah Qajar, 1798/99

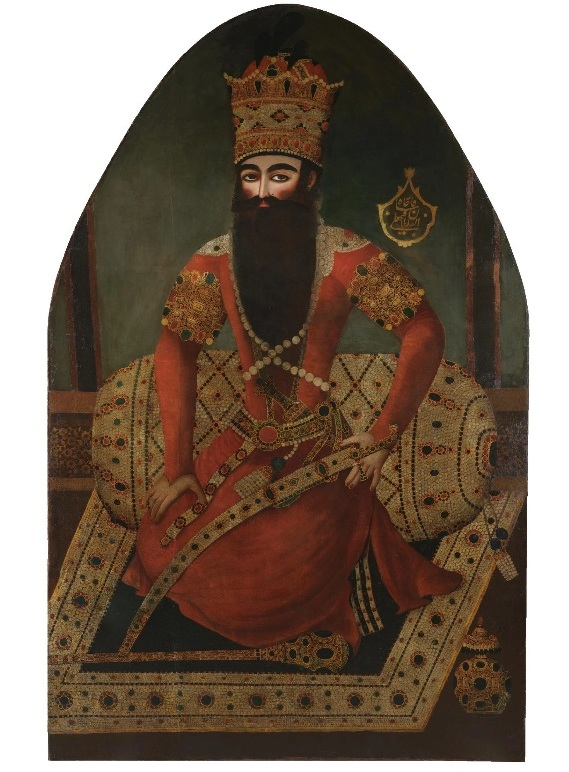
Portrait of Fath-Ali Shah Qajar, c. 1798

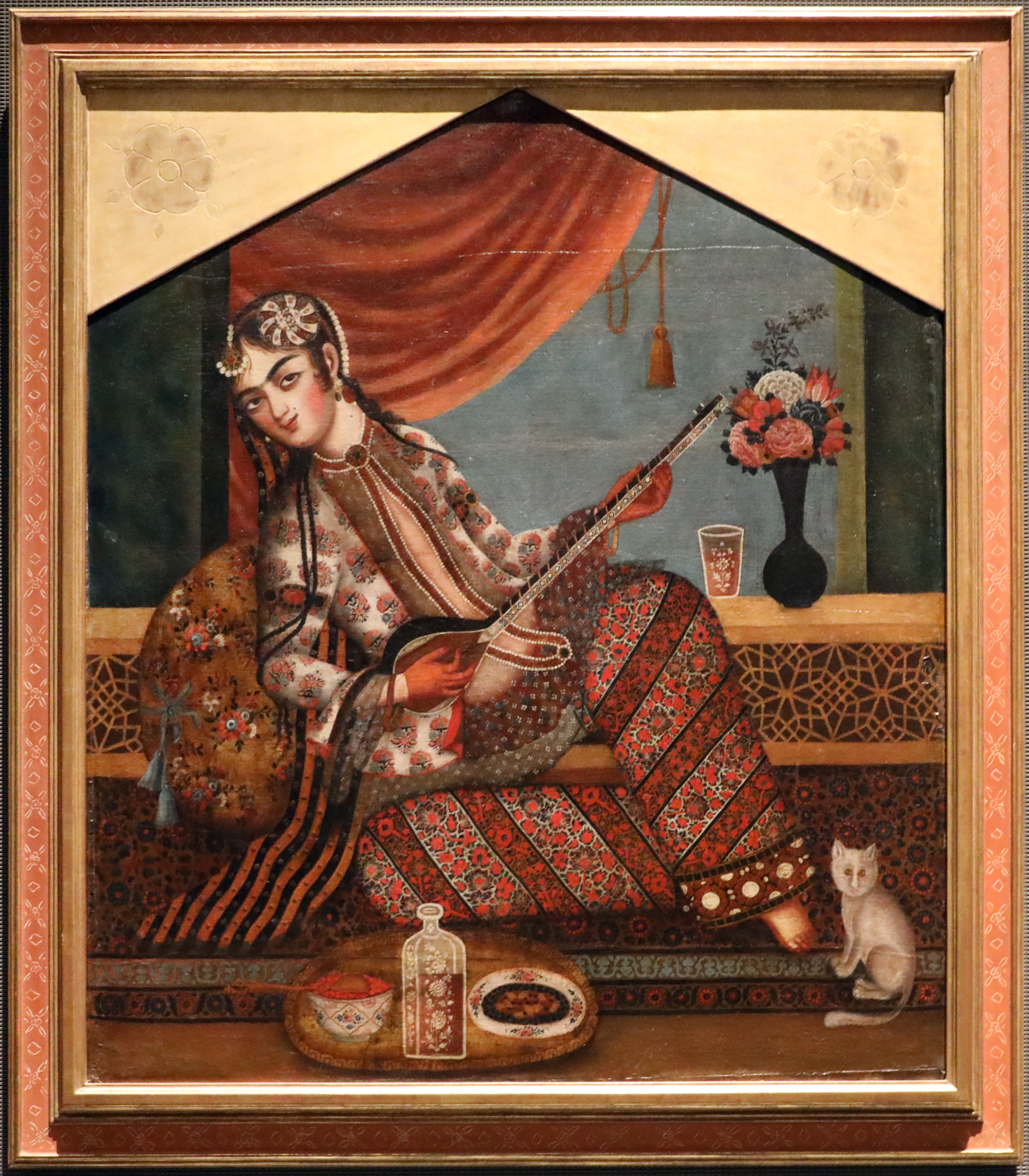
Portrait, 1790–1810

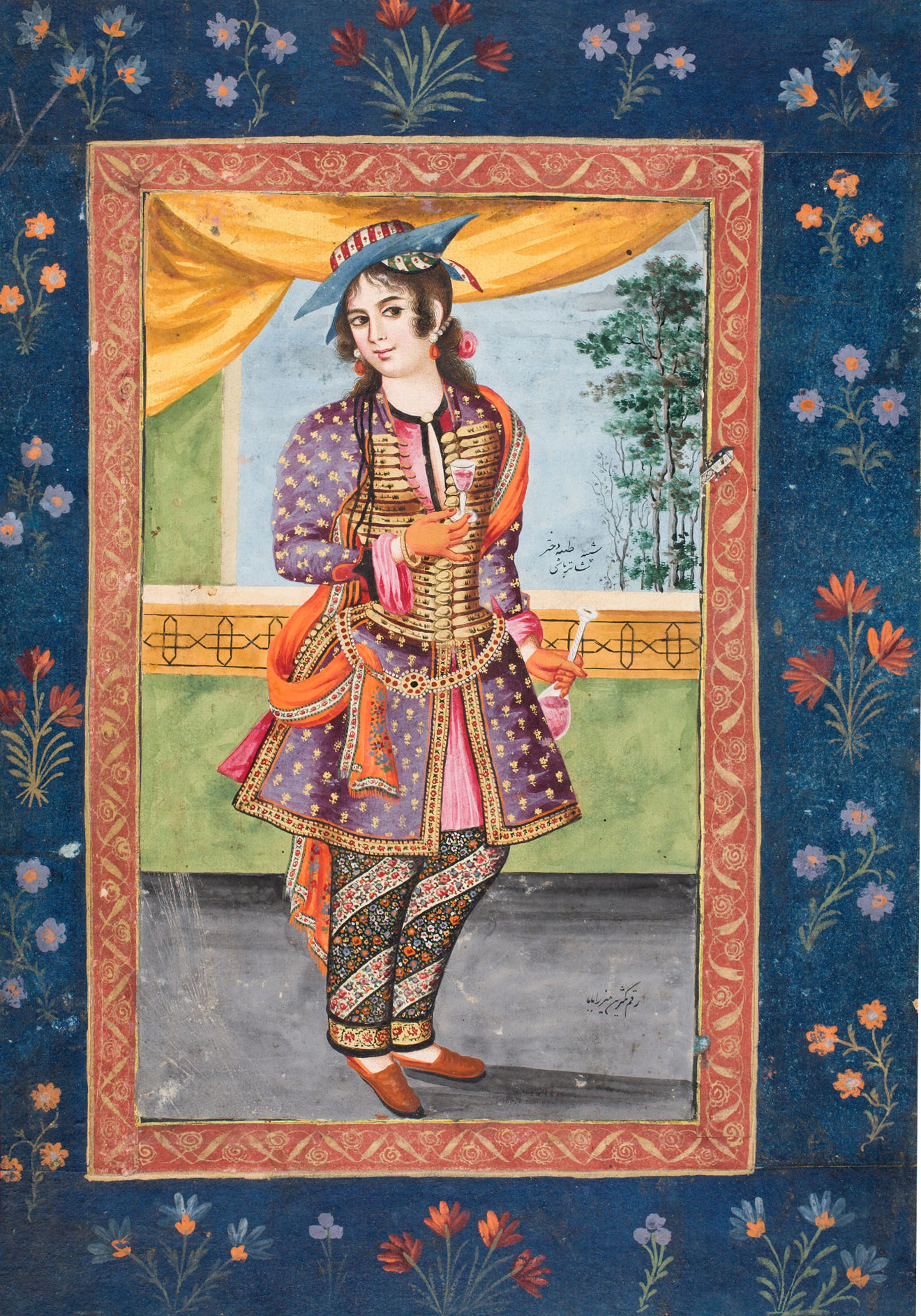
Woman with hennaed hands in Safavid costume, 1750–1830

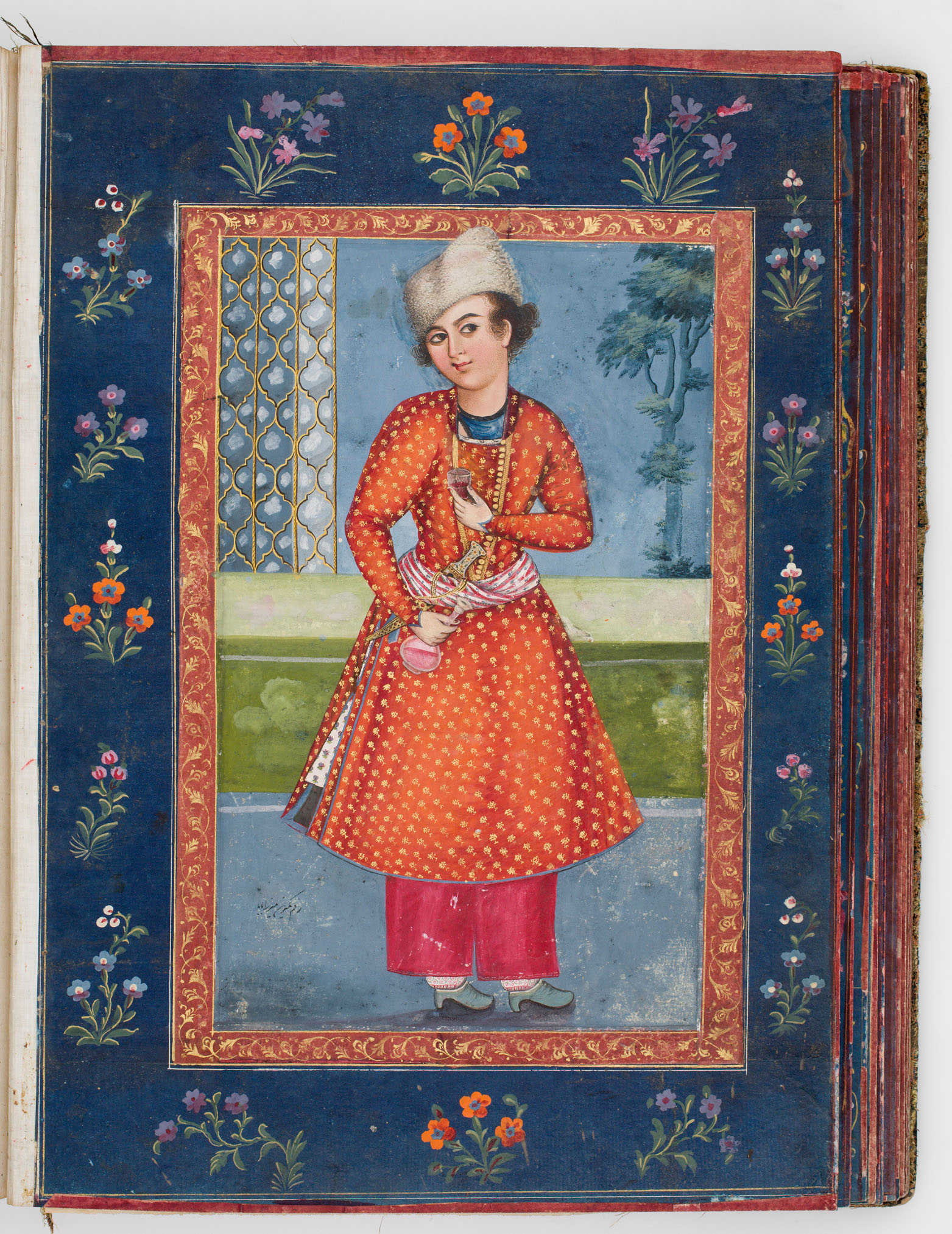
Simpering wine-boy in Qajar dress, 1750–1830

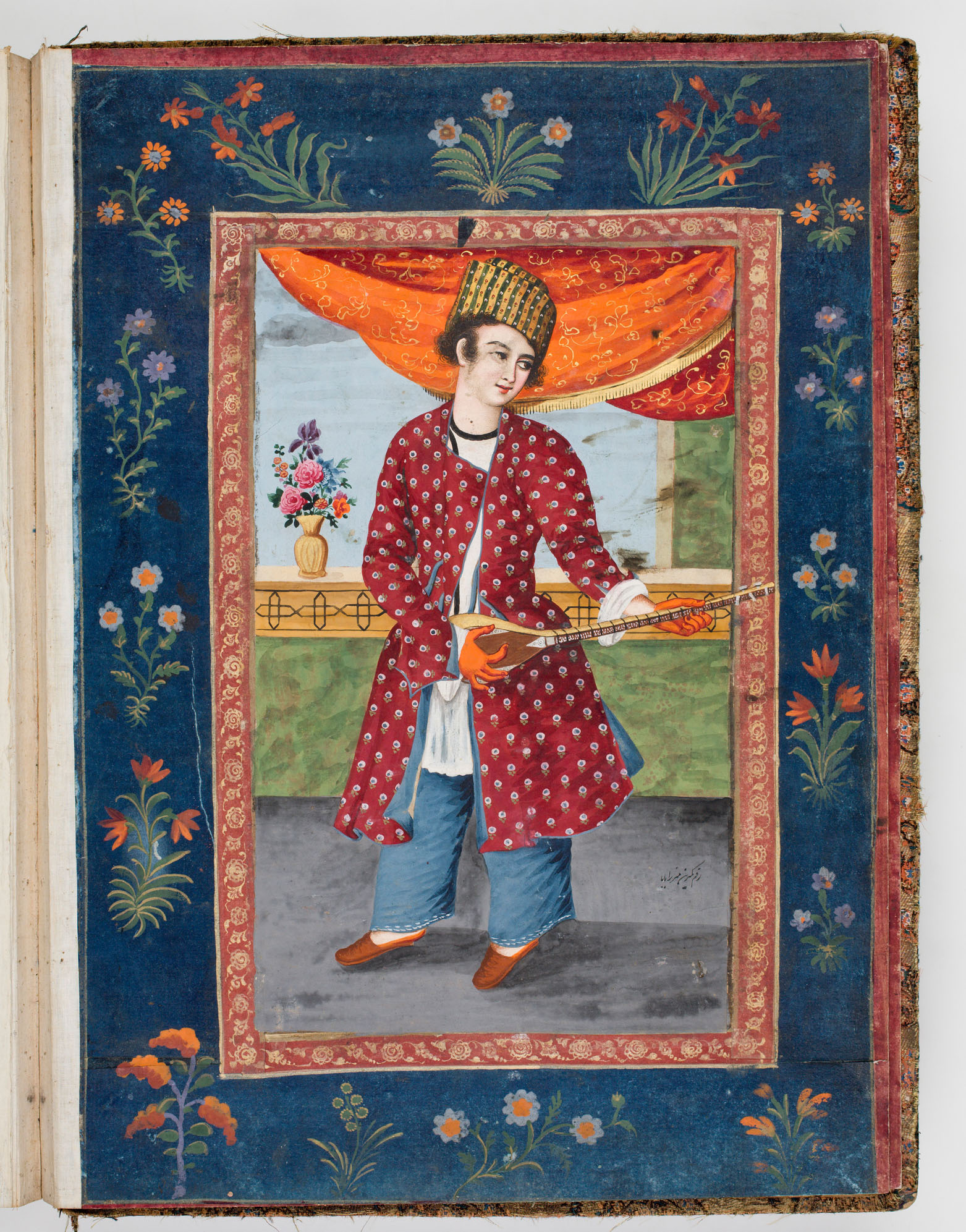
Youth with hennaed hands playing a stringed instrument, 1750–1830

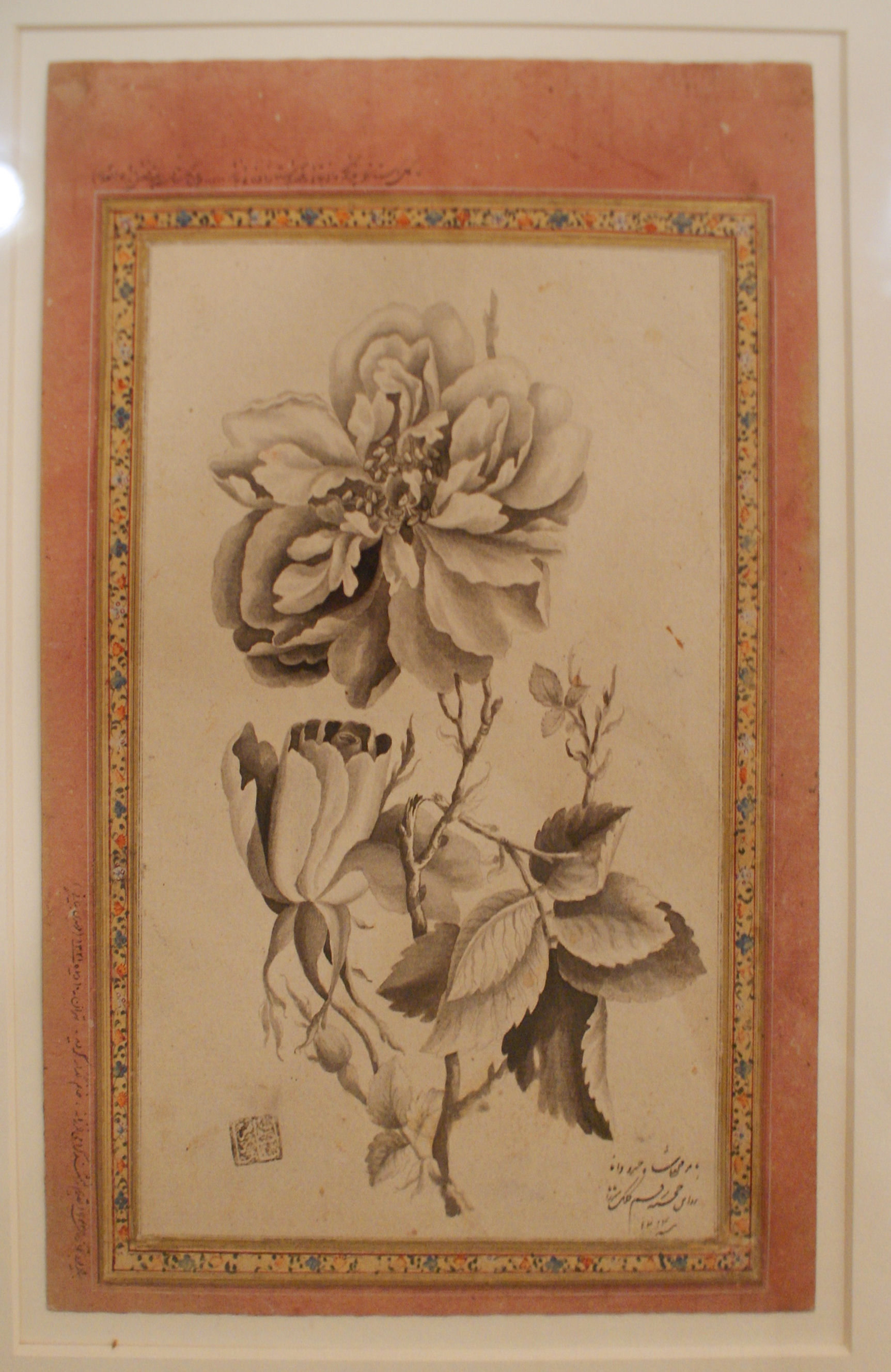
Rose, 1799–1800

== Sources ==
- Bloom, Jonathan; Blair, Sheila (2009). "Mirza Baba". Grove Encyclopedia of Islamic Art & Architecture: Three-Volume Set. Oxford University Press. ISBN 978-0195309911.
- Floor, Willem (1999). "Art (Naqqashi) and Artists (Naqqashan) in Qajar Persia". Muqarnas. 13. Brill: 125–154. JSTOR 1523268. (registration required)
