= Portnyagin =

Portnyagin (Russian: Портнягин), feminine: Portnyagina, is a Russian surname derived from the occupation of portnyaga, portnoy, meaning tailor. A variant of this surname is Pontryagin, explained the selectivity of the mutual positions of consonants in Russian language.

Notable people with the surname include:

- Igor Portnyagin (born 1989), Russian football player
- Paul Portnyagin (1903–1977), Russian Greek-Catholic priest, teacher and orientalist
