= Gudamaqari =

Gudamaqari გუდამაყარი Gudamakari
- Historical region
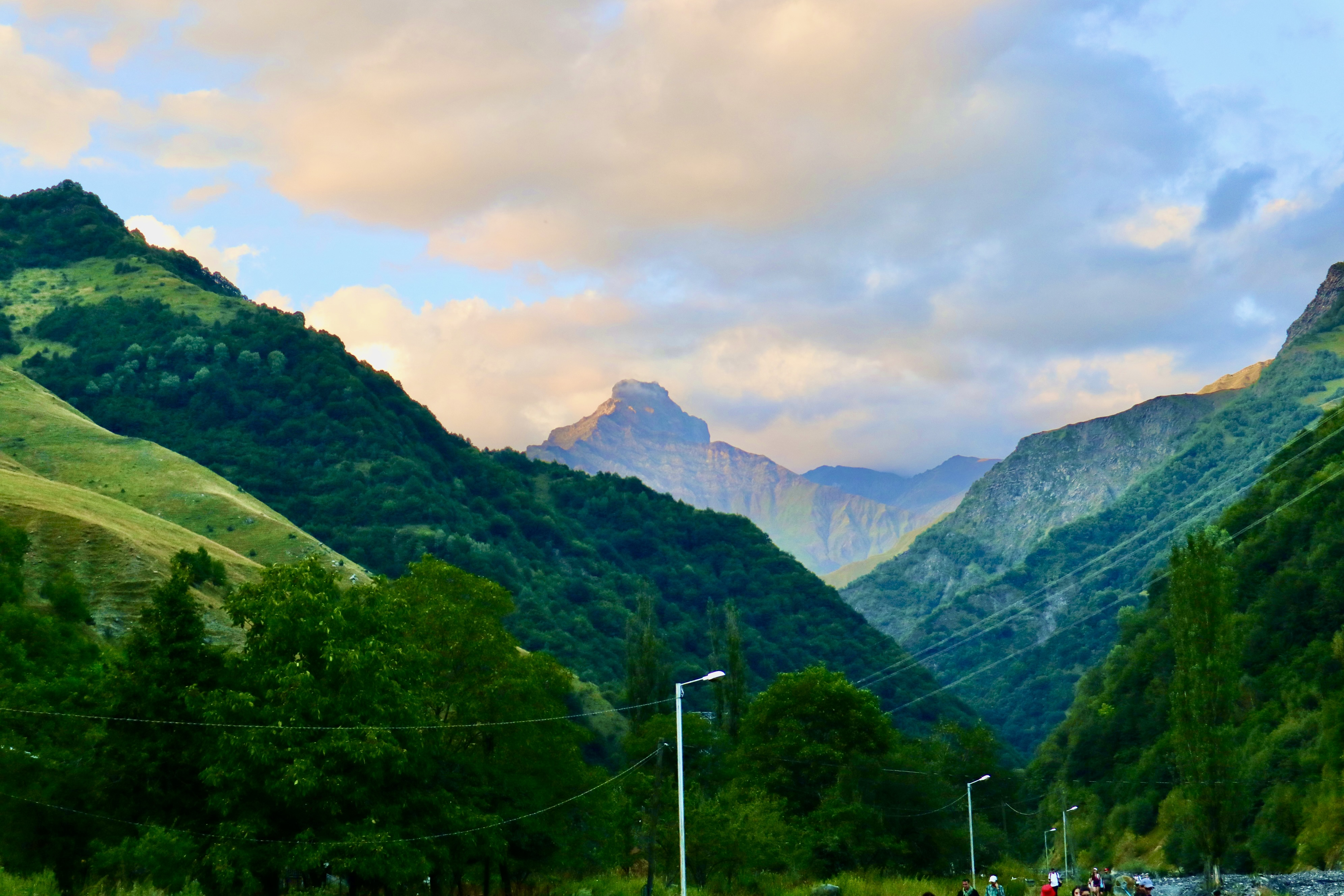

- Location within Mtskheta-Mtianeti Location within Georgia
- Coordinates: 42°26′16″N 44°45′00″E; An approximate geographical area.
- Country: Georgia
- Mkhare: Mtskheta-Mtianeti
- Capital: Bursachiri (village)

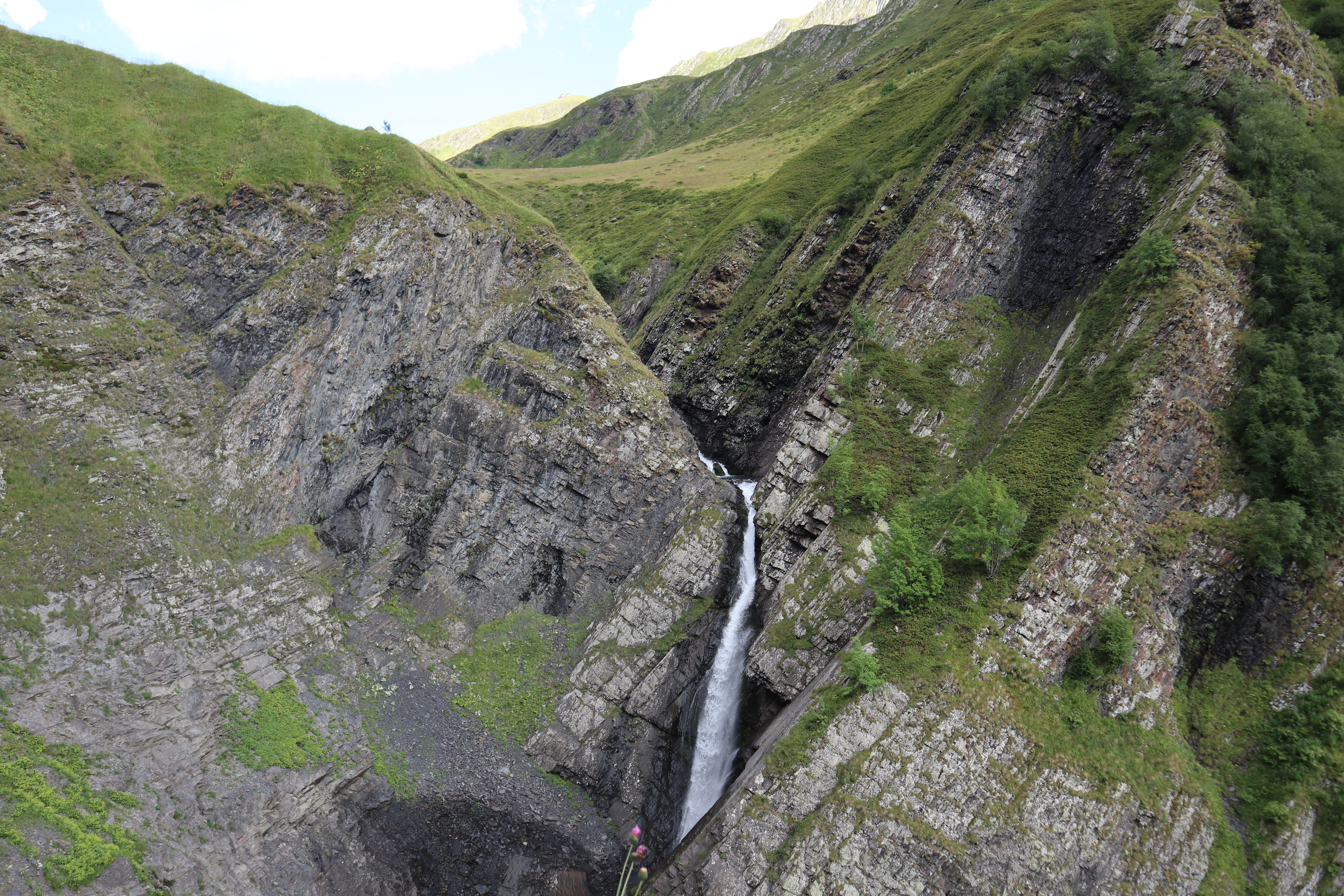
Bursachiri waterfall in the Gudamaqari canyon, reaching 2200 metres in altitude.

Gudamaqari or Gudamakari (Georgian: გუდამაყარი) is a small historical geographic area in northeast Georgia on the southern slopes of the Greater Caucasus Mountains. Located along the river valley of Aragvi, it is bordered by Mtiuleti on the west, Khevi on the north, Khevsureti and Pshavi on the east, and the Chartali communities on the south. Gudamaqari is sometimes viewed as a part of Mtiuleti. Modern administrative subdivision of Georgia places the area in the Mtskheta-Mtianeti mkhare (region).

== History ==
The inhabitants of Gudamaqari – Gudamaqarians (გუდამაყრელები) – are first chronicled by the 11th century Georgian historian Leonti Mroveli in connection with the conversion of Iberia/Kartli by St. Nino in the 330s. A strategic road running through this area played an important role in medieval Georgia and was much later, under the Imperial Russian rule, connected to the Georgian Military Road.
