= Mihr 'Ali =

Iranian painter

- مهرعلی نقاش
- Years active: 1795–1830
- Style: Qajar

Mihr 'Ali also spelt Mir Ali or Mehr Ali (Persian: مهرعلی نقاش; fl. 1795 – c. post 1830) was one of the great royal painters of the Qajar court during the reign of Fath-Ali Shah Qajar. Mihr 'Ali is regarded as the most notable Iranian portraitist of the early part of his reign and one of the foremost painters of early Qajar art. He was also a capable teacher, his pupils including the noted painter Abu'l-Hasan Sani al-Mulk.

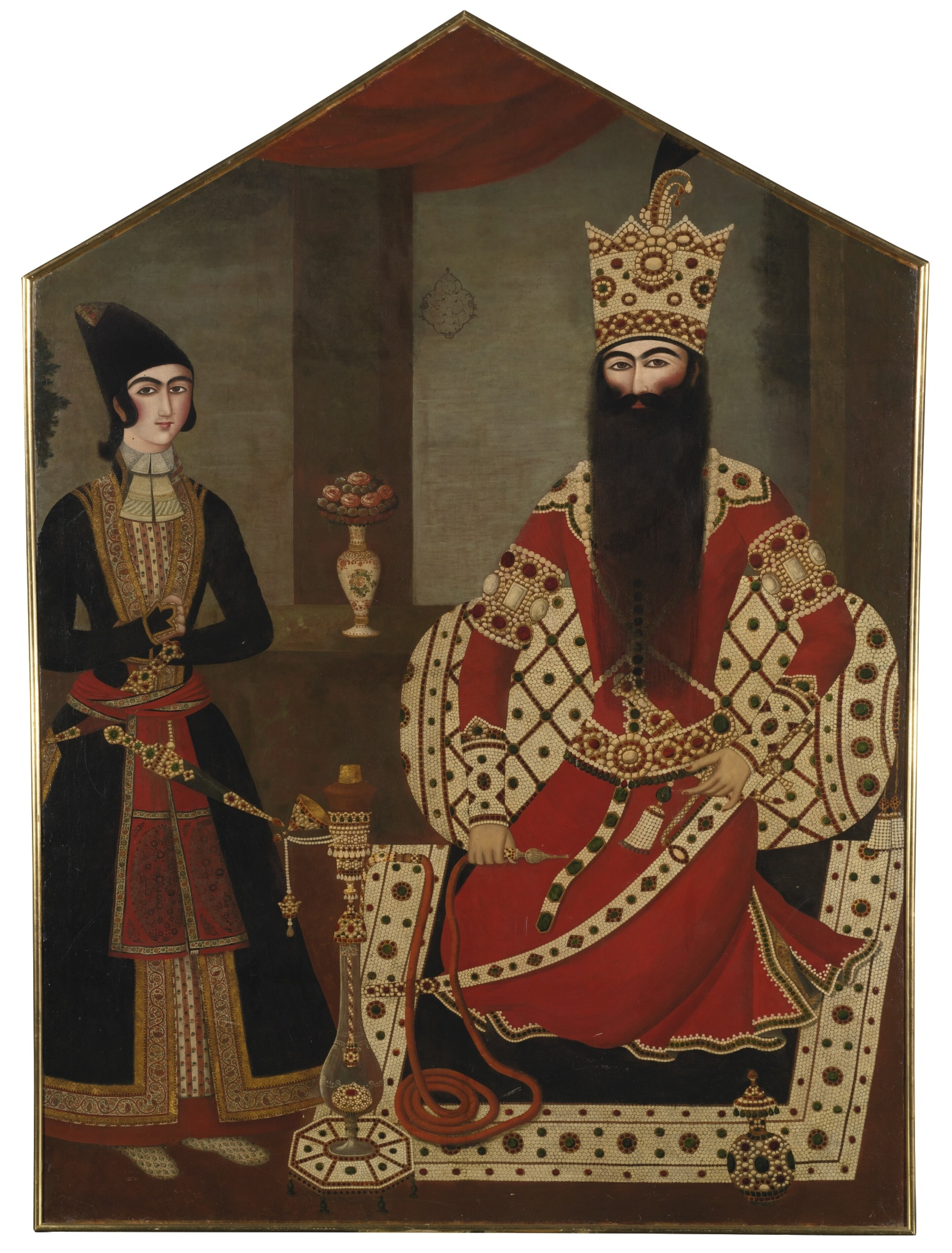
Portrait of Fath-Ali Shah Qajar attended by a prince, almost certainly Mohammad Mirza, attributed to Mihr 'Ali, c. 1820

== Works ==
Mihr 'Ali's chief skill was his ability to capture the portrait-sitter's grandeur and power, and as such he became a favourite painter of the Shah. Mihr 'Ali produced at least ten full-size oil paintings of Fat'h-Ali Shah, one of the earliest of which was probably sent as a present to the amirs of Sind in 1800. A further portrait, of the Shah enthroned, was sent to Napoleon. Mihr Ali's finest portrait is an 1813–4 work, regarded by some as the finest Persian oil painting in existence. It depicts a full-length portrait of the shah wearing a gold brocade robe and the Kiani Crown, while holding a jewelled staff.

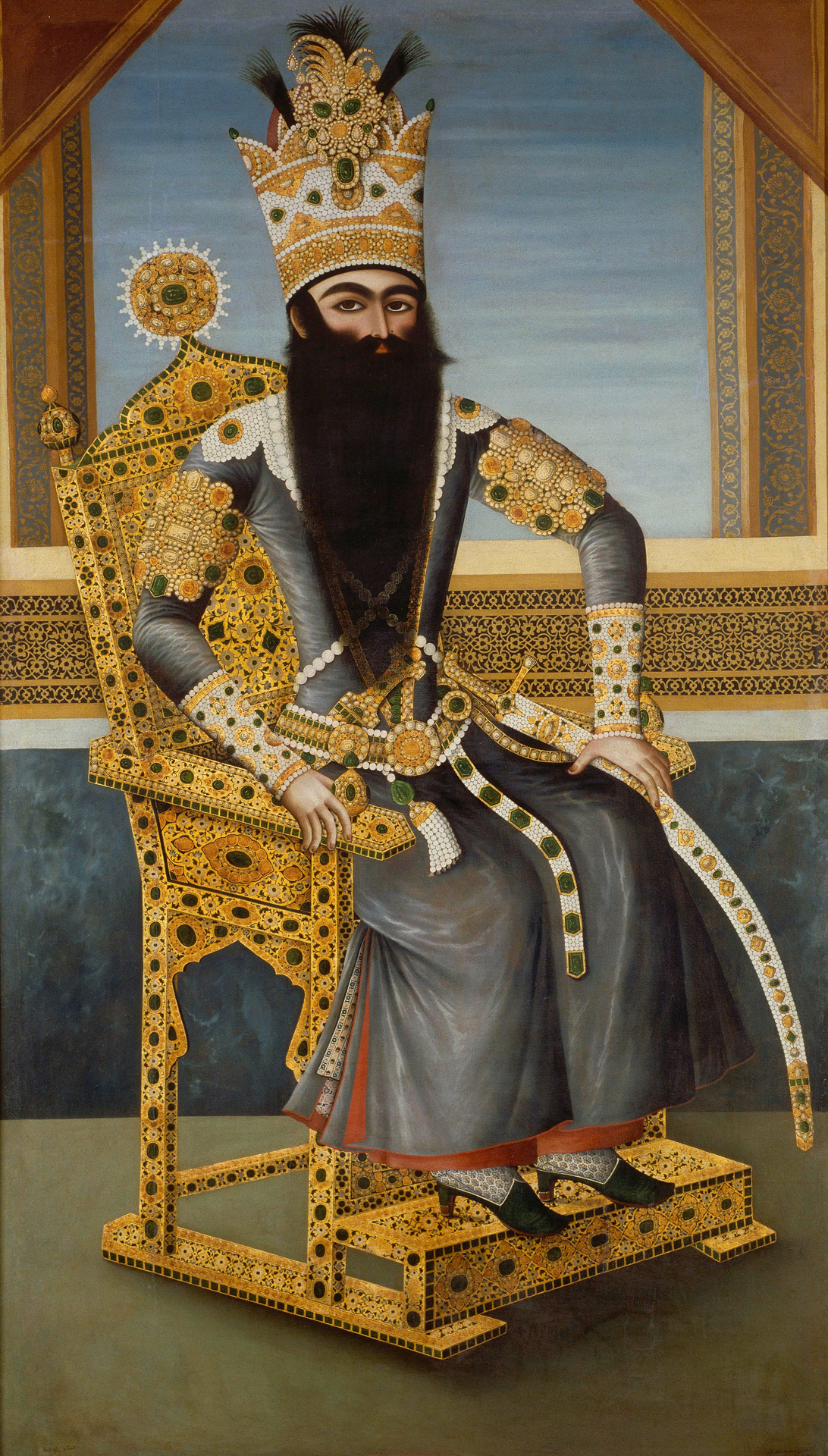
Portrait of Fath-Ali Shah Qajar attributed to Mihr 'Ali, 1800–1806, Louvre, Paris

Fat'h-Ali Shah commissioned great numbers of lifesize portraits of himself and his sons, works which formed the backdrop to court ceremonies. The works, painted by Mihr 'Ali and his predecessor as court painter, Mirza Baba, portrayed Fat'h-Ali Shah in his many stately roles, and were intended to show his power as a ruler rather than to be realistic portraits. As a result, the works are heavily stylised, are painted in rich, deep tones, and are filled with symbols of power.

Other important works by Mehr 'Ali include a series of portraits of rulers and figures from the Shahnameh, commissioned by Fat'h-Ali Shah as decoration for the 'Imarat-e Naw Palace in Isfahan. This series of works was notable enough to be mentioned in the reports of many of the European travellers to Isfahan, such as James Morier (in A Journey through Persia in the years 1808 and 1809, published in 1812), Sir William Ouseley in 1812 (in Travels into various Countries of the East, published in 1823), and Charles Texier (in Description de l'Arménie, la Perse et la Mesopotamie, published in 1852).

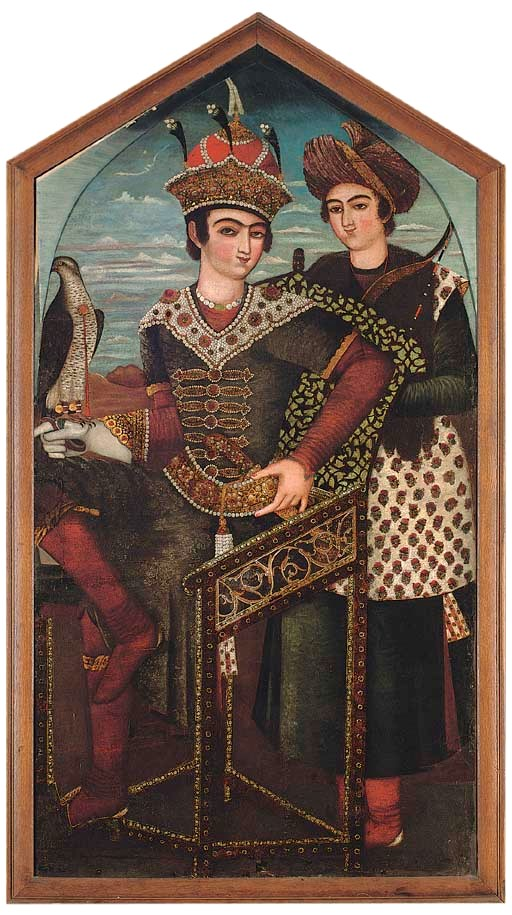
Portrait of Kay Khosrow, by Mihr 'Ali, 1803/4

Until 1985, it was thought that all of the paintings in this series had been destroyed, but three have since been discovered and authenticated, those being portraits of Afrasiyab, Genghis Khan, and Kay Khosrow, though the Kay Khosraw portrait does not exist in its full form but has been reduced to only some 80% of its original size. Despite this, it sold at auction at Christie's in London in 2007 for £54,000 ($US 107,500). The other two works are also in private hands, having been auctioned by the same company in 1987.

== Gallery ==
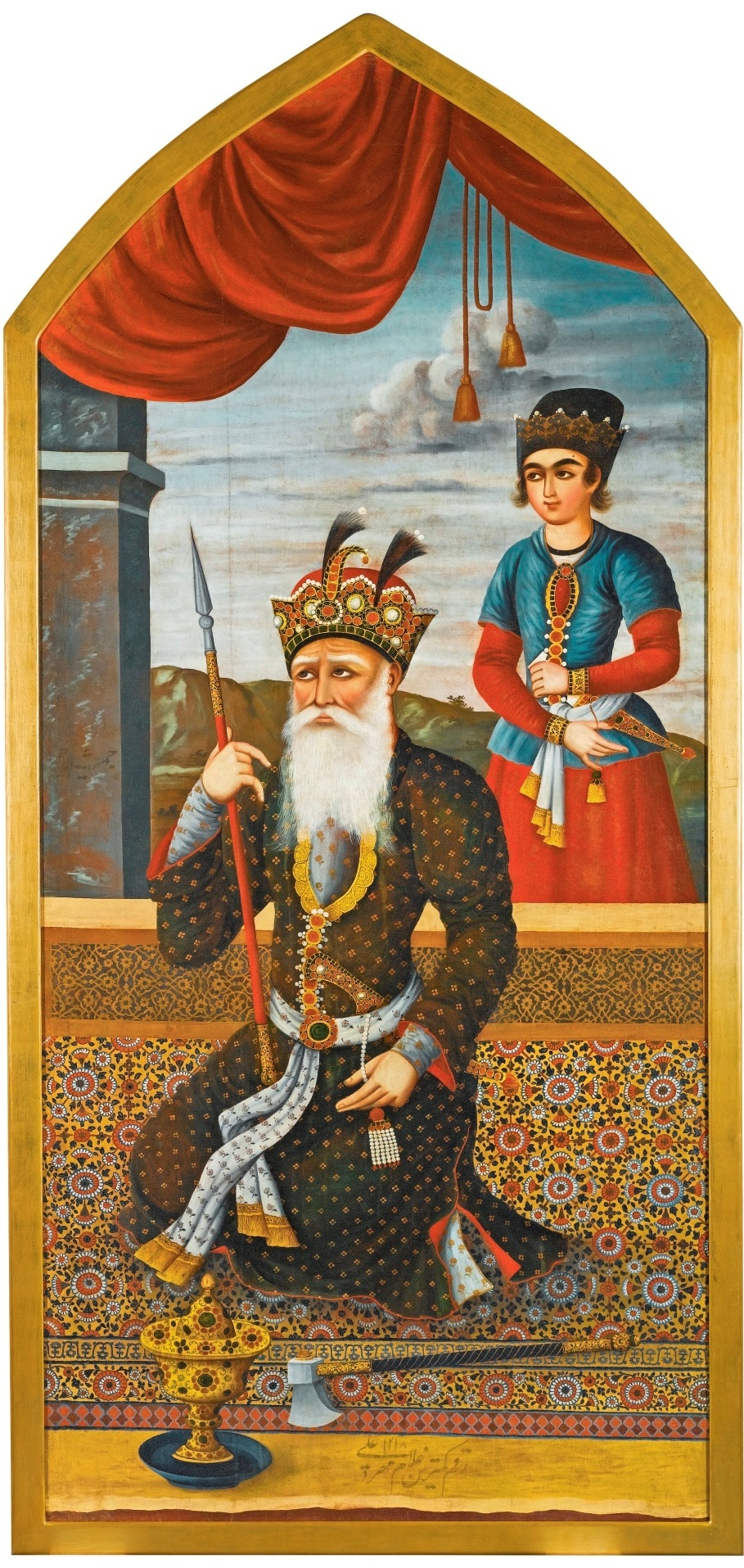
Portrait of King Jamshid signed by Mihr 'Ali, 1803

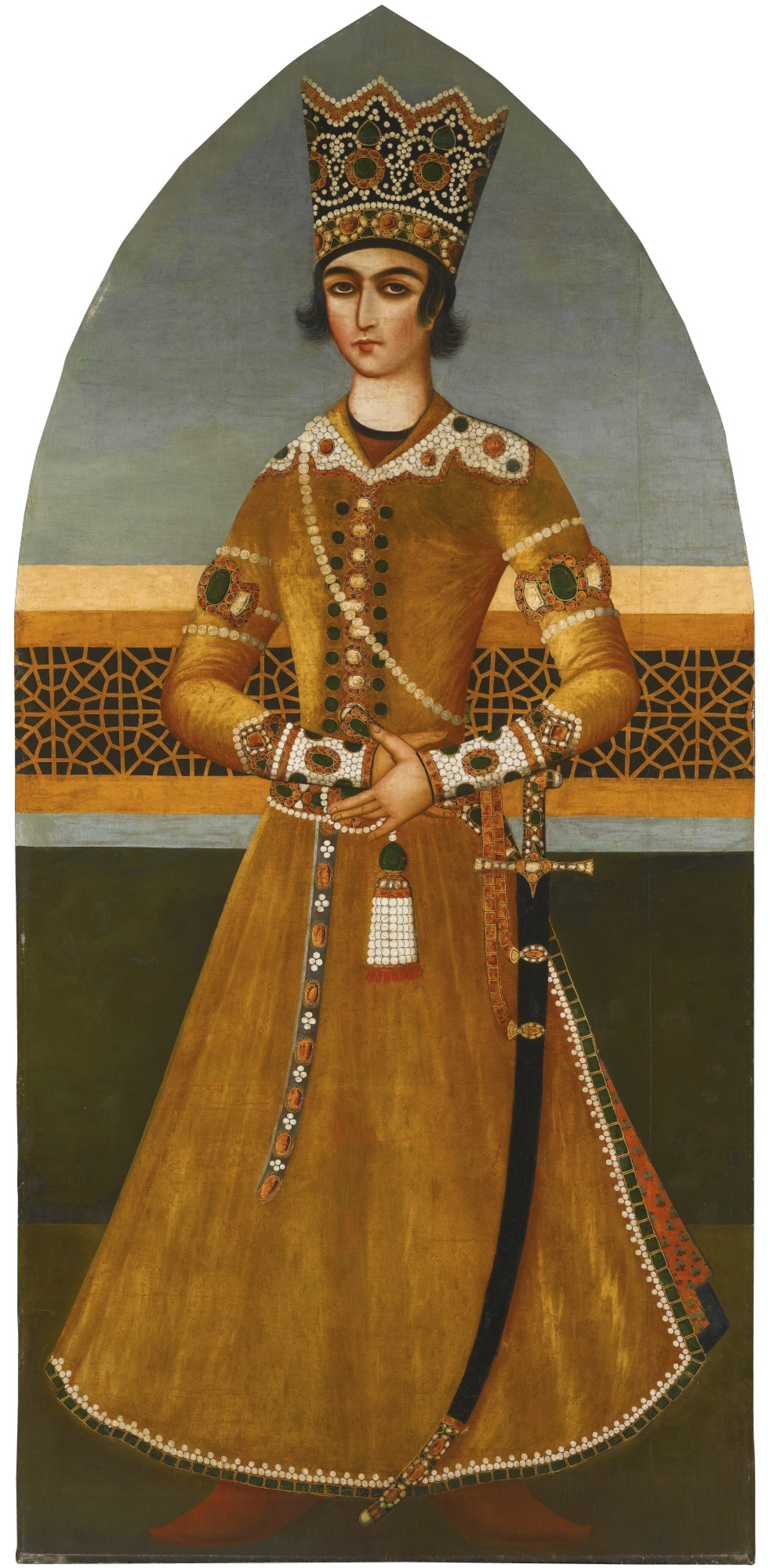
Portrait of Crown Prince Abbas Mirza, attributed to Mihr 'Ali, circa 1800

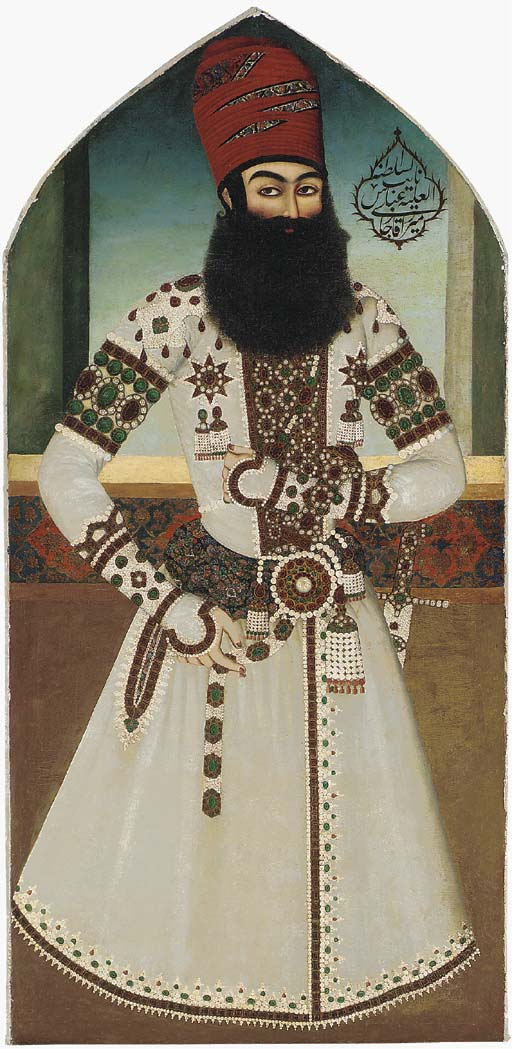
Portrait of Crown Prince Abbas Mirza, attributed to Mihr 'Ali, circa 1810–15

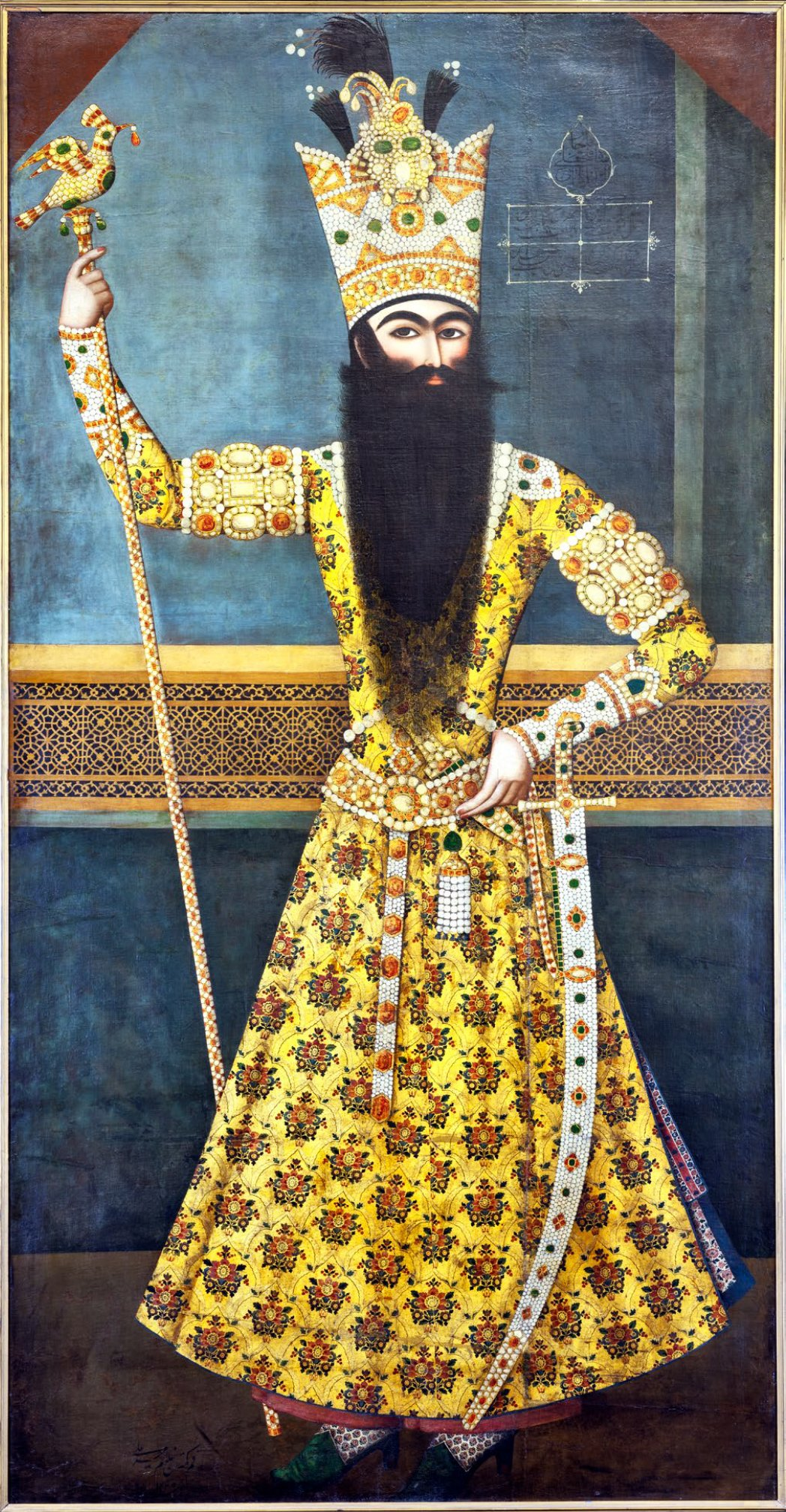
Painting of Fat'h-Ali Shah Qajar by Mihr 'Ali, 1813, Sa'dabad Complex, Tehran
