= 1804 Mtiuleti rebellion =

Mtiuleti rebellion
| Date | 1804 |
| Location | Mtiuleti, Georgia, Russian Empire |
| Result | Decisive Russian army victory |

Belligerents
| Georgian and Ossetian rebels | (Russia) Imperial Russian Army |

Strength
| 4,000 | Unknown |

Casualties and losses
- Hundreds of killed civilians

The 1804 Mtiuleti rebellion (Georgian: 1804 მთიულეთის აჯანყება, romanized: 1804 mtiuletis ajanq'eba) was a conflict in Mtiuleti region of the former Kingdom of Kartli-Kakheti (eastern Georgia), at that time part of the Georgia Governorate of the Russian Empire. It was the first major Georgian rebellion directed against the Russian administration.

== Background ==
In 1801, the Russians capitalized on the moment, and annexed the Kingdom of Kartli-Kakheti. The entity was then reduced to the status of a Russian region (Georgia Governorate). Though the Russian administration brought some peace, Kartli-Kakheti remained troubled.

== Rebellion ==
It broke out at a vulnerable spot, to the west of the Darial Pass. A number of local Ossetians had complained about the grain and meat demands of Cossacks stationed in the area. They were thrown into a pit. The Cossacks then proceeded to punish more locals; peasants were put to forced labour, two men were killed by whip lashing, women were mistreated, and cattle was worked to death.

The people of the Aragvi valley then attacked the troops of Dmitri Mikhailovich Volkonsky, killing several of them. They then proceeded to occupy several of the forts on the nearby main road. In the summer of 1804, 4,000 Georgian and Ossetian rebels requested Prince Parnaoz to lead them. On 3 August 1804, the rebels and Russian forces clashed at Lomisi; the Russian forces reportedly only escaped defeat due to the "timidity" of the Kakhetian nobles and the return of Russian General Pavel Tsitsianov, who had just unsuccessfully besieged Erivan. The rebellion was eventually crushed; hundreds of highlanders were bayoneted or imprisoned. It would take eight years before more anti-Russian violence erupted. A part of the Georgian nobles participated in the 1804 Mtiuleti rebellion.

== Sources ==
- Rayfield, Donald (2012). Edge of Empires: A History of Georgia. Reaktion Books. ISBN 978-1780230702.
- Suny, Ronald Grigor (1994). The Making of the Georgian Nation. Indiana University Press. ISBN 978-0253209153.
