= Pavel Tsitsianov =

Russian general (1754–1806)

Prince Pavel Tsitsianov
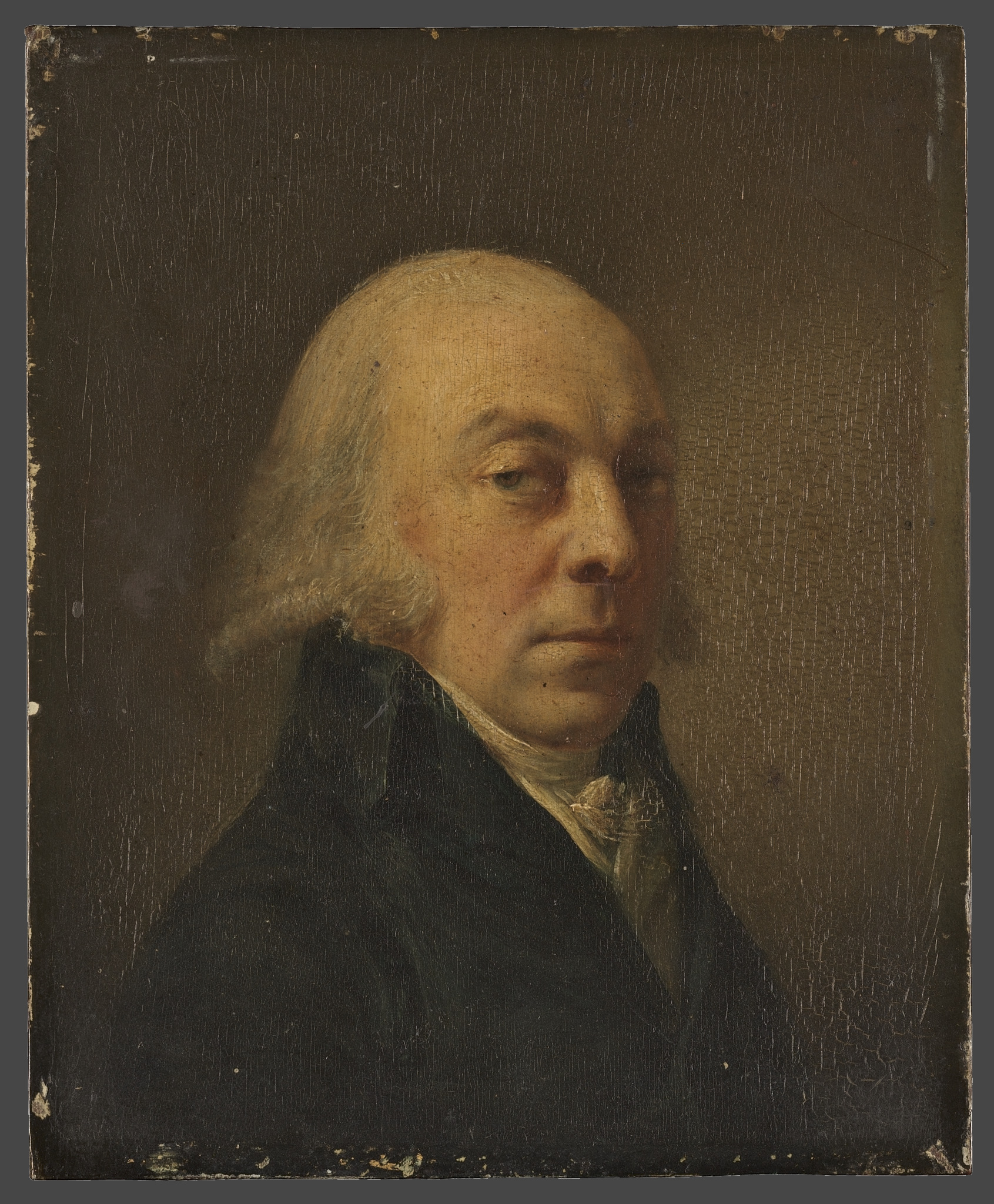
- Portrait by Salvatore Tonci

Commander-in-chief in Georgia
- In office 1802–1806
- Preceded by: Karl Knorring
- Succeeded by: Ivan Gudovich

Military governor of the Astrakhan Governorate
- In office 1802–1806
- Preceded by: Karl Knorring
- Succeeded by: Ivan Gudovich

Personal details
- Born: 19 September 1754 Moscow, Russian Empire
- Died: 20 February 1806 (aged 51) near Baku, Baku Khanate
- Resting place: Sioni Cathedral, Tbilisi
- Awards: Order of St. George (3rd class); Order of St. Vladimir (twice, 1st and 3rd class); Order of Saint Alexander Nevsky; Gold Sword for Bravery

Military service
- Rank: General of the Infantry (1804)
- Unit: Preobrazhensky Life Guards Regiment
- Commands: Saint Petersburg Grenadier Regiment; Commandant of Baku; Suzdal Musketeer Regiment; Tobolsk Musketeer Regiment; Commander in chief of Russian troops in Georgia; Inspector of the Caucasian Line
- Battles/wars: Russo-Turkish War; Kościuszko Uprising; Persian Expedition of 1796; Russo-Persian War †; Siege of Ganja (1804); Battle of Echmiadzin (1804); Siege of Erivan (1804)

Prince Pavel Dmitriyevich Tsitsianov (Russian: Па́вел Дми́триевич Цициа́нов; (Note: Written Павелъ Дмитріевичъ Циціановъ in pre-reform Russian orthography) 19 September [O.S. 8 September] 1754–20 February [O.S. 8 February] 1806) was a Russian general of Georgian noble origin who played a prominent role in the Russian conquest of the South Caucasus. He served as the commander-in-chief in the Caucasus from 1802 to 1806 and commanded Russian forces in the Russo-Persian War of 1804–1813 until his assassination near Baku in 1806.

Born in Moscow to a Georgian noble family that had lived in Russia for two generations, he entered military service at a young age and fought in the Russo-Turkish War of 1768–1774, the 1794 Polish uprising and the Persian expedition of 1796. Tsar Alexander I appointed him commander of Russian forces in the Caucasus in 1802. He solidified Russian rule in the region, compelling local rulers and communities to submit to the Tsar and often campaigning against them. He expanded Russian possessions south of the Caucasus westward to the Black Sea and continued Russia's southward expansion. He successfully captured the city of Ganja (in modern-day Azerbaijan), triggering a conflict with Qajar Iran. He then continued south into the Erivan Khanate (in modern-day Armenia), where his outnumbered forces fought a number of battles with the Iranian army but were forced to retreat. He secured the submission of a number of the khanates of the Caucasus to Russian rule. In February 1806, he attempted to negotiate the surrender of the Khanate of Baku but was lured into a trap by the local khan and killed.

Tsitsianov has been credited with playing a foundational role in establishing Russian rule in the South Caucasus; he was universally lauded in Russian sources and often admired by Europeans as well. He has been described as a brave and energetic leader but also as cruel and overbearing. He was despised and feared by many Caucasian Muslims and Iranians for his brutal actions. He held all "Asiatics" in contempt and believed that force and assimilation were the only reliable means to secure Russian control over local populations. Many of his methods were followed by later Russian leaders in the Caucasus. According to Walter Richmond, Tsitsianov "set in motion the brutality that was the hallmark of subsequent Russian efforts to conquer the North Caucasus."

== Family and early career ==
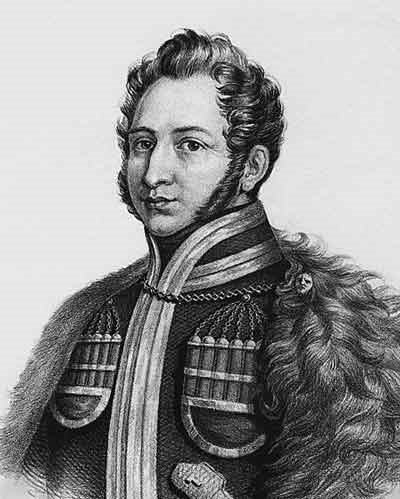
Tsitsianov in his younger years

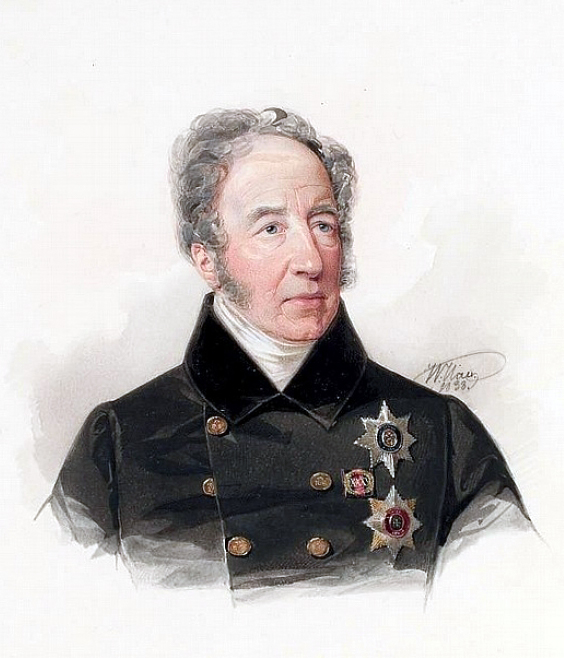
Pavel's younger brother Mikhail

Tsitsianov was born in Moscow into the noble Georgian family of Tsitsishvili. He was related to the Georgian royal dynasty. His father, Dmitry Pavlovich, was a writer and state official. His grandfather, Paata or Papuna, had moved to Russia in the early 1700s as part of a group of Georgian émigrés accompanying the exiled Georgian monarch Vakhtang VI. Tsitsianov had a younger brother, Mikhail Dmitrievich Tsitsianov, a Senator of the Russian Empire.

Tsitsianov began his career in the Preobrazhensky Regiment of the Imperial Guard in 1772. He was promoted to colonel in 1785, and in 1786, he was appointed colonel of a grenadier regiment. He participated in the Russo-Turkish War (1787–92). During that war, he fought at Khotin, the Salchea River, Ismail, and Bender. He was promoted to brigadier in 1790 and major general in 1793. He also served in Poland during the 1794 uprising, for which he received the Order of St. George, third class, and the Order of St. Vladimir, third class.

In 1796, Tsitsianov participated in Persian Expedition of 1796 under the command of Count Valerian Zubov. The expedition was called off by Catherine the Great's successor Paul I, who disfavored the men who had risen to high positions under his mother's reign. Tsitsianov temporarily left military service for health reasons in September 1797. He remained jobless for the duration of Paul's reign. The new emperor Alexander I appointed him to the Chancellery of the State Council in May 1801 and promoted him to lieutenant general in late 1801.

== Rule in Georgia and wars in the Caucasus ==
In 1802 Tsitsianov was appointed the commander of Russian forces in Georgia (Eastern Georgia had just been annexed by Russia), inspector of the Caucasian Line, and military governor of the Astrakhan Governorate. In effect, he was given absolute authority over all Russian forces in the Caucasus. His rule was characterized by uncompromising policies towards the locals, including the exile of the remaining members of Georgia's former ruling dynasty to Russia. Philip Longworth describes Tsitsianov as "proud, brave and cruel, a dashing man of action, subservient to no one – not even the Tsar." He received broad discretionary powers from the Tsar and further solidified Russian rule in Georgia. He upgraded the Georgian Military Road, which connected Tiflis (Tbilisi) with Russia over the Caucasus Mountains, and constructed the fortress of Alexandrovsk on the Alazani River. In Western Georgia, he secured the submission of Prince Grigol Dadiani of Mingrelia, who had revolted against King Solomon II of Imereti. Unable to negotiate the cession of the Black Sea port of Poti, he built the fortress of Redoubt Kali on the Mingrelian coast.

Tsitsianov initiated a number of social and administrative reforms in Georgia. He largely preserved the traditional social hierarchy, confirming the rights of the nobility and returning lands that had been confiscated by the Georgian kings. The bourgeoisie was supported in order to promote trade and the start of industry. However, new enterprises were limited by wars and local unrest, and Russian rule in Georgia was creating considerable expenses for the state. Tsitsianov also founded a school in Tiflis for the sons of nobles. The city, which had been sacked in 1795, was gradually restored, and a number of new public buildings were built. Tsitsianov favored a slower adoption of Russian methods of administration and kept Georgian as a local official language. In 1804, when Minister of the Interior Viktor Kochubey wrote to him proposing the restoration of a Bagrationi prince as a vassal ruler of Georgia, Tsitsianov firmly rejected the idea.

Tsitsianov forced the mountain peoples of the Caucasus to swear loyalty to the Tsar. He ordered expeditions against the communities of Jar-Balakan, which had been raiding Kakheti, and the Ossetians. Tsitsianov often used threats and insults in his communications with Caucasian elites. For example, when one of his generals was killed in battle with the Jar-Balakanis, his rage knew no bounds, and he wrote an angry letter to their ally, the Sultan of Elisu: "Shameless sultan with the soul of a Persian—so you still dare to write to me! Yours is the soul of a dog and the understanding of an ass, yet you think to deceive me with your specious phrases. Know that until you become a loyal vassal of my Emperor I shall only long to wash my boots in your blood." According to one view, these insults and threats were used deliberately to provoke revolts which could then be crushed. Tsitsianov held all "Asiatics" in contempt and believed that force and assimilation, rather than the accommodation of local vassals, were the only reliable means to secure Russian control over local populations. Many of his methods were followed by later Russian leaders in the Caucasus. He had strong negative feelings towards Muslims in general (whom he considered treacherous) and the "Persians" in particular and held in contempt everything related to Iran.

== Russo-Persian War of 1804–1813 ==
Tsitsianov intended to expand Russia's possessions south of the Caucasus to the Black and Caspian seas and southwards into Iran, even as far as Tabriz if possible. In early 1804, he attacked and conquered Ganja, triggering the Russo-Persian War of 1804–1813. He renamed the city Yelizavetpol, after the Tsar's wife Elizabeth. According to Maziar Behrooz, Tsitsianov's conquest of Ganja, which reduced the city to rubble and resulted in the murder of its governor, Javad Khan, his son, and many of the city's defenders and civilian population, was no less brutal and murderous than Qajar ruler Agha Mohammad Khan Qajar's sack of Tiflis in 1795. Between 1,500 and 3,000 inhabitants were killed, including 500 local warriors who had sheltered in a mosque. For this victory, Tsitsianov received the rank of General of the Infantry. After the victory at Ganja, Tsitsianov returned to Georgia and forced King Solomon of Imereti to swear allegiance to the Tsar.

In the summer of 1804, Tsitsianov advanced against the Persian forces in Persian Armenia, and fought at Gyumri, Etchmiadzin, on the Zangu River, and finally Yerevan. His actions earned him the Order of St. Vladimir, first class. In May 1805, he secured the submission of the Karabakh Khanate to Russian suzerainty, signing the Treaty of Kurekchay with Ibrahim Khalil Khan of Karabakh. The same year, the khanates of Shaki, Shamakhi and the sultanate of Shoragel were cowed into submission by Tsitsianov. In July 1805, Tsitsianov successfully fought off a Persian invasion north of the Aras River and conducted counteroffensive in the fall. He then established Russian rule over Shirvan in January 1806.

== Death and related myth ==
In February 1806, Tsitsianov arrived outside Baku. The Khan of Baku agreed to meet Tsitsianov to accept his demands for submission. Tsitsianov rode up to the city walls, accompanied only by his aide-de-camp Prince Eristov and a Cossack. The khan, accompanied by four men, came out to meet Tsitsianov about a hundred paces from the fortress. When the general was about to receive the keys to the city from the khan, the khan's men unexpectedly shot him and his aide-de-camp. Tsitsianov's head and both hands were cut off and, according to some accounts, sent to Fath-Ali Shah in Tehran. The third member of the small mission escaped to relate the gruesome tale. Tsitsianov's body was left in a ditch near the city walls and remained there until Russian forces captured Baku a few months later. His remains were first buried in Baku's Armenian church. Five years later, they were reinterred in the Tbilisi Sioni Cathedral.

Tsitsianov's death is the subject of a story about Mirza Mohammad Akhbari, a teacher of Akhbari school of fiqh (Islamic jurisprudence) in Tehran, who allegedly promised Fath-Ali Shah Qajar to secure the death of Tsitsianov by supernatural means. Retreating for a period of forty days to the shrine at Shah-Abdol-Azim, he began to engage in certain magical practices, such as beheading wax figures representing Tsitsianov. After the general was in fact assassinated, his severed head (or, according to some accounts, hand) arrived in Tehran just before the forty days were up. Because Fath-Ali Shah feared that the supernatural powers of Mirza Mohammad might be turned against him, he exiled him to Arab Iraq.

== Legacy and reputation ==
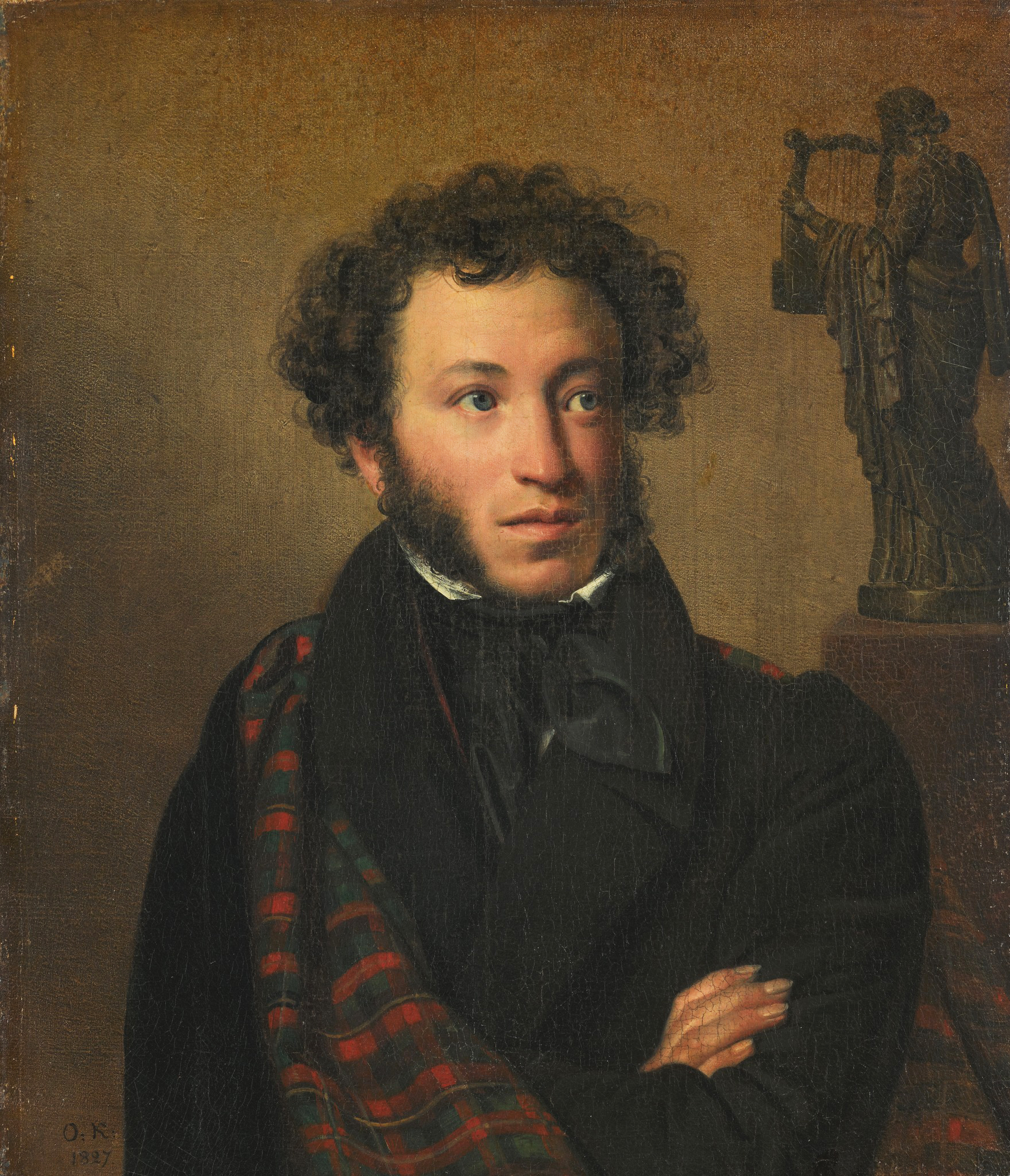
Tsitsianov's fiery character is mentioned in a laudatory passage in Pushkin's romantic poem The Prisoner of the Caucasus.

Tsitsianov's achievements and death at Baku secured his place in Russian memory. Russian sources universally lauded him, and he was often admired by Europeans as well. In the imperial-era Russian Biographical Dictionary, Tsitsianov is credited with bringing stability to Georgia, greatly expanding Russia's borders, and "instill[ing] respect among the Caucasian rulers for Russian arms." Authors such as Vasily Potto and N. N. Belyavsky praised his character, resolve, vision and dedication to Russian interests, while John F. Baddeley described him as a brave and energetic leader and noted his "aggressive, over-bearing spirit, that served him admirably in his dealings with the native rulers, Christian as well as Mussulman though probably enough it contributed both to his own tragic fate." The Russian poet Alexander Pushkin referred to Tsitsianov in a laudatory passage of his poem The Prisoner of the Caucasus:

И воспою тот славный час,
Когда, почуя бой кровавый,
На негодующий Кавказ
Подъялся наш орел двуглавый;
Когда на Тереке седом
Впервые грянул битвы гром
И грохот русских барабанов,
И в сече, с дерзостным челом,
Явился пылкий Цицианов.

Translation:

And I will sing of that glorious hour,
When, sensing a bloody battle,
Over the indignant Caucasus
Rose our double-headed eagle;
When on the grey Terek
For the first time struck the thunder of battle
And the roar of Russian drums,
And in the battle, with an audacious brow,
The fiery Tsitsianov appeared.

Meanwhile, he was despised and feared by many Caucasian Muslims and Iranians for his brutal actions like the massacre at Ganja and for his scornful attitude. Most Iranians referred to him as Ishpokhdor, an Azeri Turkish distortion of his second title "Inspector" which literally translates as "his work is shit / he whose job is shit." The Iranian chronicler Reza-Qoli Khan Hedayat dubbed him "the shedder of blood." Among the peoples of the Caucasus, he was also known as "the ferocious/fearsome prince."

Many Georgians saw him as a "renegade...unwaveringly attached to Russia's imperial interests and hostile to any recrudescence of Georgian nationalism." Nevertheless, he was considered an improvement over previous Russian governors and managed to at least nominally unite previously fractured Georgian kingdoms and principalities. Overall, "Georgia benefited in the long term from his stern, even at times harsh conduct of affairs".

In Muriel Atkin's view, Tsitsianov was undeserving of the praise he received. She writes that "[w]hat [Tsitsianov's admirers] saw as Tsitsianov's devotion to Russia's interests was really overweening personal ambition; his eloquence was marred by bluster, just as his nobility of character was marred by deceit; the energy he spent was largely other people's; and his determination manifested itself in slaughter." David Marshall Lang writes that Tsitsianov "laid the effective foundations of Russian power in Transcaucasia" and suggests that Georgia benefited from his "stern, even at times harsh conduct of affairs" in the long-term. According to Walter Richmond, Tsitsianov "set in motion the brutality that was the hallmark of subsequent Russian efforts to conquer the North Caucasus." George Bournoutian writes of Tsitsianov that he was "neither the great military commander portrayed by his Russian contemporaries nor was he the terrible ogre painted by the Iranian chroniclers. He was a soldier of his time; that is, he was ambitious, blamed others for his defeats and was a firm believer in European, specifically Russian, superiority over the 'contemptible Asiatics.' [...] Although his aggressive policies had temporarily brought the khanates of Shakki, Qarabagh and Shirvan into the Russian orbit, his military campaigns had resulted in thousands of Russian and Iranian dead and had committed Russia to a ten-year-long war."
