= Simanovich =

Simanovich (Russian: Симанович, Belarusian: Сімановіч) is a gender-neutral Slavic surname. Notable people with the surname include:

- Anastasia Simanovich (born 1995), Russian water polo player
- Dzianis Simanovich (born 1987), Belarusian racewalker
