= Khando =

Khando Хандо
- Selo
- Location within Republic of Dagestan Location within Russia
- Coordinates: 42°43′N 46°14′E
- Country: Russia
- Region: Republic of Dagestan
- District: Botlikhsky District
- Time zone: UTC+3:00

Khando (Russian: Хандо) is a rural locality (a selo) in Chankovsky Selsoviet, Botlikhsky District, Republic of Dagestan, Russia. The population was 33 as of 2010.

== Geography ==
Khando is located 19 km north of Botlikh (the district's administrative centre) by road, on the Chankovskaya River. Ankho is the nearest rural locality.
