= Paul Portnyagin =

Father Paul Portnyagin (Russian: Павел Константинович Портнягин; 1903–1977) was a Greek-Catholic priest, teacher and orientalist.

== Biography ==
Portnyagin was born in Vladivostok, Russia. In 1930, he converted from the Eastern Orthodox Church to the Catholic faith shortly after migrating to China during the Russian Civil War. There he took part in the Trans-Himalayan expedition of Nicholas Roerich and taught Russian to high school students at Saint Nicholas in Harbin. Later, he studied at the Russicum and the Gregorian University in Rome, but because of health problems was transferred to the Theological Seminary in Prešov, where he was ordained a priest of the Byzantine Rite.

In 1937, Portnyagin returned to Harbin and taught Russian, literature and philosophy. He was arrested by Chinese authorities in 1948 and sent to the Soviet Union, where he was imprisoned in forced labor camps for twenty-five years, until his release in 1956. He lived in Samarkand, where he worked as a translator at the Institute of Karakul. Portnyagin was rehabilitated by Soviet authorities in 1960 and died in Samarkand in 1977.

== Sources ==
- Archive Meudon Russian Research Center; Peshkov LS 4-5.
- St. Theresa the Little Thoughts (Harbin, 1939)
- Modern Tibet: The mission of Nicholas Roerich expedition diary PK Portnyagina (1927-1928) (1998)
- Мысли Св. Терезии Малой. Харбин: Католический вестник, 1939. 76 с.
- Современный Тибет: Миссия Николая Рериха: Экспедиционный дневник П. К. Портнягина (1927—1928) // Армеварта, № 2, 1998. с. 11 — 116, ил.
