= Bartenev =

Bartenev/Bartenyov (Бартенев/Бартенёв) or Barteneva/Bartenyova (Бартенева/Бартенёва; feminine) is a Russian surname. The last name is the 147,321st most frequently held surname on earth It is held by around 1 in 2,424,333 people. Notable people with the surname include:

== Bartenev ==
- Aleksandr Nikolaevich Bartenev (Александр Николаевич Бартенев; 1882–1946), Russian zoologist.
- Andrey Bartenev (Андрей Бартенев, b. 1969), Russian artist, sculptor, experimentalist, and creator of many provocative, interactive installations and performances.
- Leonid Bartenyev (Леонид Владимирович Бартенев, b. 1933), Soviet athlete who competed mainly in the 100 metres.
- Pyotr Ivanovich Bartenev (Пётр Иванович Бартенев; 1829–1912), Russian historian and collector of unpublished memoirs.
