= List of natural monuments of Georgia =

This is a List of natural monuments of Georgia. As of January 1, 2020, there are 40 Natural Monuments comprising caves, landforms, waterfalls and remarkable old trees. Total number of protected areas in Georgia — 89. Management and coordination of the Protected Areas is implemented by a Legal Entity of Public Law Protected Areas Agency of the Ministry of Environment Protection and Natural Resources of Georgia.

- Abano Mineral Lake Natural Monument
- Alazani Floodplain Forests Natural Monument
- Artsivi (Eagle) Gorge Natural Monument
- Balda Canyon Natural Monument
- Bgheri Cave Natural Monument
- Birtvisi Natural Monument
- Bodorna Rock Columns Natural Monument
- Didghele Cave Natural Monument
- Gabzaruli Tba Natural Monument
- Ghliana Cave Natural Monument
- Gachedili Canyon Natural Monument
- Goderdzi Petrified Forest Natural Monument
- Iazoni Cave Natural Monument
- Jortsku Cave Natural Monument
- Jvari Pass Travertine Natural Monument
- Keterisi Mineral Vaucluse
- Khomuli Cave Natural Monument
- Melouri Cave Natural Monument
- Motena Cave Natural Monument
- Mukhura Waterfall Natural Monument
- Nagarevi Cave Natural Monument
- Navenakhevi Cave Natural Monument
- Nazodelavo Cave Natural Monument
- Ochkhomuri Waterfall Natural Monument
- Kinchkha Waterfall Natural Monument
- Okatse Canyon Natural Monument
- Oniore Waterfall and Toba First Cave Natural Monuments
- Prometheus Cave Natural Monument
- River Abasha Waterfall Natural Monument
- Sakazhia Cave Natural Monument
- Sakhizari Cliff Natural Monument
- Samshvilde Canyon Natural Monument
- Satsurblia Cave Natural Monument
- Solkota Cave Natural Monument
- Takhti-Tepha Natural Monument
- Tetra Cave Natural Monument
- Toba Waterfall and Arsen Okrojanashvili Cave Natural Monument
- Truso Travertines Natural Monument
- Tsalka Canyon Natural Monument
- Tskaltsitela Gorge Natural Monument
- Tsutskhvati Cave Natural Monument
