= List of protected areas of Georgia (country) =

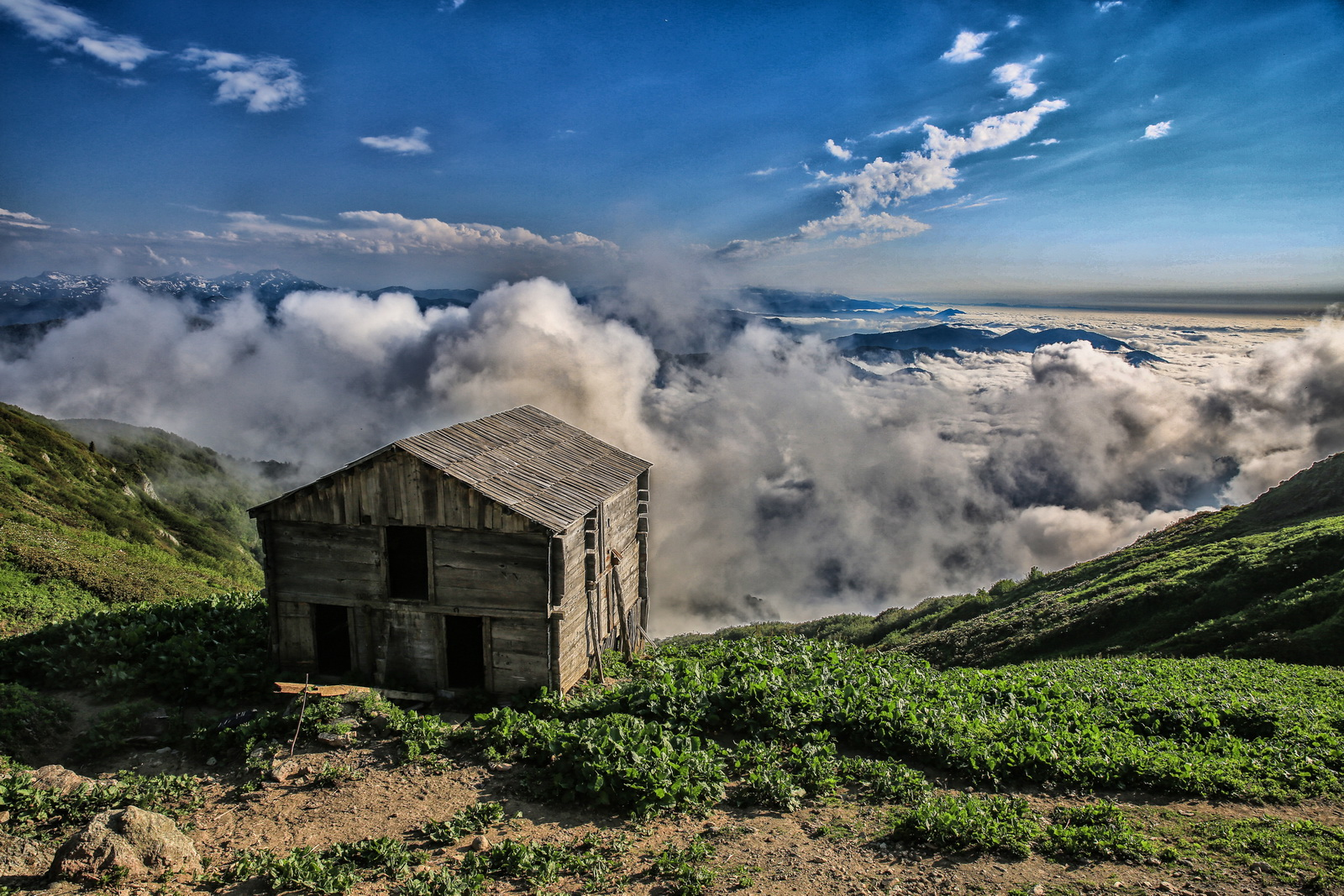
A view at Kintrishi National Park

The South Caucasian nation of Georgia is home to several protected areas, which receive protection because of their environmental, cultural or similar value. The oldest of these – now known as the Lagodekhi Protected Areas – dates back to 1912, when Georgia was part of the Russian Empire.

The total area of Georgia's protected terrestrial territories is 6,501 km^{2} (2,510 sq mi), which amounts to approximately 9.29% of the country's territory. In addition 153 km^{2} (59 sq mi) of marine area protected, or 0.67% of the country's territorial waters. There are a total of 89 protected areas, including 14 Strict Nature Reserves, 12 National Parks, 20 Managed Nature Reserves, 40 Natural Monuments, 2 Ramsar sites and 1 Protected Landscape. Strict nature reserves comprise 140,672 ha, while national parks cover 276,724 ha. The total number of visitors to Georgia's protected areas was just under 1.2 million in 2019.

== Strict Nature Reserves ==
Name	Region	Municipality	Established	Coordinates	Area	IUCN category
Babaneuri Strict Nature Reserve	Kakheti	Akhmeta Municipality	2003	42°05′15″N 45°23′55″E	15.16 km^{2}	Ia
Batsara Strict Nature Reserve	Kakheti	Akhmeta Municipality	2003	42°14′41″N 45°15′06″E	55.48 km^{2}	Ia
Bichvinta-Miuseri Strict Nature Reserve	Abkhazia	Gagra District and Gudauta District	1965	43°10′27″N 40°25′32″E	75.33 km^{2}	Ia
Borjomi Strict Nature Reserve	Samtskhe-Javakheti	Borjomi Municipality	1929	41°49′39.1″N 43°16′01″E	237.5 km^{2}	Ia
Kintrishi Strict Nature Reserve	Adjara	Kobuleti Municipality	1959	41°44′57″N 42°02′04″E	55.86 km^{2}	Ia
Kobuleti Strict Nature Reserve	Adjara	Kobuleti Municipality	1998	41°51′47″N 41°48′09″E	5.7 km^{2}	Ia
Lagodekhi Strict Nature Reserve	Kakheti	Lagodekhi Municipality	1912	41°54′00″N 46°20′00″E	356.98 km^{2}	Ia
Liakhvi Strict Nature Reserve	Shida Kartli	Akhalgori Municipality	1977	42°23′05″N 44°15′04″E	120.22 km^{2}	Ia
Mariamjvari Strict Nature Reserve	Kakheti	Sagarejo Municipality	1935	41°46′07″N 45°22′38″E	18.41 km^{2}	Ia
Pskhu-Gumista Strict Nature Reserve	Abkhazia	Sukhumi District	1941	43°20′44″N 41°00′29″E	733.48 km^{2}	Ia
Ritsa Strict Nature Reserve	Abkhazia	Gudauta District	1930	43°29′24″N 40°37′04″E	311.0 km^{2}	Ia
Sataplia Strict Nature Reserve	Imereti	Tsqaltubo Municipality	1935	42°18′58.2″N 42°40′21.6″E	6.04 km^{2}	Ia
Tusheti Strict Nature Reserve	Kakheti	Akhmeta Municipality	2003	42°22′53.6″N 45°36′46.2″E	231.51 km^{2}	Ia
Vashlovani Strict Nature Reserve	Kakheti	Dedoplistsqaro Municipality	1935	41°09′17.5″N 46°32′49.6″E	176.12 km^{2}	Ia

== National parks ==
- Algeti National Park
- Borjomi-Kharagauli National Park
- Javakheti National Park
- Kazbegi National Park
- Kintrishi National Park
- Kolkheti National Park
- Machakhela National Park
- Mtirala National Park
- Tbilisi National Park
- Tusheti National Park
- Vashlovani National Park
- Pshav-Khevsureti National Park

== Managed Reserves ==
- Ajameti Managed Reserve
- Asa Managed Reserve
- Bugdasheni Managed Reserve
- Chachuna Managed Reserve
- Gardabani Managed Reserve
- Ilto Managed Reserve
- Iori Managed Reserve
- Kartsakhi Managed Reserve
- Katsoburi Managed Reserve
- Khanchali Managed Reserve
- Kobuleti Managed Reserve
- Korugi Managed Reserve
- Ktsia-Tabatskuri Managed Reserve
- Lagodekhi Managed Reserve
- Madatapa Managed Reserve
- Nedzvi Managed Reserve
- Sataplia Managed Reserve
- Sulda Managed Reserve
- Tetrobi Managed Reserve

== Natural Monuments ==
- Abano Mineral Lake Natural Monument
- Alazani Floodplain Forests Natural Monument
- Artsivi (Eagle) Gorge Natural Monument
- Balda Canyon Natural Monument
- Bgheri Cave Natural Monument
- Birtvisi Natural Monument
- Bodorna Rock Columns Natural Monument
- Didghele Cave Natural Monument
- Gabzaruli Tba Natural Monument
- Ghliana Cave Natural Monument
- Gachedili Canyon Natural Monument
- Goderdzi Petrified Forest Natural Monument
- Iazoni Cave Natural Monument
- Jortsku Cave Natural Monument
- Jvari Pass Travertine Natural Monument
- Keterisi Mineral Vaucluse
- Khomuli Cave Natural Monument
- Melouri Cave Natural Monument
- Motena Cave Natural Monument
- Mukhura Waterfall Natural Monument
- Nagarevi Cave Natural Monument
- Navenakhevi Cave Natural Monument
- Nazodelavo Cave Natural Monument
- Ochkhomuri Waterfall Natural Monument
- Kinchkha Waterfall Natural Monument
- Okatse Canyon Natural Monument
- Oniore Waterfall and Toba First Cave Natural Monuments
- Prometheus Cave Natural Monument
- River Abasha Waterfall Natural Monument
- Sakazhia Cave Natural Monument
- Sakhizari Cliff Natural Monument
- Samshvilde Canyon Natural Monument
- Satsurblia Cave Natural Monument
- Solkota Cave Natural Monument
- Takhti-Tepha Natural Monument
- Tetra Cave Natural Monument
- Toba Waterfall and Arsen Okrojanashvili Cave Natural Monument
- Truso Travertines Natural Monument
- Tsalka Canyon Natural Monument
- Tskaltsitela Gorge Natural Monument
- Tsutskhvati Cave Natural Monument

== Ramsar sites ==
- Wetlands of Central Kolkheti
- Ispani Mire

== Protected Landscapes ==
- Tusheti Protected Landscape

== Planned protected areas ==
- Central Caucasus Protected Areas
- Khvamli Planned Managed Reserve
- Trialeti Planned National Park

== See also ==
- Environmental issues in Georgia
