= National parks of Georgia =

Georgia has a long history of establishing protected areas dating back to 1912 when the Lagodekhi Strict Nature Reserve was created. Nowadays, protected areas make up to 7% of the country's territory (384 684 ha) and about 75% of protected areas are covered by forests. Total number of protected areas in Georgia — 89. In Georgia there are 14 Strict Nature Reserves, 12 National Parks, 20 Managed Nature Reserves, 40 Natural Monuments, 2 Ramsar sites and 1 Protected Landscape. Management and coordination of the Protected Areas is implemented by a Legal Entity of Public Law Protected Areas Agency of the Ministry of Environment Protection and Natural Resources of Georgia. Currently under development:

- Trialeti Planned National Park

== National parks ==
Name	Region	Municipality	Established	Coordinates	Area	IUCN category
Algeti National Park	Kvemo Kartli	Tetritsqaro Municipality	2007	41°43′N 44°19′E	157.63 square kilometres (60.86 mi^{2})	II
Borjomi-Kharagauli National Park	Samtskhe-Javakheti	Borjomi, Kharagauli, Akhaltsikhe, Adigeni, Khashuri and Baghdati Municipality	1995	41°51′N 43°10′E	1,093.0 square kilometres (422.0 mi^{2})	II
Javakheti National Park	Samtskhe–Javakheti	Ninotsminda Municipality	2011	41°10′N 43°26′E	238.53 square kilometres (92.10 mi^{2})	II
Kazbegi National Park	Mtskheta-Mtianeti	Kazbegi Municipality	1976	42°30′12.61″N 44°27′14.55″E	1,446.17 square kilometres (558.37 mi^{2})	II
Kintrishi National Park	Adjara	Kobuleti Municipality	2007	41.682°N 42.039°E	186.84 square kilometres (72.14 mi^{2})	II
Kolkheti National Park	Colchis	Samegrelo-Zemo Svaneti and Guria	1998	42°6′39″N 41°41′46″E	807.99 square kilometres (311.97 mi^{2})	II
Machakhela National Park	Adjara	Khelvachauri Municipality	2012	41°31′12.92″N 41°43′10.81″E	130.7 square kilometres (50.5 mi^{2})	II
Mtirala National Park	Adjara	Kobuleti, Khelvachauri and Keda Municipality	2006	41°41′51.1″N 41°53′22.2″E	281.26 square kilometres (108.60 mi^{2})	II
Tbilisi National Park	Mtskheta-Mtianeti	Mtskheta Municipality	2007	41°52′N 44°56′E	380.02 square kilometres (146.73 mi^{2})	II
Tusheti National Park	Kakheti	Akhmeta Municipality	2003	42°24′36″N 45°29′13″E	1,276.43 square kilometres (492.83 mi^{2})	II
Vashlovani National Park	Kakheti	Dedoplistsqaro Municipality	2007	41°12′N 46°23′E	442.51 square kilometres (170.85 mi^{2})	II
Pshav-Khevsureti National Park	Mtskheta-Mtianeti	Dusheti Municipality	2014	42.66°N 45.16°E	1,400.44 square kilometres (540.71 mi^{2})	II

== See also ==
- Environmental issues in Georgia
- List of protected areas of Georgia
