= Nagarevi Cave Natural Monument =

Karst cave in the Imereti region of Georgia

- Nagarevi Grotto
- IUCN category III (natural monument or feature)
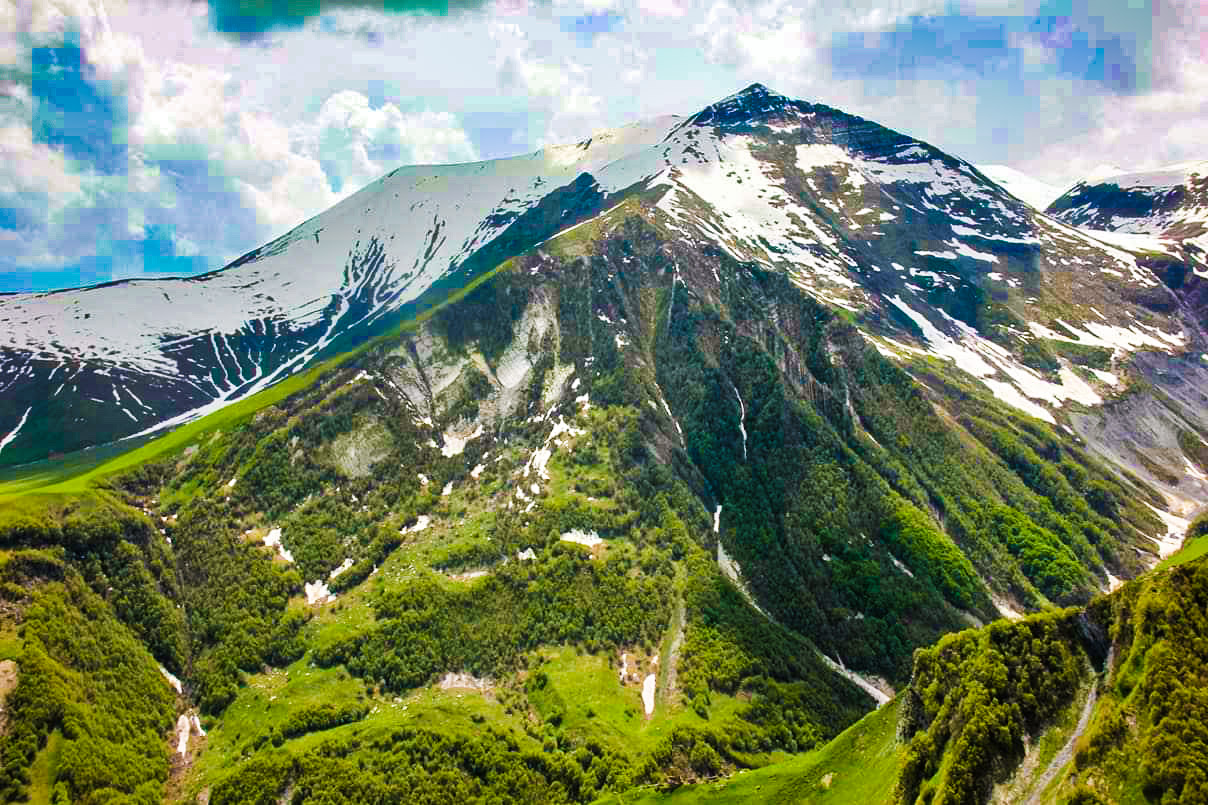
- View outside Nagarevi Cave

- Location within Georgia Location within Imereti
- Interactive map of Nagarevi Cave Natural Monument
- Nearest city: Terjola
- Coordinates: 42°14′9.27″N 42°48′25.3″E
- Established: 2013
- Governing body: Agency of Protected Areas

Nagarevi Cave Natural Monument (Georgian: ნაგარევის მღვიმის ბუნების ძეგლი) is a karst cave located near village Godogani, Terjola Municipality in Imereti region of Georgia, 199 meters above sea level. It is located on the left slope of the scenic Cheshura Gorge across the river from monastery.

== Morphology ==
Nagarevi Cave formed in Cretaceous limestones in Okriba karst massif. Cave total length is 140 m. From entrance main pathway descends spirally downstream and forms a narrow tunnel. The front part of the cave has two storeys layout. Further down cave has several narrow branches and small halls. There are fragments of terraces. Cave speleothems are poorly developed. Small stream at the junction of the cave branches is always present. During the rains it is completely filled with water.

== Fauna ==
The inhabitants of the cave include Oxychilus, Minunthozetes, Oribatula and Oribella.

== See also ==
- Navenakhevi Cave Natural Monument
- Tsutskhvati Cave Natural Monument
- Sakazhia Cave Natural Monument
