= Ktsia-Tabatskuri Managed Reserve =

Protected nature area in Georgia

- Georgian: ქცია-ტაბაწყურის აღკვეთილი
- IUCN category IV (habitat/species management area)
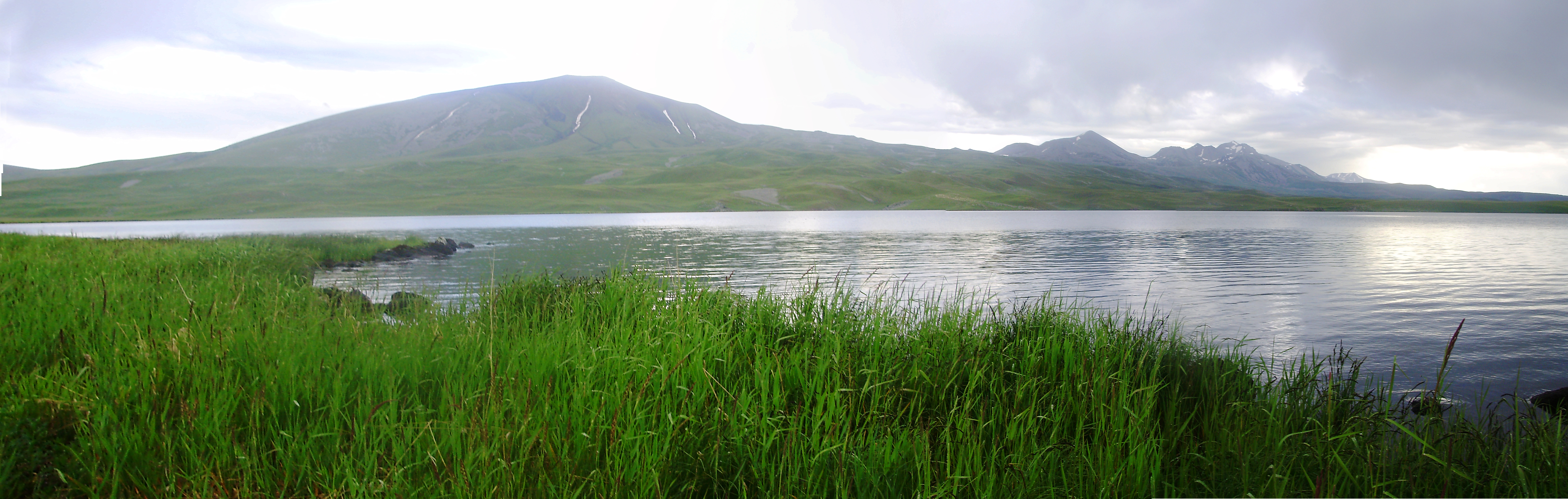
- Tabatskuri lake, with Samsari Range visible in the background.

- Location within Georgia Location within Samtskhe-Javakheti
- Interactive map of Ktsia-Tabatskuri Managed Reserve
- Location: Georgia
- Coordinates: 41°41′06.6″N 43°34′13.5″E
- Area: 220 km^{2} (85 sq mi)
- Established: 1995
- Governing body: Agency of Protected Areas
- Website: Managed Reserve Info

Ktsia-Tabatskuri Managed Reserve (Georgian: ქცია-ტაბაწყურის აღკვეთილი) is a protected area in Akhalkalaki Municipality in Samtskhe-Javakheti region of Georgia. It protects Tabatskuri Lake, wetland and alpine habitats.

The Tskhratskaro pass is located within the Ktsia-Tabatskuri Managed Reserve.

== Environmental Concerns ==
The Baku–Tbilisi–Ceyhan pipeline is partly situated within the borders of Ktsia-Tabatskuri Managed Reserve.

== See also ==
- Tetrobi Managed Reserve
