= Motena Cave Natural Monument =

Cave in Georgia

- IUCN category III (natural monument or feature)
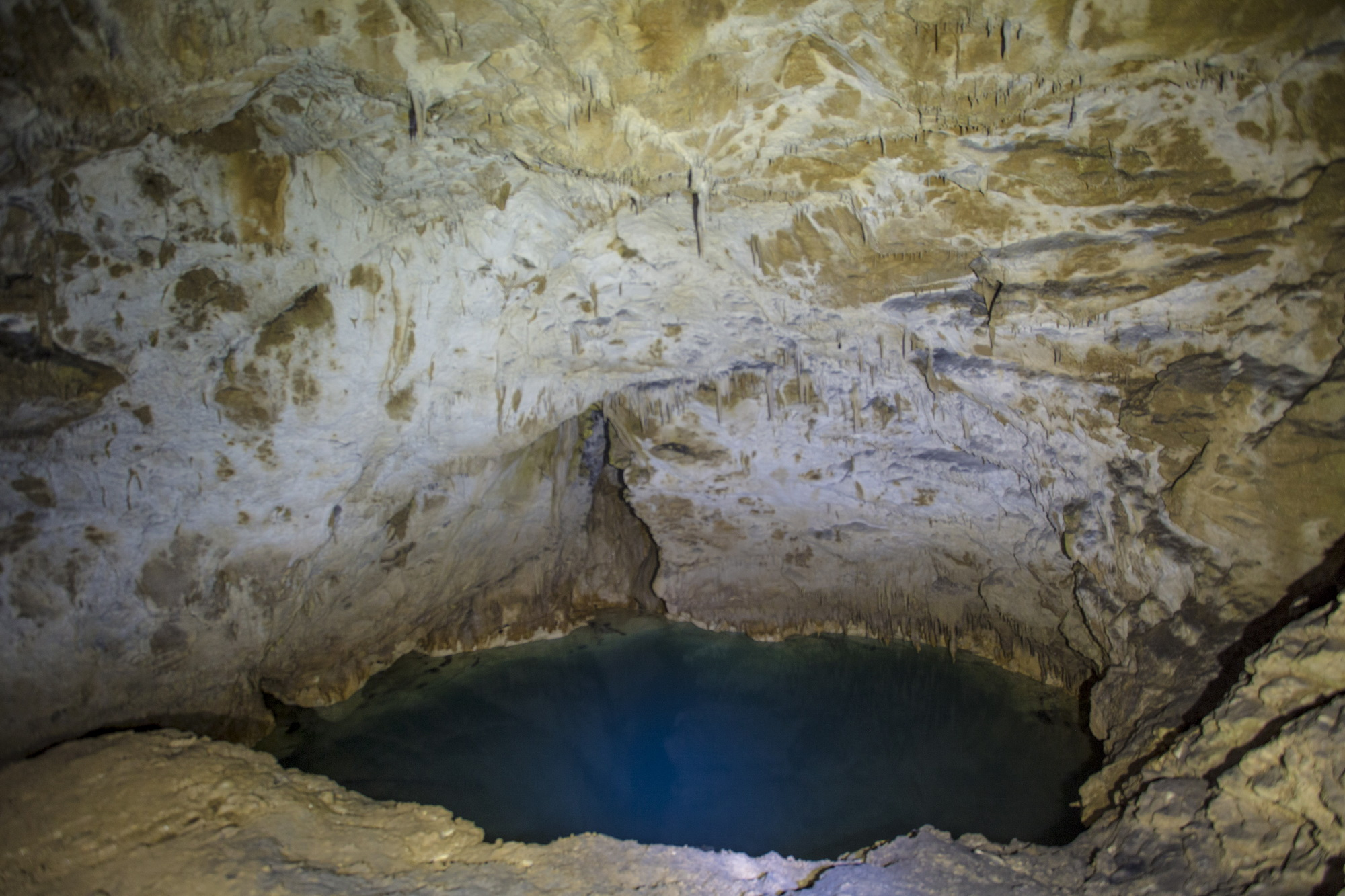
- Inside Motena Cave

- Location within Georgia Location within Samegrelo-Zemo Svaneti
- Nearest city: Martvili
- Coordinates: 42°28′35.7″N 42°23′28.2″E
- Established: 2007
- Governing body: Agency of Protected Areas
- Website: მოთენას მღვიმის ბუნების ძეგლი

Motena Cave Natural Monument (Georgian: მოთენას მღვიმე) is a karst cave located 0.7 km to the south from village First Balda (Pirveli Baldi ) in Martvili Municipality in Samegrelo-Zemo Svaneti region of Georgia, 437 meters above sea level. Cave is located on left bank of Abasha river. In Middle Ages Motena cave was integral part of the now lost fortress.

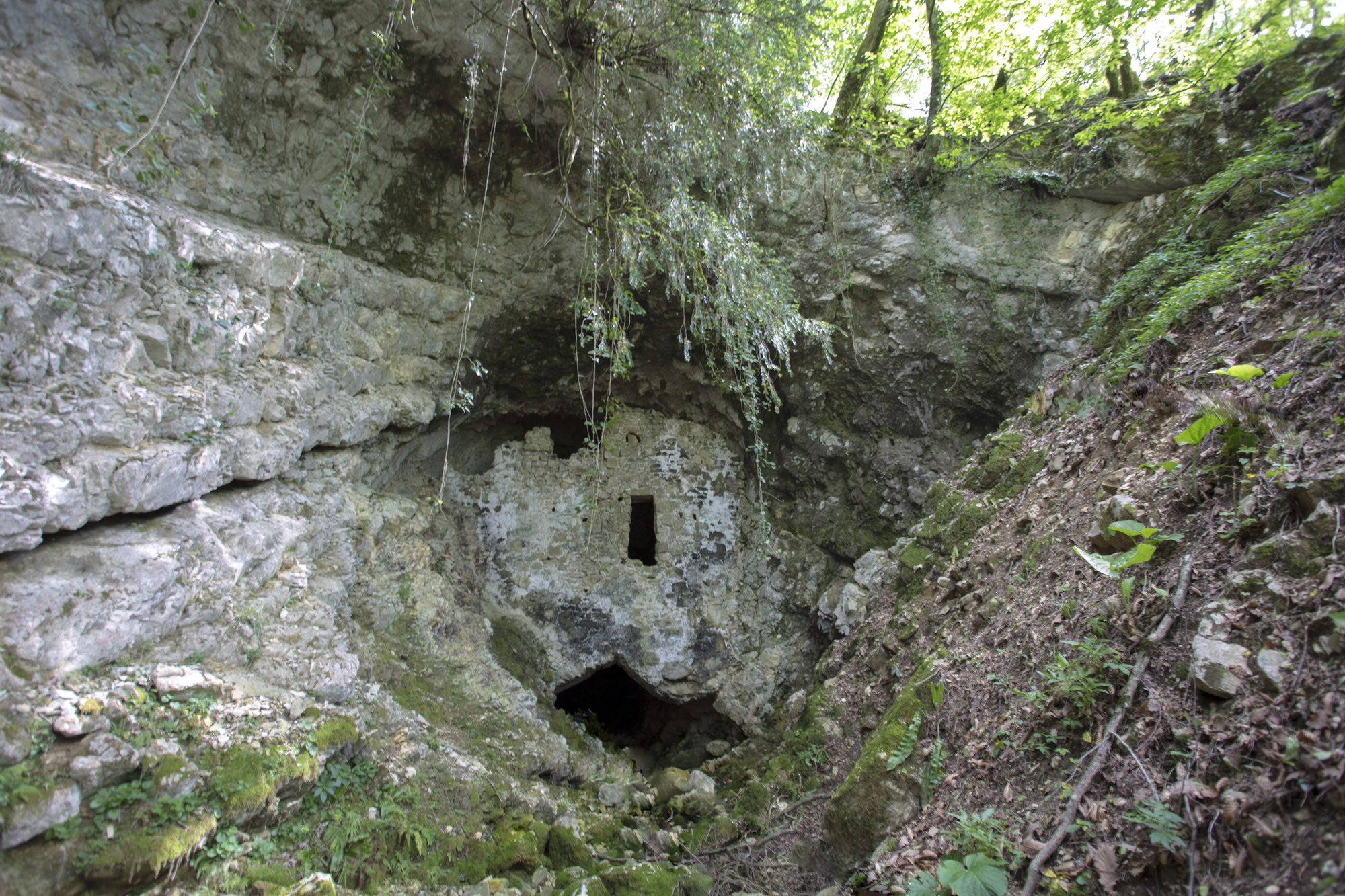
Wall protecting Motena Cave

== Morphology ==
Motena Cave is a karst cave, formed in Askhi karst massif. The total length of the cave is 75 m. It has two storey with big hall on each connected by a narrow passage. The first hall is 30 m in length and 24–25 m in height. Cave is naturally decorated with many stalactites, stalagmites, travertine cascades and cave curtains. Part of the cave has collapsed and mortared stone wall is protecting cave interior.

== Fauna ==
The inhabitants of the cave are spiders and insects, namely Trachysphaera, Heteromurus, Lepidocyrtus, Tomocerus, Sphaerozetes, Chamobates, Porobelba, Adaugammarus, Parasitus, Pergamasus, Xiphocaridinella, Troglocaridicola, Scutariella, and Tectocepheus.

== See also ==
- Jortsku Cave Natural Monument
- Balda Canyon Natural Monument
