= Asa Managed Reserve =

Protected nature area in Georgia

- Georgian: ასას ხეობა
- IUCN category IV (habitat/species management area)
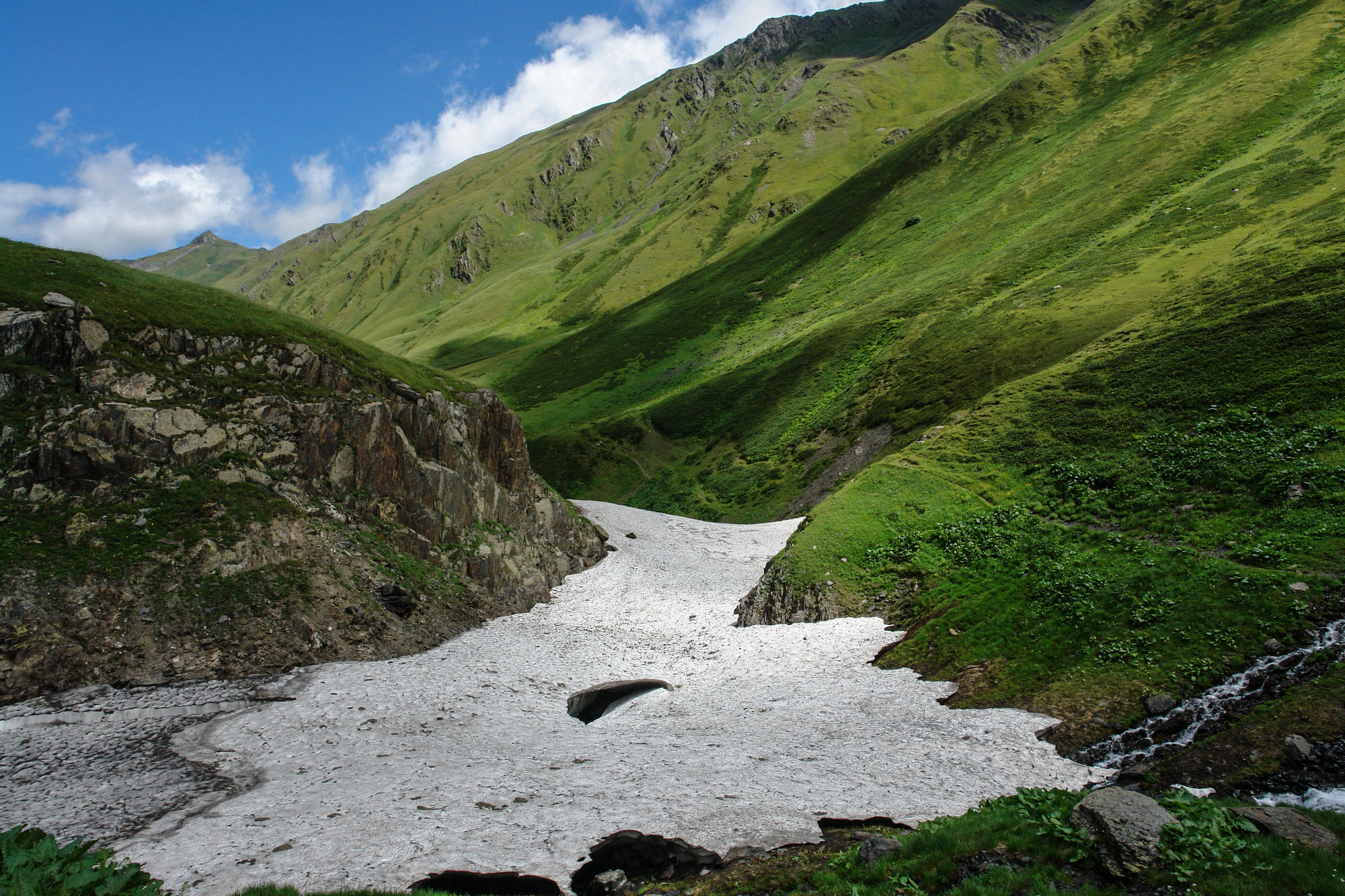
- Asa Managed Reserve

- Location within Georgia Location within Mtskheta-Mtianeti
- Location: Georgia
- Coordinates: 42°43′07″N 44°52′43″E
- Area: 39.43 km^{2} (15.22 sq mi)
- Established: 2014
- Governing body: Agency of Protected Areas
- Website: Managed Reserve Info

Asa Managed Reserve (Georgian: ასას ხეობა) is a protected area in the Dusheti Municipality, Mtskheta-Mtianeti region of Georgia in historical Khevsureti. It protects flora and fauna in highlands with several glaciers.

== Geography ==
Protected highlands are in the valley of Assa river and it tributary Chkhotuni river. There are several small glaciers in this area.

== See also ==
- Khevsureti
- Assa River (Sunzha River)
- Tusheti Strict Nature Reserve
- Pshav-Khevsureti National Park
- Erzi Nature Reserve
