= Navenakhevi Cave Natural Monument =

Cave in Georgia

- IUCN category III (natural monument or feature)
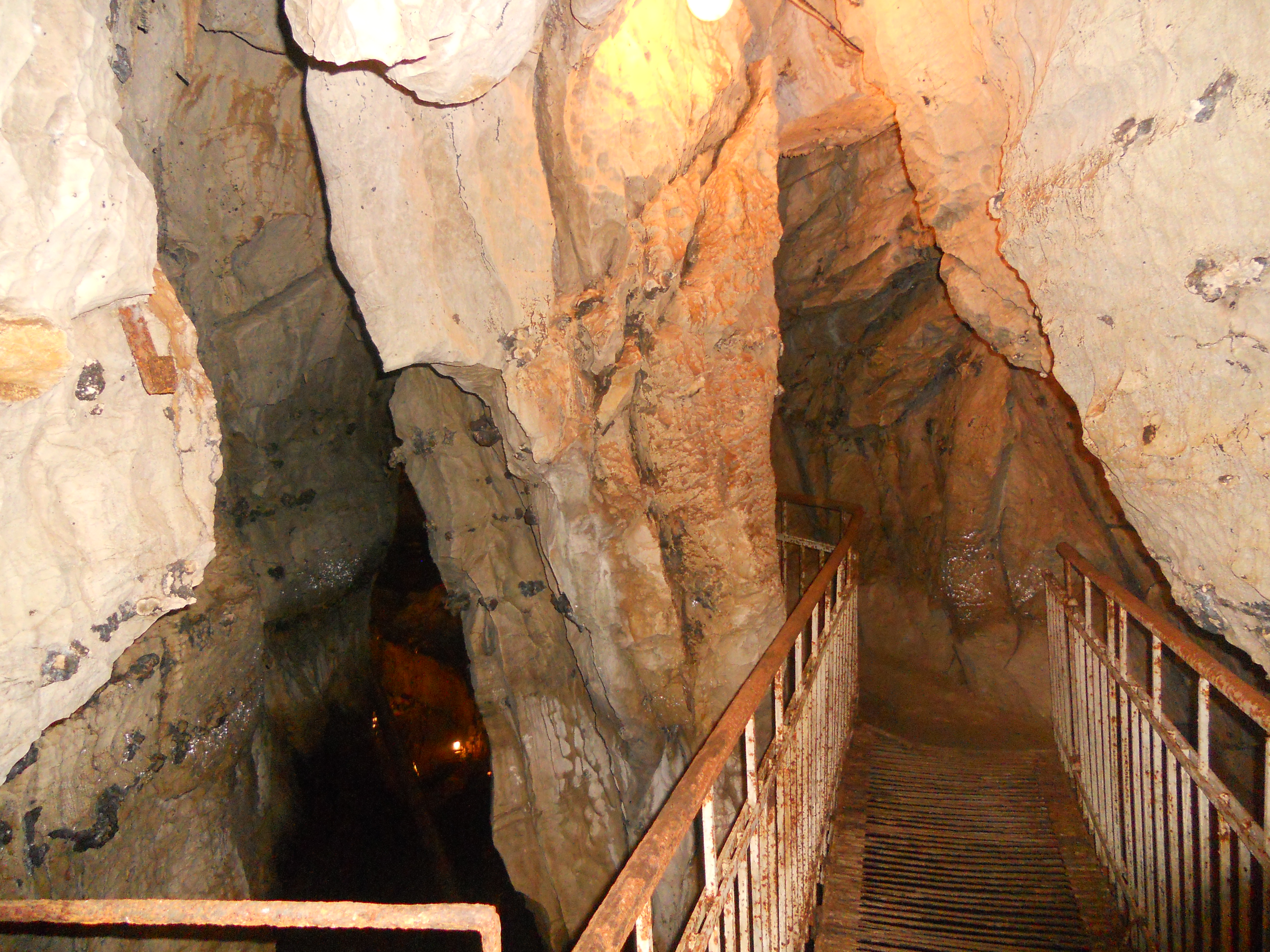

- Location within Georgia Location within Imereti
- Nearest city: Kutaisi
- Coordinates: 42°14′56″N 42°51′35″E
- Area: 0.02 km^{2} (0.0077 sq mi)
- Established: 2007
- Governing body: Agency of Protected Areas
- Website: Navenakhevi Cave

Navenakhevi Cave Natural Monument (Georgian: ნავენახევის მღვიმე) is a karst cave near village Navenakhevi in Terjola Municipality in Imereti region of Western Georgia, 235 m above sea level. In 2017 cave was refurbished to be used as a tourist attraction.

== Morphology ==
Cave carved in Okriba karst massif Cretaceous limestone has two floors and four big halls with total height of 250 m. The entrance with height - 0.6 m and width 2 m opens at the bottom of the hardened cavern. Cave is divided into two parts in 30 meters from the entrance. The second floor is connected to the main hall with small steps. A large hall on the second floor is 15 m high. Cave is naturally decorated with stalagmites and stalactites of various shapes. Abundant material of rubble, clay slabs are present throughout the cave and it branch-bony formations are well preserved. At exit cave is stuck with a stalactite with thickness of 7 meters.

== Fauna ==
The inhabitants of the cave include Metaphorura, Coecobrya, Lepidocyrtus, Folsomia, Achipteria, Conchogneta, Sphaerozetes, Chamobates, Belba, Minunthozetes, Phauloppia, Pantelozetes, Eupelops, Pseudotyphlopasilia and Tectocepheus.

== See also ==
- Prometheus Cave Natural Monument
