= Iazoni Cave Natural Monument =

Cave in Georgia

- Jazon Cave, Tskaltsitela Cave
- IUCN category III (natural monument or feature)
- Location within Georgia Location within Imereti
- Nearest city: Kutaisi
- Coordinates: 42°16′19.62″N 42°44′1.63″E
- Established: 2007
- Governing body: Agency of Protected Areas
- Website: Iazoni Cave Natural Monument

Iazoni Cave Natural Monument (Georgian: იაზონის მღვიმე) also known as Tskaltsitela Cave is a karst cave located across the river Tskaltsitela near village Godogni, Terjola Municipality, just outside Kutaisi in Imereti region of Georgia, 135 metres above sea level. Cave is on the right bank of Tskaltsitela river, the tributary of the Rioni, near Godogni village bridge.

== Morphology ==
Iazoni cave is carved in the Lower Cretaceous limestone, which is a riverbed material. Cave total length is 40 meters. Cave is notable for it arch-shaped ceilings naturally decorated with small stalactites accompanied by stalagmites on the floor. Width of the cave is quickly reduced to 2.5 m at a distance of just 10 m from the entrance and the ceiling height decreases to 0.5 m closer to the cave end section. Silty muck makes cave floor slippery and access to cave difficult.

== Fauna and paleontological findings ==
The cave provides shelter to various animals. It is home to troglofauna such as Troglocaris (Xiphocaridinella) kutaissiana (Sadowsky, 1930). Paleontological findings of animal bones and flint tools established presence of cave dwellers of the Paleolithic Age.

== See also ==
- Tskaltsitela Gorge Natural Monument
