= Katsoburi Managed Reserve =

Protected nature area in Georgia

- Georgian: კაცობურის აღკვეთილი
- IUCN category IV (habitat/species management area)
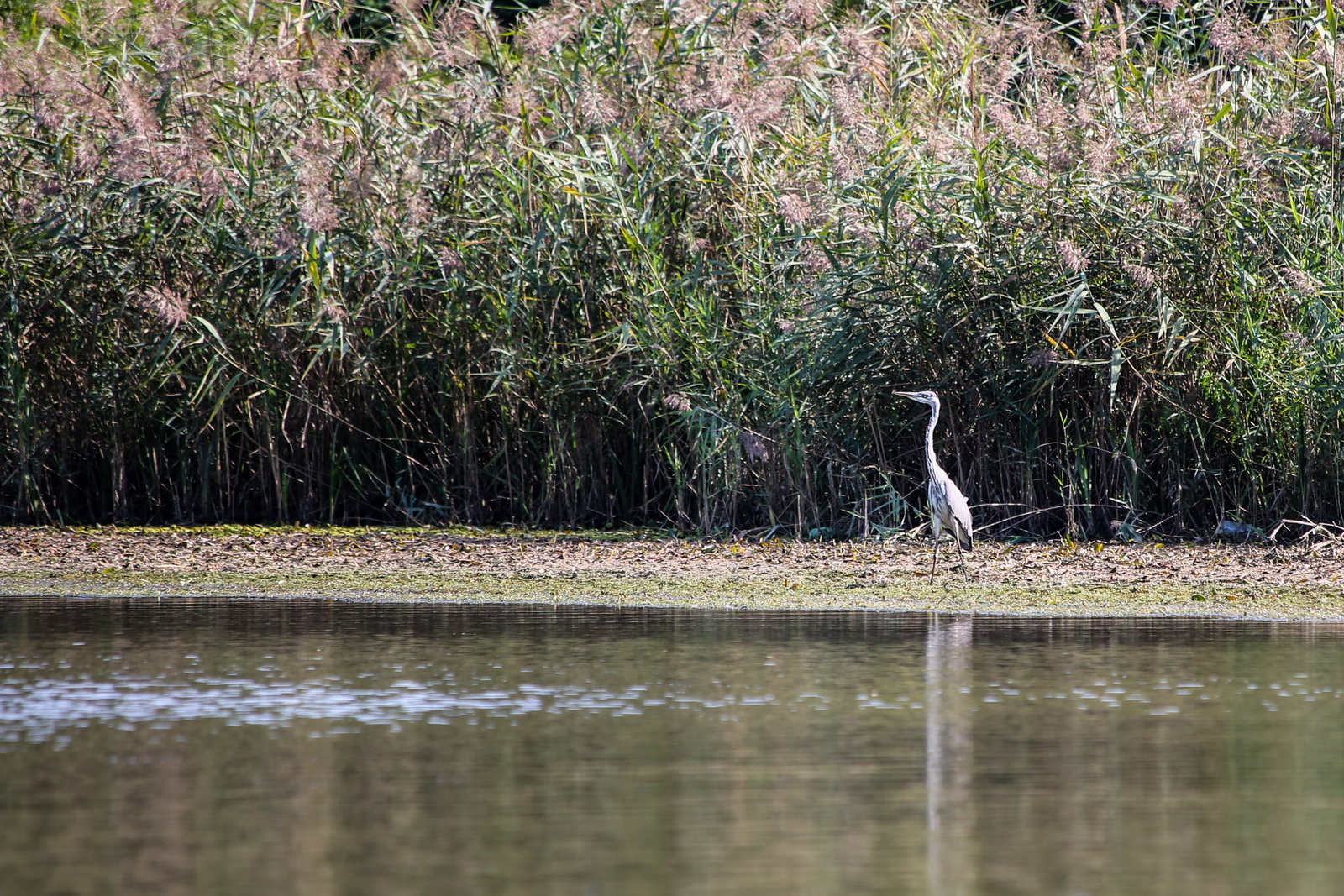
- Bird in nearby Kolkheti National Park.

- Location within Georgia Location within Samegrelo-Zemo Svaneti
- Location: Georgia
- Coordinates: 42°10′13″N 42°03′47″E
- Area: 728 acres (295 ha)
- Established: 1996
- Governing body: Agency of Protected Areas
- Website: Managed Reserve Info

Katsoburi Managed Reserve (Georgian: კაცობურის აღკვეთილი) is a protected area in Abasha Municipality of Samegrelo-Zemo Svaneti in the historical region of Colchis lowlands in western Georgia.

Katsoburi Managed Reserve is part of Georgia's Protected Areas which also includes located nearby Kolkheti National Park.

Korugi Managed Reserve is located on right bank of Rioni river where it takes water from tributary — Megruli Skurda River. Katsoburi Managed Reserve was established in order to protect floodplain forest.

== Geography ==
Reserve covers territory of flat floodplain with maximum height 40 m above sea level. River Rioni flows into the territory of Katsoburi Managed Reserve. Soil types are limited primarily to alluvial claysands and some humus claysand soils in small areas. Hydrography of Katsoburi Managed Reserve is rather complex. It includes Rioni river with tributary — Megruli Skurda River and Narionali Lake. Groundwater comes very close to the earth surface and create marshes.

== Climate ==
Mean annual minimum temperature of January is -4 °C, and annual maximum temperature is +22 °C. Annual total precipitation - 17757 mm.

== Flora ==
Relict Euxine-Colchic deciduous forests did not survive in this area. Forest mainly consists of alder groves, with wing nut (Pterocarya pterocarpa), ash tree (Fraxinus excelsior) and also Mimosa (Acacia dealbata), alder tree (Alnus barbata), Goat willow (Salix caprea), pear (Pyrus caucasica), wild plum (Prunus divaricata), oleaster (Elaeagnus angustifolia) and Indigo bush (Amorpha fruticosa).

== Fauna ==
Mammals include the wild boar and roe deer, wolf, jackal, European badger, European wildcat, Eurasian otter and the European hare.

Several species of birds can be found in the reserve, including: woodpigeon, grey heron, common chaffinch, mallard, ferruginous duck, Eurasian sparrowhawk, northern goshawk as well as a population of common pheasant.

== See also ==
- Rioni River
- Kolkheti National Park
