= Oribellidae =

Scientific classification
- Kingdom: Animalia
- Phylum: Arthropoda
- Subphylum: Chelicerata
- Class: Arachnida
- Order: Sarcoptiformes
- Family: Oribellidae

Family of mites

Oribellidae is a family of mites belonging to the order Sarcoptiformes.

Genera:

- Infernobates Karppinen & Poltavskaja, 1990
- Kaszabobates Balogh, 1972
- Montizetes Kunst, 1971
- Oribella Berlese, 1908
- Oribellopsis Kunst, 1971
- Pantelozetes Grandjean, 1953
- Proteremaeus Piffl, 1965
