= Alazani Floodplain Forests Natural Monument =

Floodplain forest in Georgia

- IUCN category III (natural monument or feature)
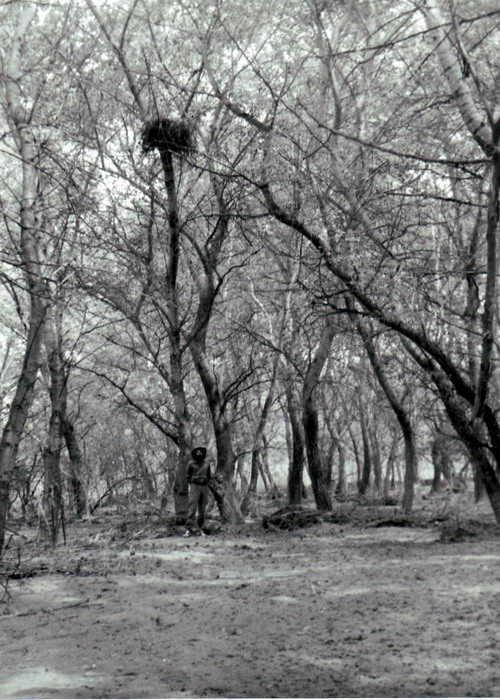
- Tugai-type forest in flood-land of Alazani River, SE Georgia. Eastern imperial eagle's (Aquila heliaca) nest.

- Location within Georgia Location within Kakheti
- Nearest city: Dedoplistsqaro
- Coordinates: 41°41′57″N 46°3′52″E
- Area: 2.04 km^{2} (0.79 sq mi)
- Website: Alazani Floodplain Forests Natural Monument

Alazani Floodplain Forests Natural Monument (Georgian: ალაზნის ჭალა) is a floodplain forest located in Dedoplistsqaro Municipality on the banks of the Alazani River in southeastern Georgia.

== Location and access ==
The Alazani floodplain forests are located on the right bank of the Alazani River to the southwest of the village Pirosmani, at 165 meters (541 ft) above sea level. The protected area covers 204.4 ha (505 acres) of natural floodplain forest. Due to density of the forest it takes one hour to cover a distance of 1 km (0.62 mi) on a pedestrian route in Kakliskure or Walnut Bay.

== Flora ==
The forest is covered by lianas and also has in abundance perennial walnut, ash, oak and elm, as well as bushes characteristic to floodplain forests. It is the only natural habitat of walnut (Juglans regia) in Georgia.

== See also ==
- List of natural monuments of Georgia
