= Mukhura Waterfall Natural Monument =

Waterfall in Georgia

- IUCN category III (natural monument or feature)
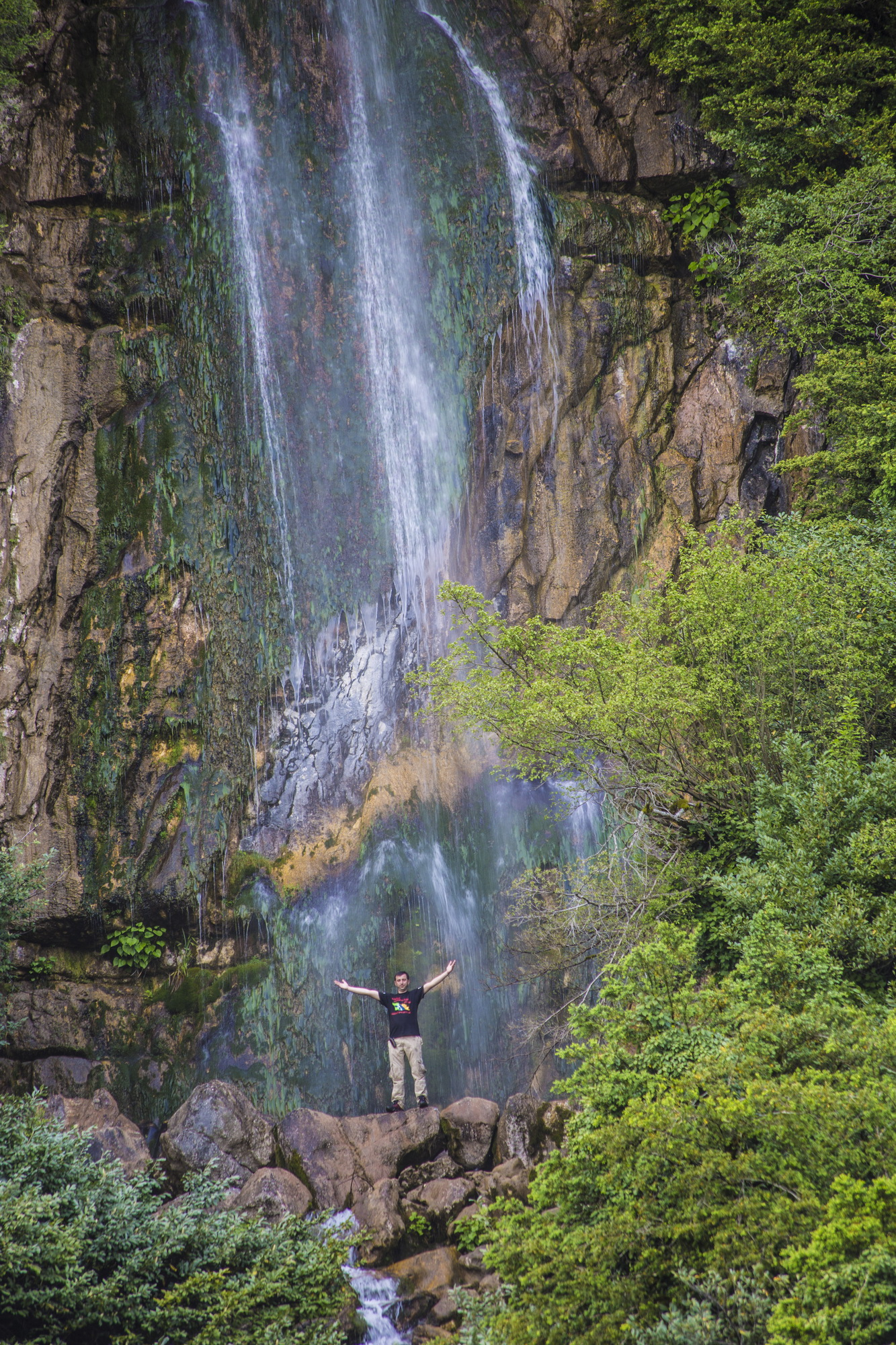
- Mukhura Waterfall Natural Monument

- Location within Georgia Location within Imereti
- Interactive map of Mukhura Waterfall Natural Monument
- Nearest city: village Mukhura of Tkibuli Municipality
- Coordinates: 42°19.568′N 43°02.946′E
- Area: 0.25 km^{2} (0.097 sq mi)
- Website: Mukhura Waterfall

Mukhura Waterfall Natural Monument (Georgian: მუხურას ჩანჩქერის ბუნების ძეგლი) is a waterfall with a height of 60-70 m at 882 m above sea level in Tkibuli Municipality, Imereti region of Georgia. Water flows from the cave located on the slope of eastern exposure and forms a three step waterfall. Inside the cave there is one small and one big lake. There also flows of a pristine river inside the cave, which locals refer to as Tskalmechkheri (shallow water). The banks of the waterfall are covered in mixed broadleaf forest. The place is home to many endemic species, such as Caucasian mole, Volnukhin and Caucasian water shrew. Ten different kinds of bats live in the cave.

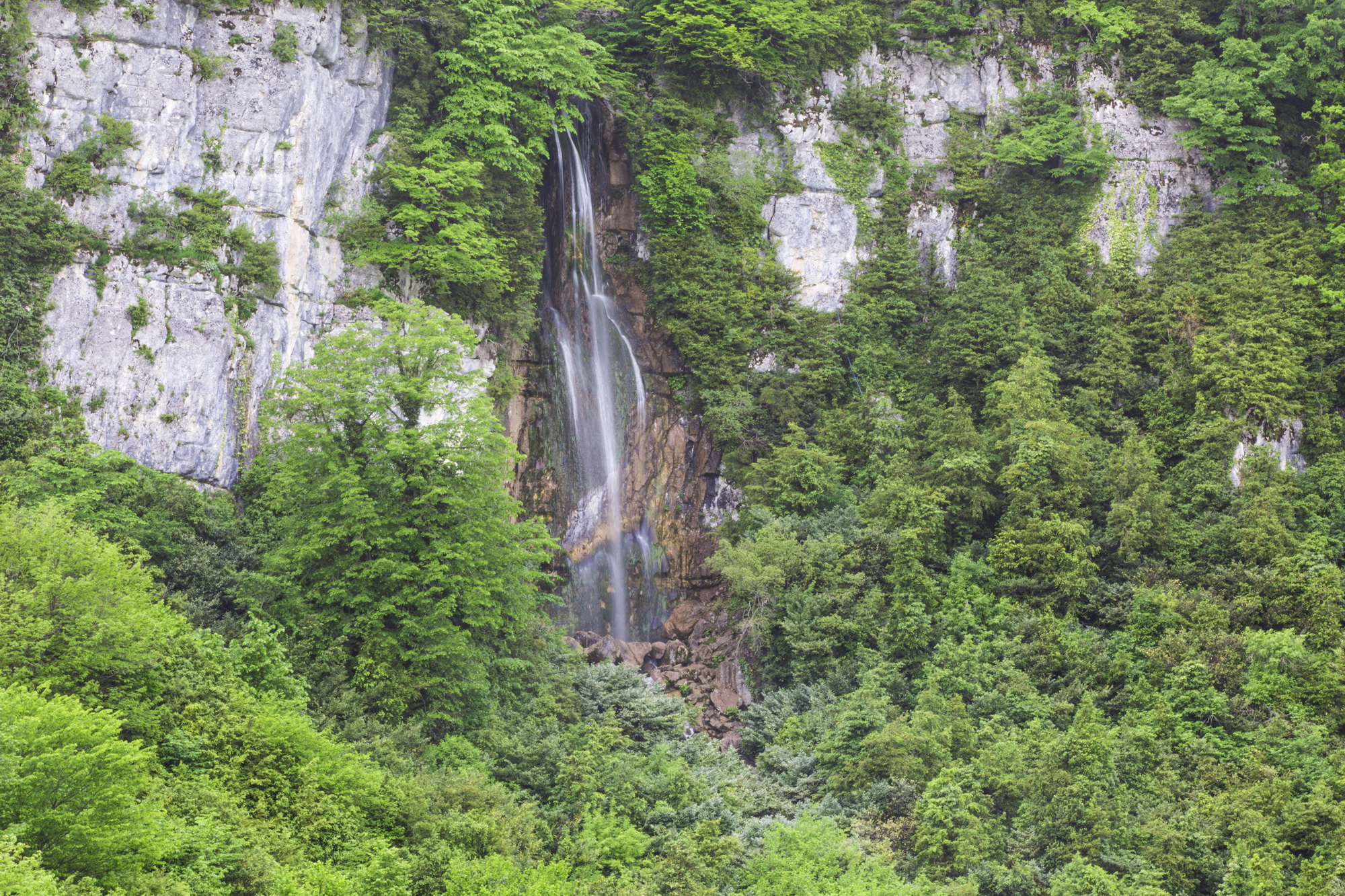
Mukhura waterfall.

== See also ==
- List of natural monuments of Georgia
