= Oribella =

Scientific classification
- Kingdom: Animalia
- Phylum: Arthropoda
- Subphylum: Chelicerata
- Class: Arachnida
- Order: Sarcoptiformes
- Family: Oribellidae
- Genus: Oribella; Berlese, 1908

Genus of mites

Oribella is a genus of mites belonging to the family Oribellidae.

The species of this genus are found in Europe.

Species:

- Oribella adelaidae Golosova & Karppinen, 1985
- Oribella borealis Willmann, 1943
- Oribella canariensis Pérez-Íñigo, 1986
- Oribella castanea (Hermann, 1804)
- Oribella cornuta Berlese, 1910
- Oribella dentata Mihelcic, 1962
- Oribella fujikavae Mahunka, 1982
- Oribella fujikawae Mahunka, 1982
- Oribella magna Mihelcic, 1957
- Oribella matritensis Arillo, Bordel & Subías, 1988
- Oribella pectinata (Michael, 1885)
