= Tetrobi Managed Reserve =

Protected nature area in Georgia

- Georgian: თეთრობის აღკვეთილი
- IUCN category IV (habitat/species management area)
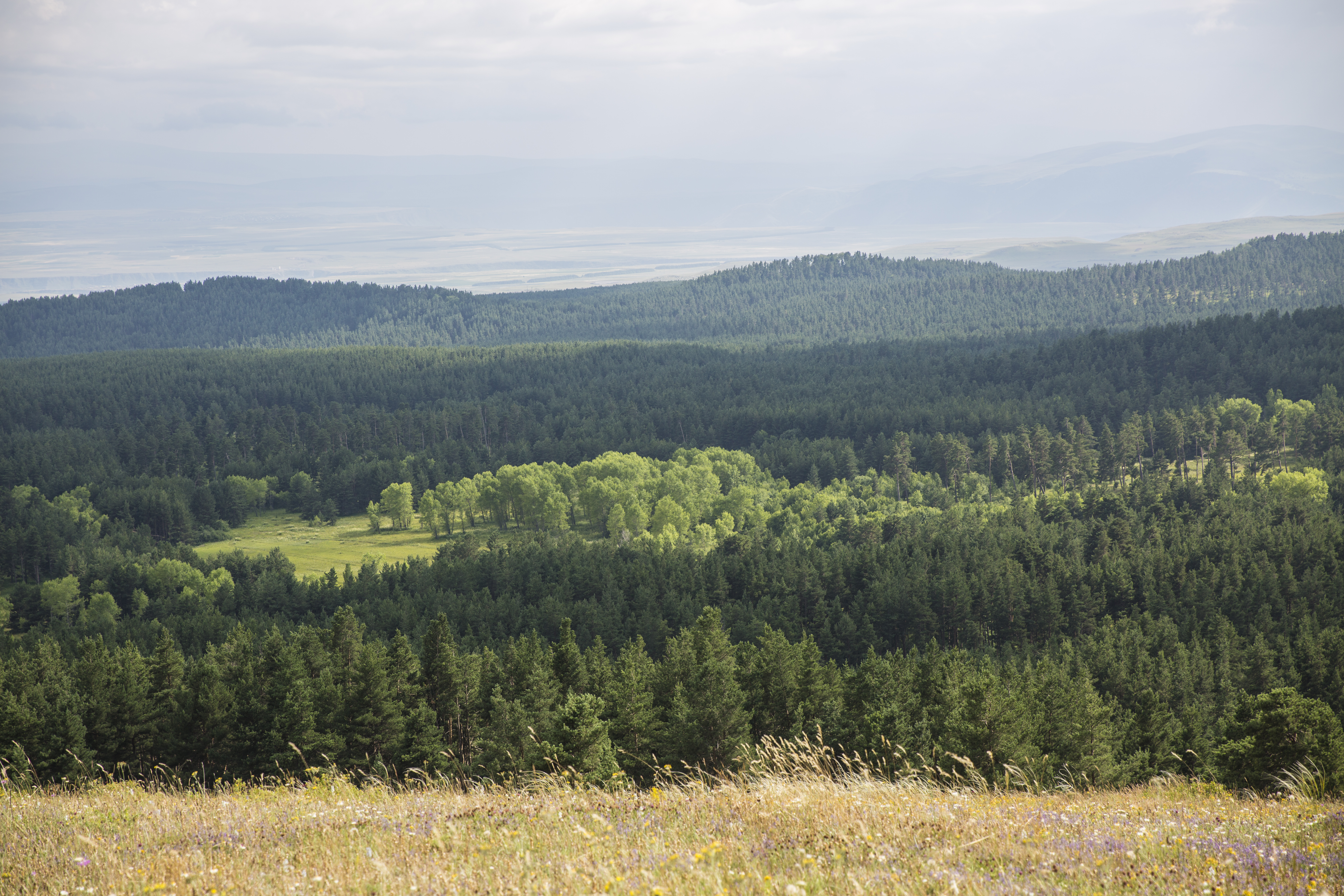
- Land of Tetrobi Managed Reserve

- Location within Georgia Location within Samtskhe-Javakheti
- Location: Georgia
- Coordinates: 41°36′25″N 43°24′20″E
- Area: 31 km^{2} (12 sq mi)
- Established: 1995
- Governing body: Agency of Protected Areas
- Website: Managed Reserve Infoi

Tetrobi Managed Reserve (Georgian: თეთრობის აღკვეთილი) is a protected area in Akhalkalaki Municipality on Javakheti plateau in Samtskhe-Javakheti region of Georgia. It protects land in valley of Chobareti river on the Chobareti mountain range at volcanic plateau of Tetrobi.

Its pine forest (Pinus kochiana) and native plants are under protection.

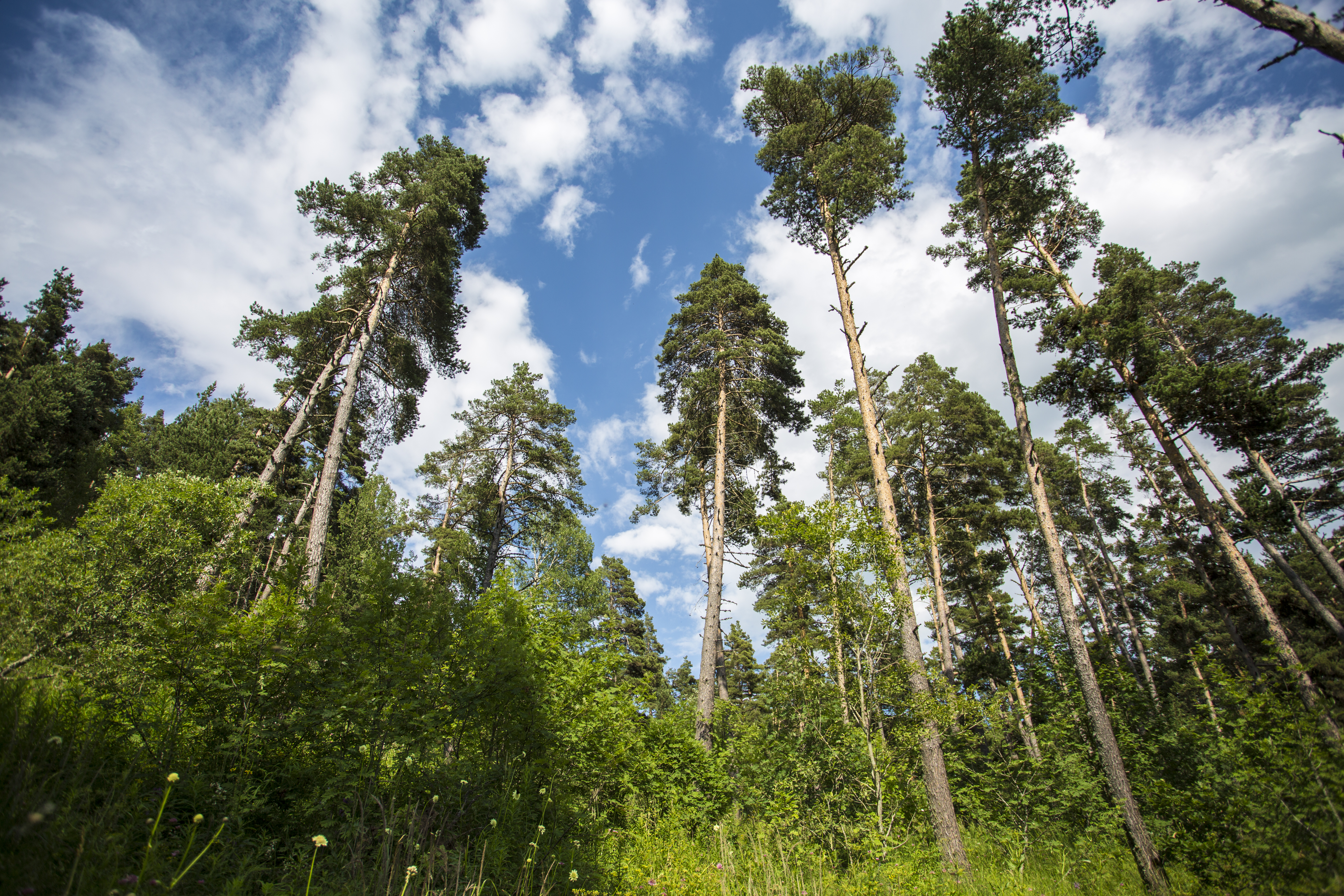
Pine forest on Tetrobi plateau.
