= Motsameta Monastery =

Cultural heritage monument in Georgia

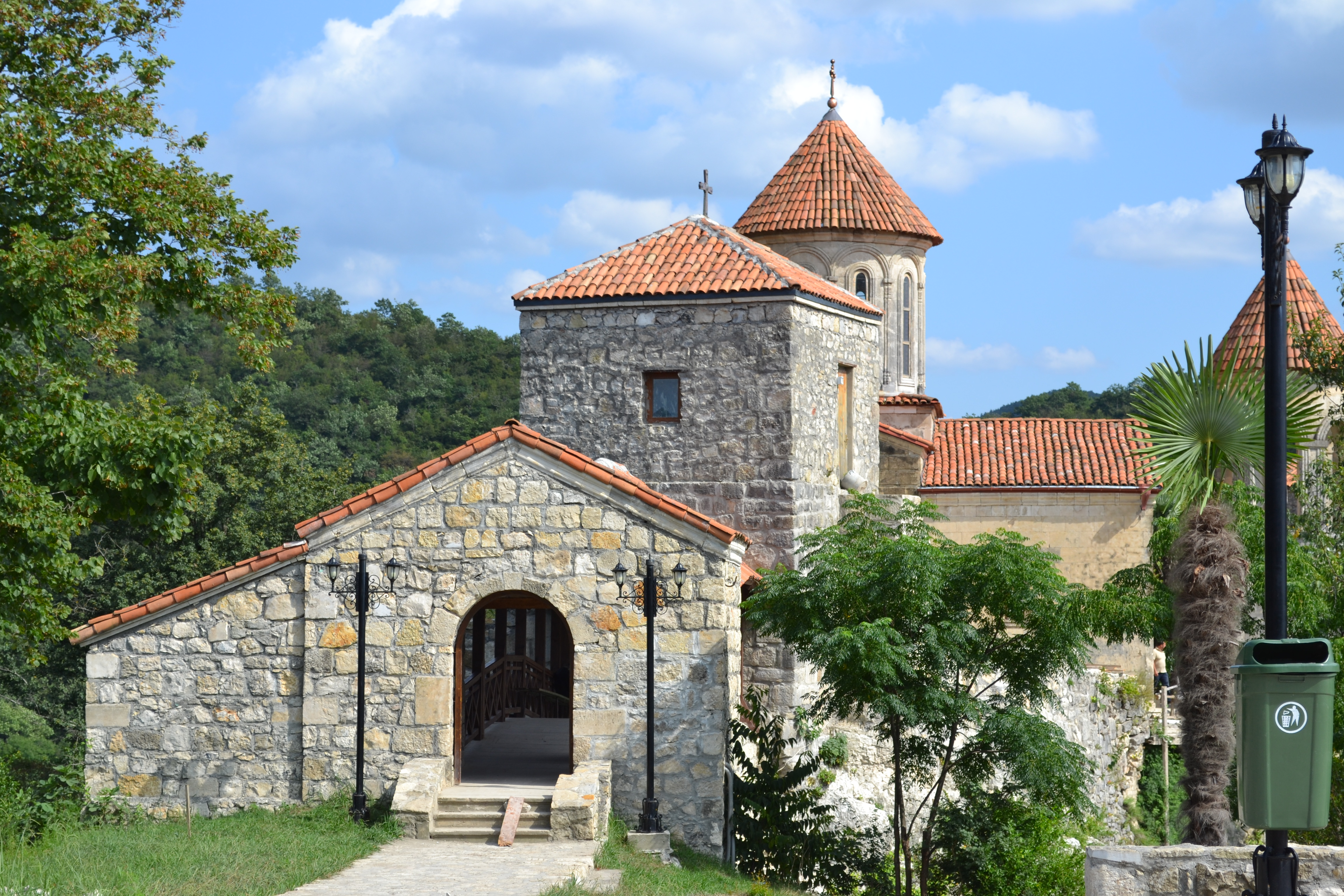
- The Motsameta Monastery

- Location within Imereti Location within Georgia

Religion
- Affiliation: Georgian Orthodox Church

Location
- Location: (Georgia (country)) Kutaisi, Georgia
- Interactive map of Motsameta Monastery
- Coordinates: 42°16′55″N 42°45′33″E

Architecture
- Type: Monastery, church, castle
- Style: Georgian

Motsameta (Georgian: მოწამეთა) also known as Motsameta Monastery is a complex of monasteries at the Imereti region, approximately 6 km northeast of the center of Kutaisi, Georgia. The monastery is picturesquely located on the cliff of a promontory in the curve of the Tskaltsitela river, a tributary of the Rioni river.

== History ==
Its name, whose meaning is the "Place of the Martyrs", is related to the brothers of a noble family of Argveti, David and Constantine, who organized a rebellion against the occupying Arabs in the 8th century.

When the rebellion failed, they were captured and then they were promised forgiveness in exchange for converting to Islam. None accepted the offer, and they were later tortured and killed, and their bodies were thrown into the river. The water turned red and in memory of this event, the river was called Ckalcitela, which means red water. According to the story, the brothers' remains were captured by the lions and taken to the hill, where the Gelati monastery is located. Later, the Orthodox Church of Georgia recognized them as Saints, and in the 11th century, the king Bagrat IV of Georgia founded a temple there. Officials from the Bolshevik secret police in 1923 took the remains of David and Constantine from the Gelati monastery to the museum in Kutaisi, but this caused such a scandal that the relics were delivered quickly and are still in the monasteries today. According to legend, there is a secret passage between the Motsameta monasteries and the Gelati monastery, used during the wars.

Monastery buildings

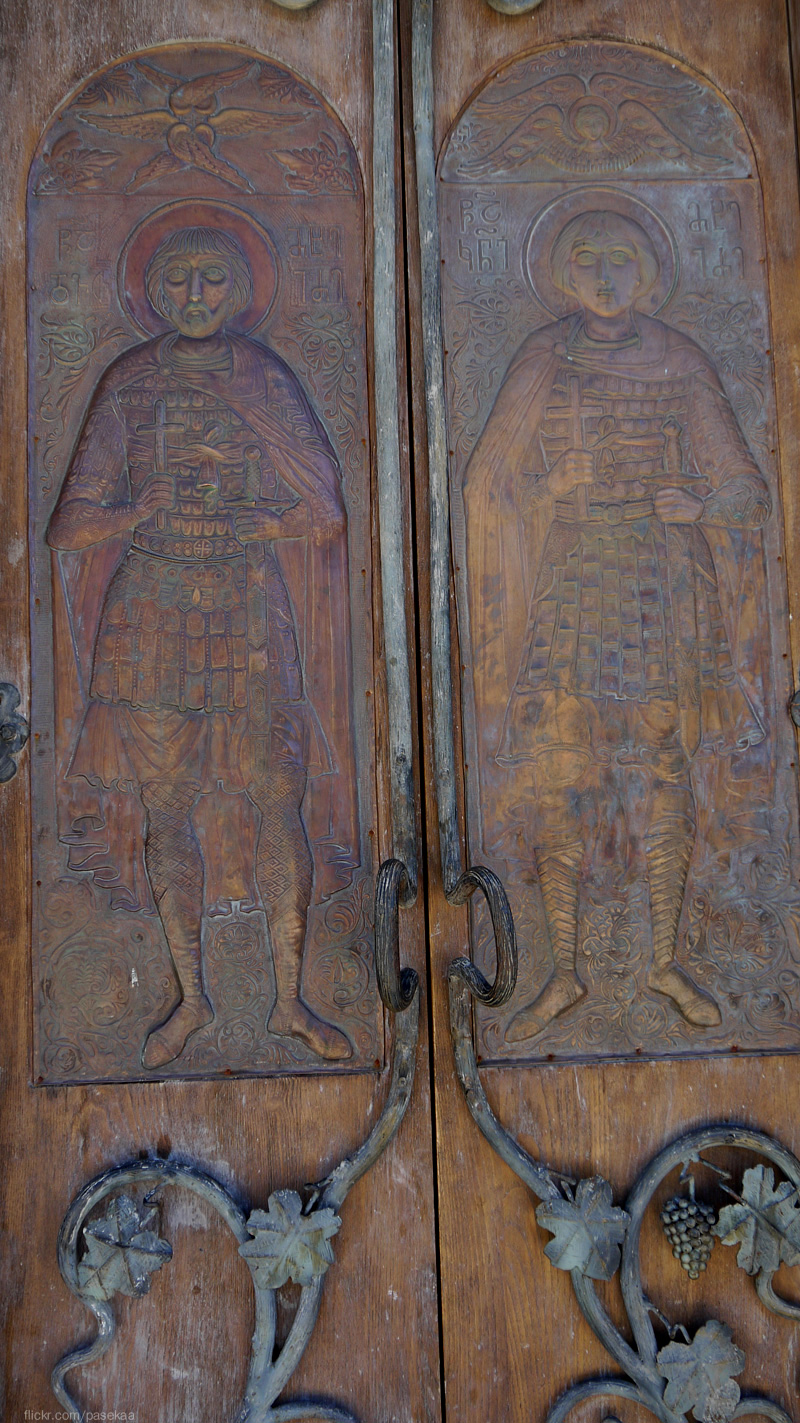
Georgian inscription of the Motsameta Monastery

== See also ==
- Gelati Monastery
