= Bodorna Rock Columns Natural Monument =

- IUCN category III (natural monument or feature)
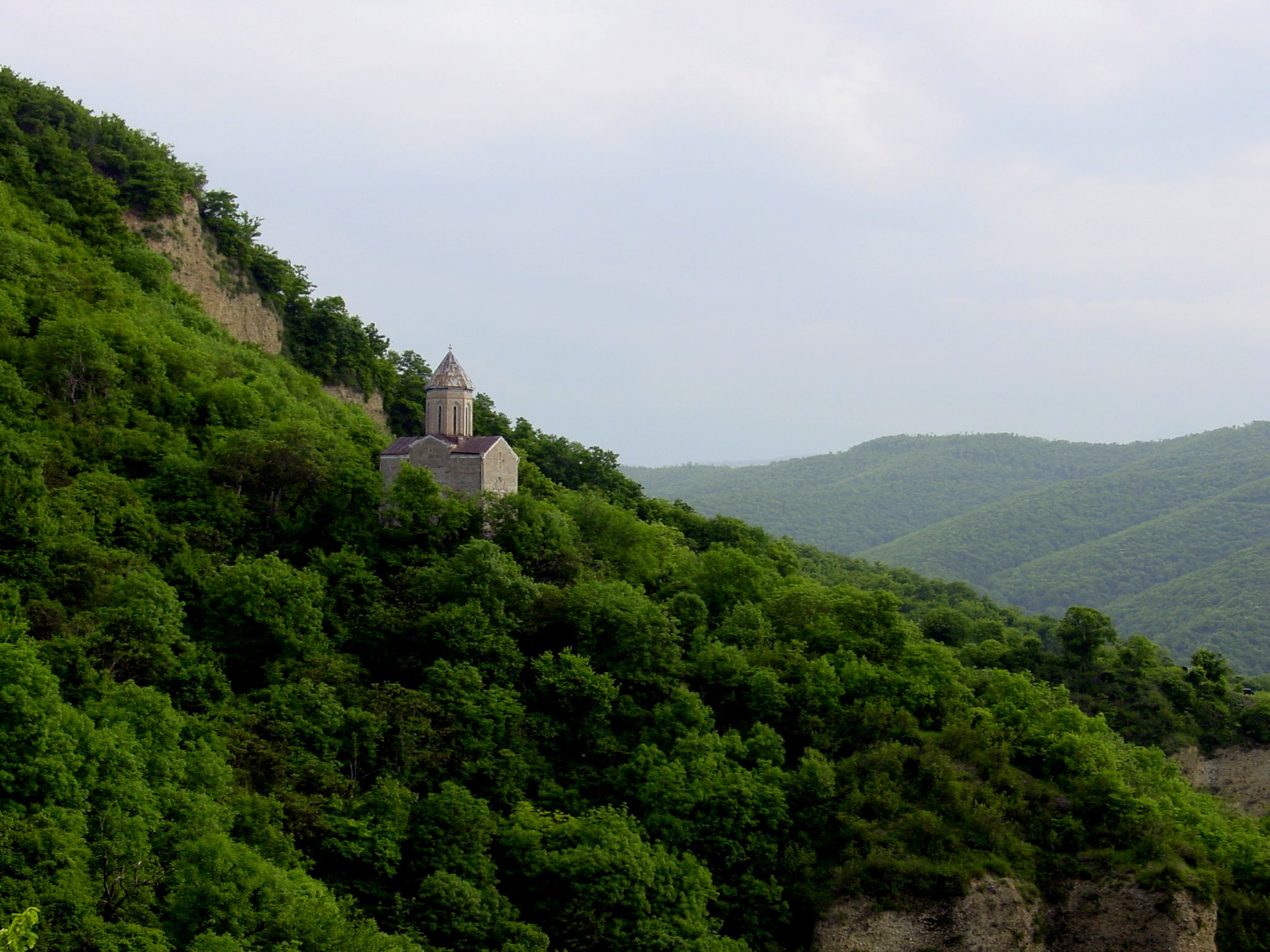
- Bodorna Church of St. Mary overlooking the Aragvi river

- Location within Georgia Location within Mtskheta-Mtianeti
- Location: Georgia
- Coordinates: 42°02′51″N 44°44′24″E
- Area: 0.18 km^{2} (0.069 sq mi)
- Established: 2013
- Governing body: Agency of Protected Areas
- Website: Bodorna Rock Column Natural Monument

Bodorna Rock Columns Natural Monument (Georgian: ბოდორნის სვეტი) is a rock pillar with a height of 15 m and diameter 4 m near village Bodorna of Dusheti Municipality, Mtskheta-Mtianeti Georgia at a distance of 70–80 m from the S3 highway (Georgia) at 813 m above sea level. Natural monument is located approximately 150–200 m from Bodorna Church of Saint Virgin Mary built in the 17th century and is overlooking the Aragvi valley from the river right bank on the slopes of eastern exposure. Locally this deemed natural tower is known as Tsotsola Rock and rumored to have some resemblance with figure of the Christian monk.

== Monument origin and history ==
Monument origin is not completely clear, as it may be a denudational relict from a neogene conglomerate or from naturally cemented cobbles known as pinnacle or hoodoo that was later altered by man for cult purposes. Detailed lithostratigraphy studies are not available. At the base the rock column has diameter of 4 m and column gradually narrows towards the top. Presently the column surface is covered with shrubbery. The column contains a small cave with two niches, one of many, that were utilized as a shelter by early Christian monks in Georgia, possibly in the V – VII centuries, and later during Timur's invasions of Georgia. The Georgian Chronicles reports that Timur's archers descended the column using ropes and shoot their arrows into the crowded cave. Nearby slopes has many similar man-made caves scattered around. Entire cave complex enjoys same protection as natural monument.

== See also ==
- List of natural monuments of Georgia
- S3 highway (Georgia)
