= Tskaltsitela Gorge Natural Monument =

River gorge in western Georgia

- Tskaltsitela Ravine Natural Monument
- IUCN category III (natural monument or feature)
- Tskaltsitela river canyon.

- Location within Georgia Location within Imereti
- Interactive map of Tskaltsitela Gorge Natural Monument
- Location: Georgia
- Nearest city: Kutaisi
- Coordinates: 42°16′40″N 42°45′22″E
- Area: 0.22 km^{2} (0.085 sq mi)
- Established: 2007
- Governing body: Agency of Protected Areas
- Website: Natural Monument

Tskaltsitela Gorge Natural Monument (Georgian: წყალწითელას ხეობის ბუნების ძეგლი) is a river gorge in western Georgia, in Tkibuli and Terjola municipalities. The historical and geographic name of this area of Georgia is Okriba. The main river in Okriba is the river Tskaltsitela, also spelled Tsqal-Tsitela (Georgian: წყალ-წითელა). The river got its name from the reddish color of the water: tsqal means water and tsitela means red in Georgian. The water acquires its color by washing clays containing iron rust. Tskaltsitela Gorge Natural Monument is a stretch of the Tskaltsitela river canyon approximately from Gelati Monastery Bridge all the way to Godagani Bridge at an elevation of 130–200 meters above sea level.

== Geography ==
The river Tskaltsitela rises from the south slopes of the Nakerala range, and crosses the whole territory of Okriba until it merges with the Kvirila River. The river source is located at the Nakerala Racha mountain ridge at 1080m above sea level. The river Tskaltsitela's length is 49 km, basin area 221 km^{2}. The main tributary is the river Chala. Nourishes mainly rain water. Floods are characteristic throughout the year. Average annual expenditures are 7.56 m³/s. The river Tskaltsitela borders the city of Kutaisi from the east.

== Geology ==
The Tskaltsitela ravine cuts into bedrock of carbonate formation from the Jurassic depositional age mostly represented by dolomites and dolomitized limestones. They belong to the lowest stage of the Cretaceous system and are called Neocomian sediments. Lithologically, these sediments are crystal limestones and on occasion dolomites. In small areas sediments of Cenomanian age are found as well. Lithologically, these sediments are limestones, marls, glauconitic sandstones and rarely clays and conglomerates. In the vicinity of the Tskaltsitela there are many natural quarries with chalcedony, barite, quartz sand, marble, basalt, agate, fireproof clays used for cement production, teshenit and other minerals. Coal mining has been under way in the vicinity of Tkibuli since the mid-19th century, but archeological excavations show that ore has been mined here since as early as 2nd millennium BC.

== Flora ==
The Tsaltsitela canyon has incredibly preserved Euxine-Colchic deciduous forests. Many medicinal plants can be found in the Tskaltsitela ravine, such as common yew (Taxus baccata), Imeretian hazelnut (Corylus imeretica), celandine (Cheli donium majus), black hawthorn (Crataegus pentagina), red hawthorn (Crataegus microphylla), Dorycnium graecum, shamrock (Oxalis acetocella), Persian berry or alder buckthorn (Frangula alnus), dwarf mallow (Malva neglecta), rockrose (Cistus salviifolius) and Lemon balm (Melissa officinalis). Many are rare endemic species of Georgia and can be found on calcareous ecotopes of Tsaltsitela gorge in proximity of Gelati monastery.

== Fauna ==
River has a rich variety of fish species: trout, Bulatmai barbell (Barbus capito carpito), Terek barbel (Barbus ciscaucasicus), Luciobarbus mursa, European chub (Squalius cephalus), Colchic nase (Chondrostoma colchicum), Caspian shamaya (Alburnus chalcoides) and others. Banks of the river are inhabited by nutria (Myocastor coypus). During the winter the river is home to waterfowl birds. A variety of mammals also live here — golden jackal (Canis aureus), red fox (Vulpes vulpes) and European badger (Meles meles).

== Cultural history ==
Tskaltsitela gorge is home for a number of monuments of historical and cultural interest: Gelati Monastery Complex, Motsameta Monastery of Saint Martyrs and Constantine Monastery. In 1757 the famous Battle of Khresili was conducted here. According to the legend, the name of the tskaltsitela (tszulitela) was given to gorge after the Battle of Khresili, because the blood of fallen warriors painted river rocks in red.

== Tourism and resorts ==
There are some important resort areas on the territory of Okriba in area close to Tskaltsitela Gorge Natural Monument, including Satsire — a medical resort for children with allergies, bronchitis, pneumonia, inherent heart disease and bronchial asthma. Balneotherapy at the resort includes the application of nitric, slightly sulfide, hydro-carbonate, magnesium-calcium containing mineral waters.

== See also ==
- Motsameta Monastery
- Tskaltsitela
- List of mammals of Georgia (country)
