= Terjola =

Terjola თერჯოლა
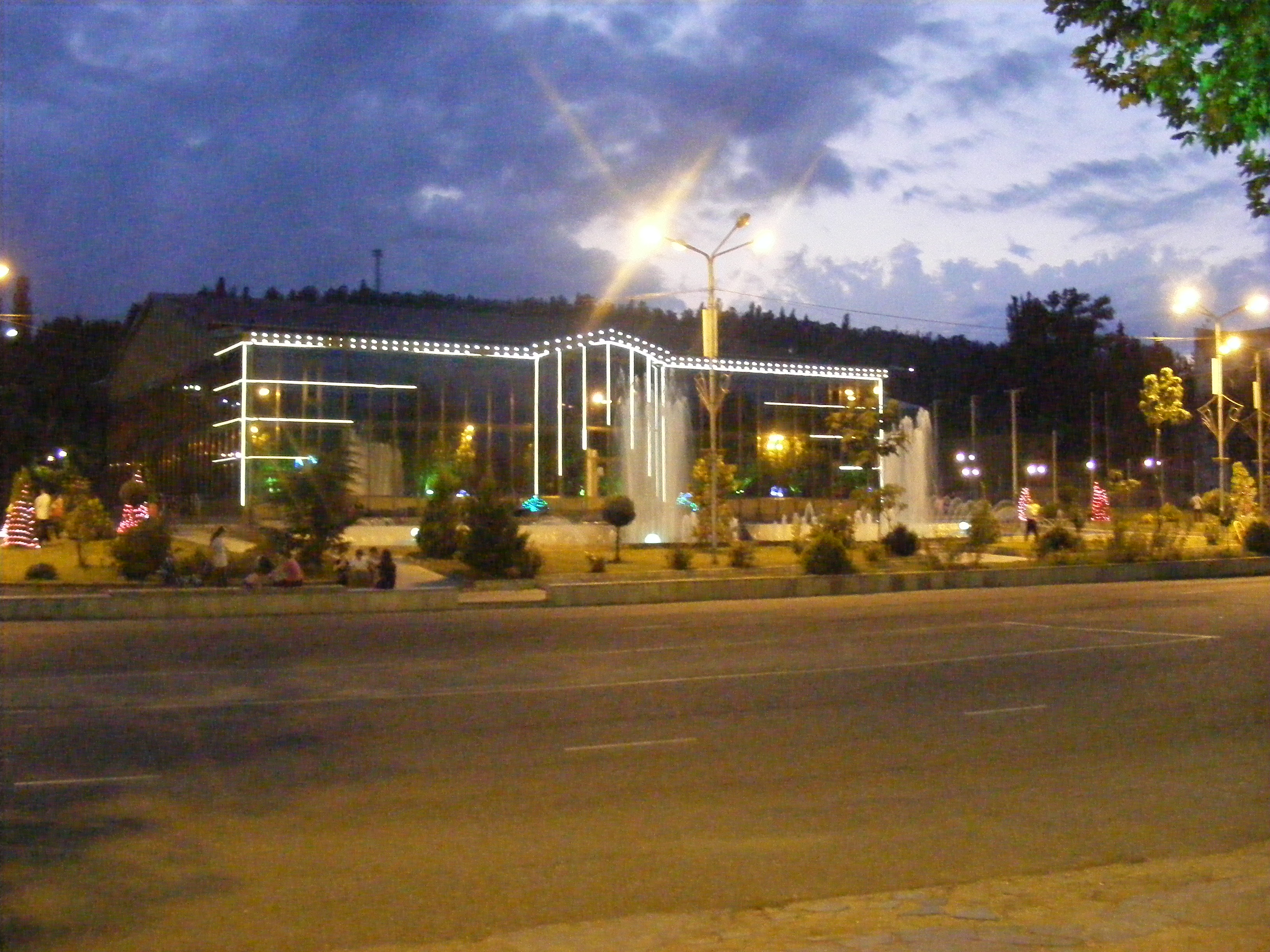
- Terjola sport's palace
- Interactive map of Terjola
- Location within Georgia Location within Imereti
- Coordinates: 42°11′00″N 42°58′38″E
- Country: Georgia (country)
- Mkhare: Imereti
- District: Terjola
- Elevation: 170 m (560 ft)

Population (2024)
  - Total: 4,818
- Time zone: UTC+4 (Georgian Time)
- Climate: Cfa

Terjola (Georgian: თერჯოლა [t̪ʰe̞ɾd͡ʒo̞ɫä]) is a town in Imereti, Georgia, serving as an administrative center of the homonymous district.

Terjola is situated in the Imereti Lowlands in western Georgia, on the right bank of the Chkhara river. It lies on the Tbilisi-Zestaponi highway, 190 km northwest of Tbilisi and 14 km northwest of Zestaponi. Its population is 4,644.

Terjola is first mentioned in the 17th-century sources. It acquired the status of a town in 1983.

There are a series of historical and cultural landmarks in the environs of Terjola such as the Skande fortress, the ruins of the Gogni fort and church, and the Chkhalti church complex with its numerous antiquities now displayed in the museums of Georgia.

== Notable natives ==
- Mirian Giorgadze (born 1976), Greco-Roman wrestler

== See also ==
- List of cities and towns in Georgia (country)
- Imereti
