= Pseudotyphlopasilia =

Scientific classification
- Kingdom: Animalia
- Phylum: Arthropoda
- Class: Insecta
- Order: Coleoptera
- Suborder: Polyphaga
- Infraorder: Staphyliniformia
- Family: Staphylinidae
- Genus: Pseudotyphlopasilia; Pace, 1983

Synonyms
- Typhlusa Pace, 1983

Genus of beetles

Pseudotyphlopasilia is a genus of beetles belonging to the family Staphylinidae.

Species:

- Pseudotyphlopasilia anophthalma (Bernhauer, 1903)
- Pseudotyphlopasilia coeca (Eppelsheim, 1878)
