= Xiphocaridinella =

Scientific classification
- Domain: Eukaryota
- Kingdom: Animalia
- Phylum: Arthropoda
- Class: Malacostraca
- Order: Decapoda
- Suborder: Pleocyemata
- Infraorder: Caridea
- Family: Atyidae
- Genus: Xiphocaridinella; Sadowsky, 1930

Genus of crustaceans

Xiphocaridinella is a genus of shrimps belonging to the family Atyidae.

The species of this genus are found in Western Asia.

Species:

- Xiphocaridinella ablaskiri Birstein, 1939
- Xiphocaridinella dbari Marin, 2019
- Xiphocaridinella fagei Birstein, 1939
- Xiphocaridinella falcirostris Marin, 2020
- Xiphocaridinella jusbaschjani Birstein, 1948
- Xiphocaridinella kumistavi Marin, 2017
- Xiphocaridinella kutaissiana Sadowsky, 1930
- Xiphocaridinella motena Marin, 2019
- Xiphocaridinella osterloffi Juzbasjan, 1940
- Xiphocaridinella otapi Marin, 2018
- Xiphocaridinella shurubumu Marin, 2018
- Xiphocaridinella smirnovi Marin, 2020
