= Khomuli Cave Natural Monument =

Cave in Georgia

- IUCN category III (natural monument or feature)
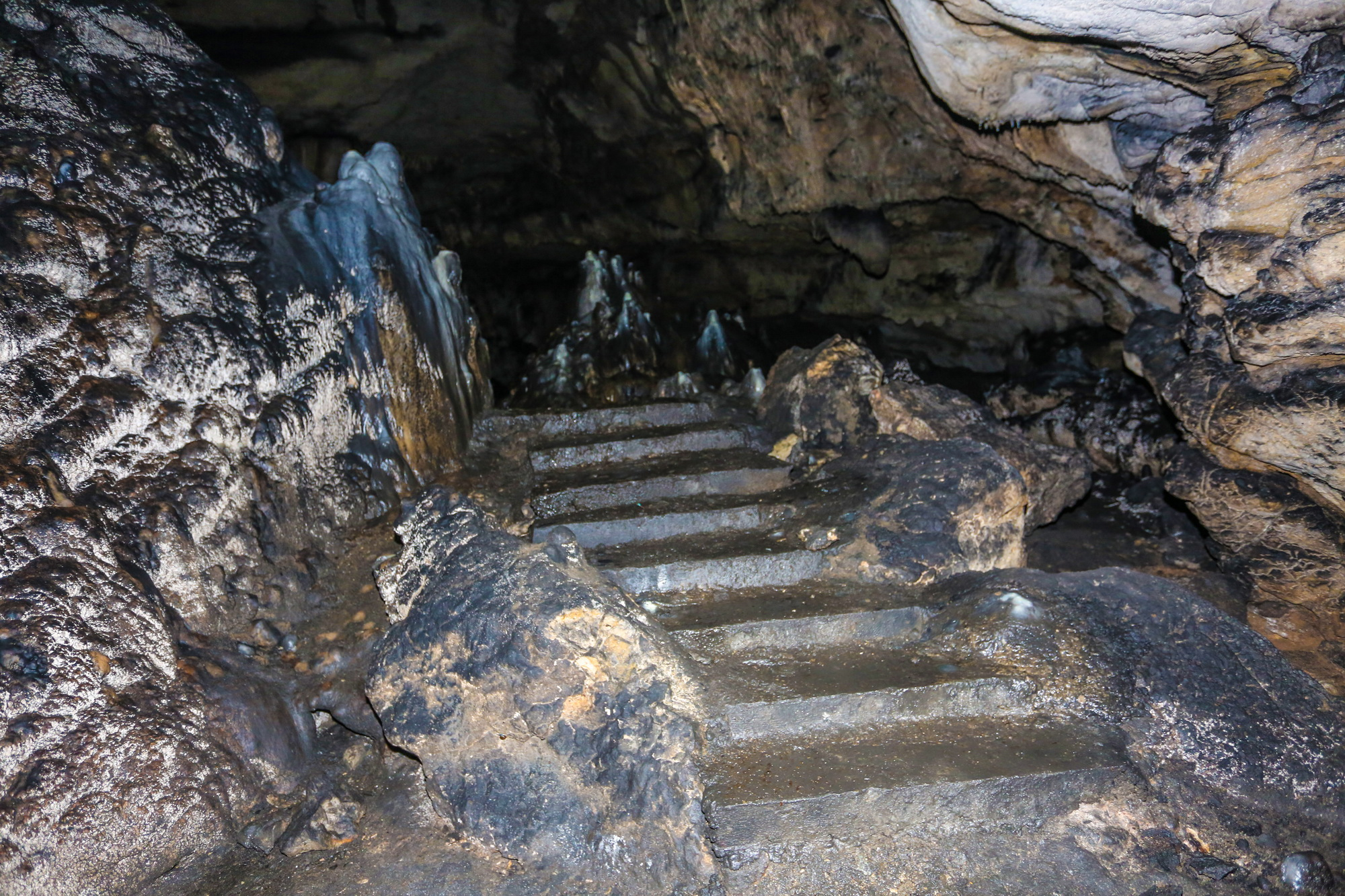
- Inside Khomuli Cave

- Location within Georgia Location within Imereti
- Nearest city: Tsqaltubo
- Coordinates: 42°18′53.3″N 42°38′07.0″E
- Area: 0.01 km^{2} (0.0039 sq mi)
- Established: 2007
- Governing body: Agency of Protected Areas
- Website: ხომულის მღვიმის ბუნების ძეგლი

Khomuli Cave Natural Monument (Georgian: ხომულის მღვიმე) is a karst cave located 3.7 km to the south from village Khomuli, Tsqaltubo Municipality in Imereti region of Georgia, 160 meters above sea level.

== Morphology ==
Khomuli karst cave was formed in limestones. Total length - 4 kilometers. In the front of the cave entrance, on the surface, there is an oval-shaped lake, 5 meters deep and 30 meters in circumference. Through the underground waterways lake is connected to the Tsqaltubo water reservoir (Tsivi Lake). At the cave entrance there is a raised cornice. Cave is divided into two parts. The main part is rather extensive with numerous karst formations, some looks like footprints. The other part is a narrow tunnel, which can be accessed only with special equipment. At the bottom of the tunnel there is a small lake.

== See also ==
- Sataplia Strict Nature Reserve
