= Ochkhomuri Waterfall Natural Monument =

- IUCN category III (natural monument or feature)
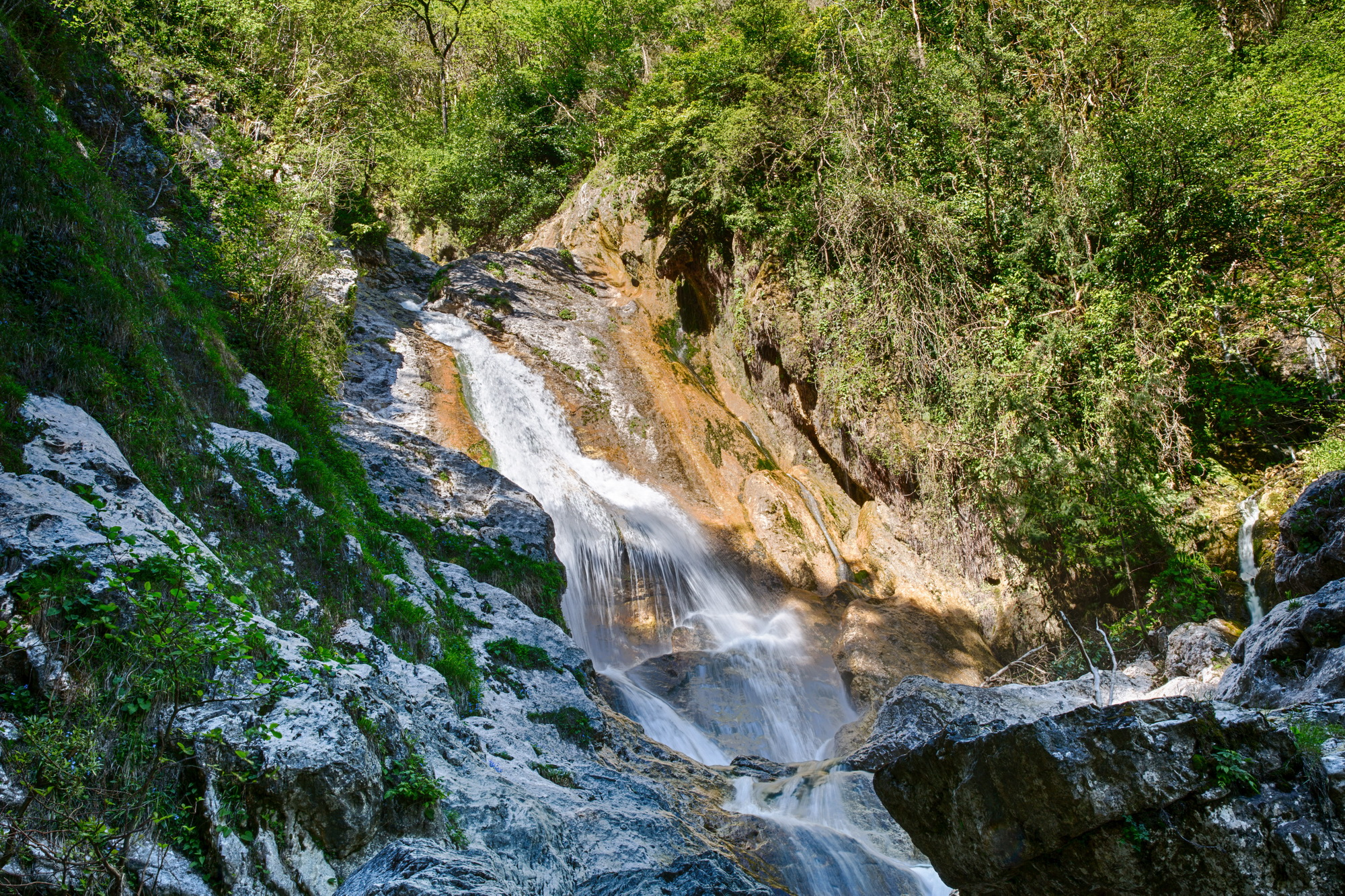
- Ochkhomuri Waterfall Natural Monument

- Location within Georgia Location within Samegrelo-Zemo Svaneti
- Nearest city: village Kurzu of Martvili Municipality
- Coordinates: 42°36.671′N 42°18.035′E
- Area: 0.09 km^{2} (0.035 sq mi)
- Website: Ochkhomuri Waterfall Natural Monument

Ochkhomuri Waterfall Natural Monument (Georgian: ოჩხომურის ჩანჩქერის ბუნების ძეგლი) is a waterfall with a height of 100–120 m at 469 m above sea level in Martvili Municipality, Samegrelo-Zemo Svaneti region of Georgia. It originates in cave at Migaria limestone massif, at the source of Ochkhomuri River. At first the waterfall flows from the slope of the southern exposure, then in the middle it turns into south-eastern exposure, whereas the last part flows from the southern exposure. Each step of the waterfall creates small lake after touching the ground. From afar the waterfall looks like a solid column. The excessive humidity around the waterfall gives way to peculiar flora and fauna. One can find abundance of rare, endemic or relict species here.

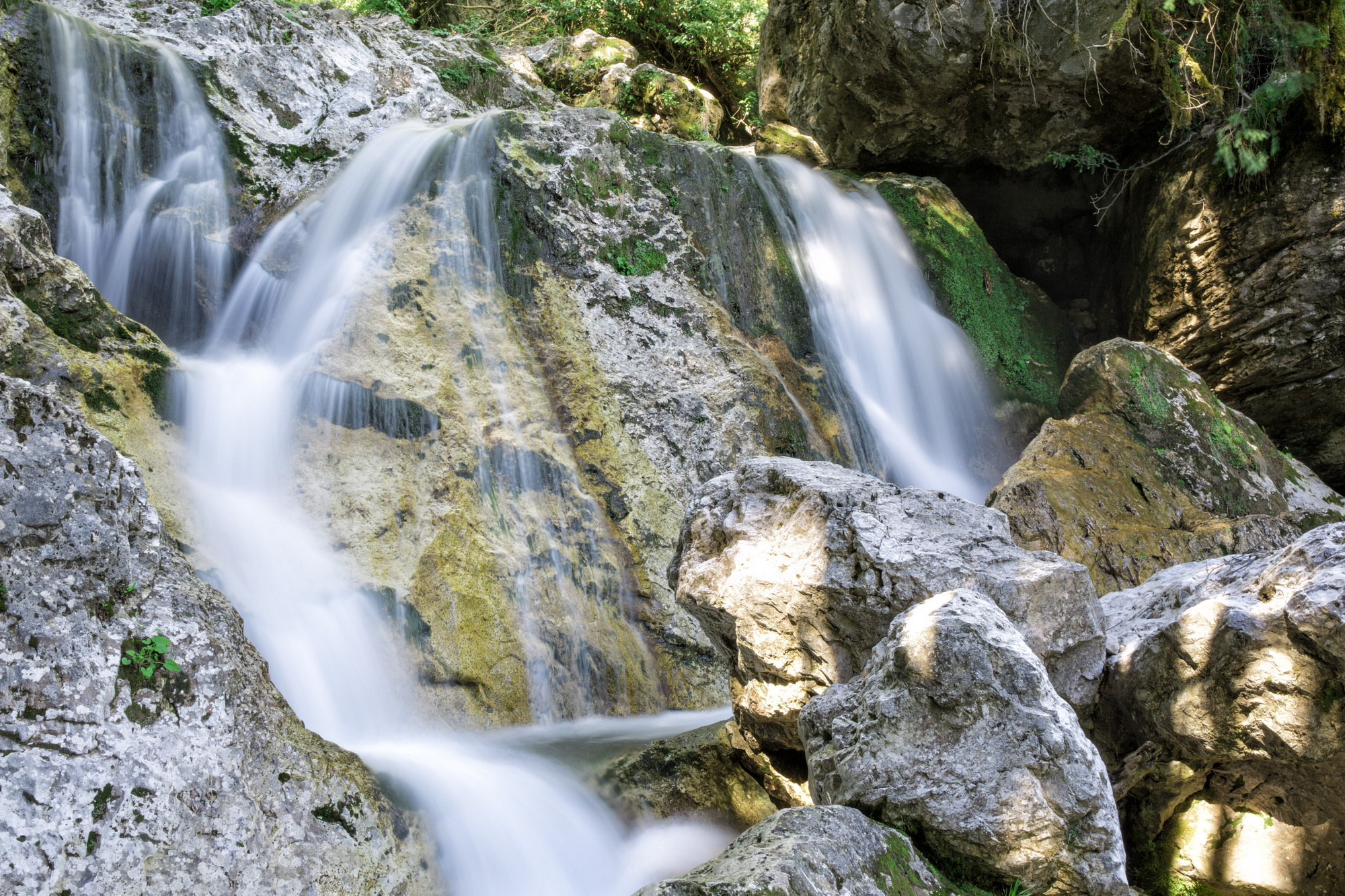
Ochkhomuri waterfall.
