= Pshav-Khevsureti National Park =

National park in Georgia

- IUCN category II (national park)
- Khevsureti, village Shatili

- Location within Georgia Location within Mtskheta-Mtianeti
- Location: Georgia
- Coordinates: 42.66°N 45.16°E
- Area: 1,400.44 km^{2} (540.71 sq mi)
- Established: 2014
- Governing body: Agency of Protected Areas
- Website: National Park Info

Pshav-Khevsureti National Park (Georgian: ფშავ-ხევსურეთის ეროვნული პარკი) is in Dusheti Municipality, Mtskheta-Mtianeti region of Georgia. Park has been established by direct involvement of World Wide Fund for Nature.

== Fauna ==
Pshav-Khevsureti National Park will help conservation of the leopard (Panthera pardus) in the Caucasus, as well as the Bezoar goat (Capra aegagrus aegagrus), endemic East Caucasian tur (Capra cylindricornis), brown bear, European lynx, Caspian red deer, chamois.

== Tourist infrastructure ==
Pshav-Khevsureti National Park can be reached using Tbilisi-Zhinvali-Barisakho-Shatili route.

== See also ==
- List of protected areas of Georgia
