= Nazodelavo Cave Natural Monument =

Cave in Georgia

- Nazodelavo Cavern
- IUCN category III (natural monument or feature)
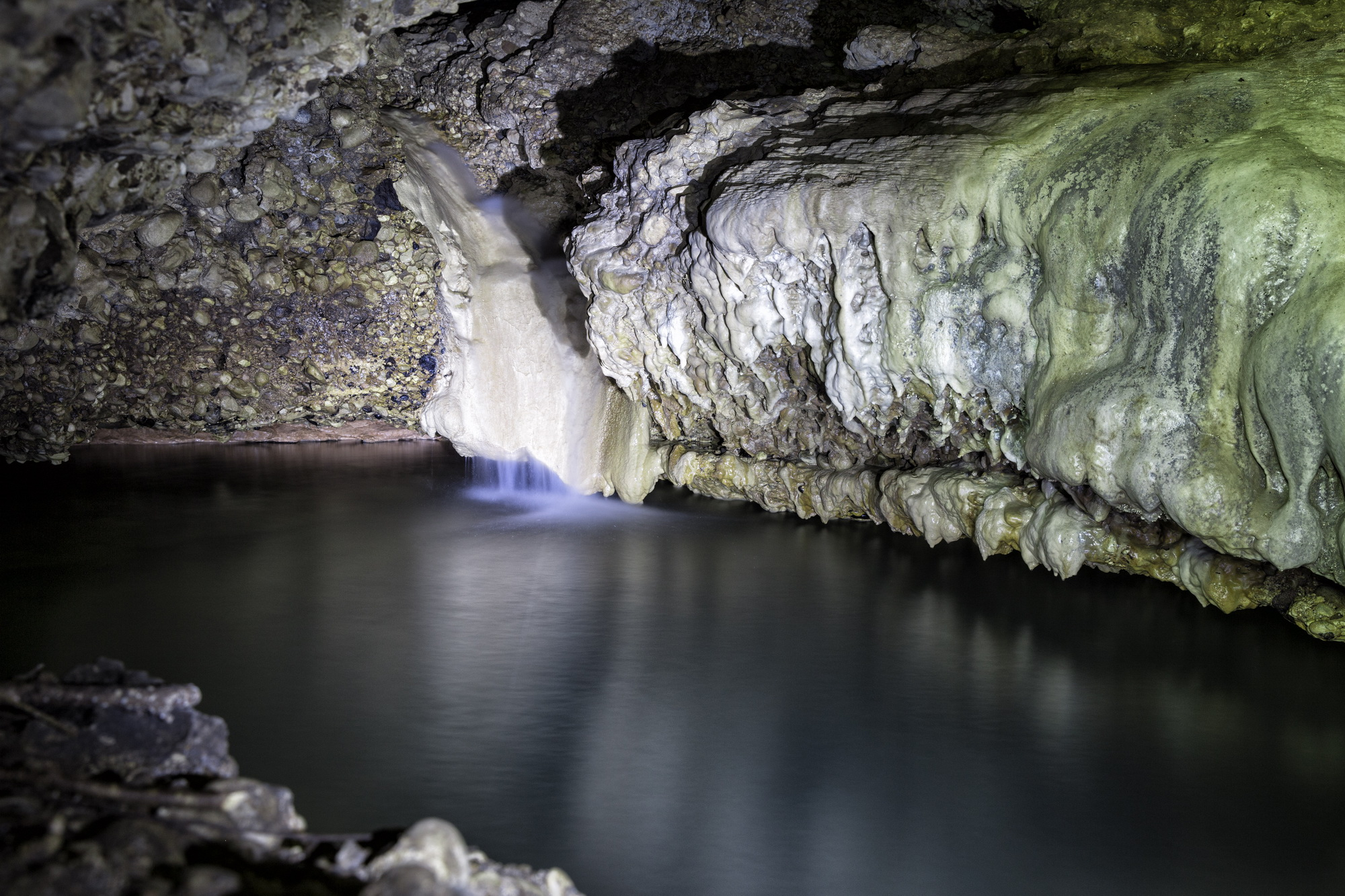

- Location within Georgia Location within Imereti
- Nearest city: Zugdidi
- Coordinates: 42°30′21.9″N 42°13′16.3″E
- Area: 0.14 km^{2} (0.054 sq mi)
- Established: 2013
- Governing body: Agency of Protected Areas
- Website: Nazodelavo Cave Natural Monument

Nazodelavo Cave Natural Monument (Georgian: ნაზოდელავოს მღვიმე) is a karst cave 6.8 km to the north from village Akhuti in Chkhorotsqu Municipality in Samegrelo-Zemo Svaneti region of Georgia. Cave is located on the left bank of river Zana (Khobi river tributary), 290 meters above sea level. Nazodelavo means the dwelling of Zodelavos. According to cave narratives, it was used as a means of defense in the middle ages.

== Morphology ==
Nazodelavo karst cave formed in a conglomerates of the Neogene geologic period in Odishi plain karst massif. Cave is 600 m long with main tunnel average width of 4 m and height 3 m. The two main outlets are narrower and shorter than the main cave tunnel. A cold underground river with clear water flows through an erosion canyon in cave floor. In some places depth of the erosion canyon reaches 7-8 meters.

== Fauna ==
In the cave and in the surrounding area on the surface there are summer moths. The inhabitants of the cave include Lepidocyrtus, Folsomia and Oxychilus.

== See also ==
- Prometheus Cave Natural Monument
