= Tetra Cave Natural Monument =

Limestone cave

- White Cave, Belaya Cave, Tskaltubskaya Stalaktitovaya Cave
- IUCN category III (natural monument or feature)
- Location within Georgia Location within Imereti
- Nearest city: Tskaltubo
- Coordinates: 42°19′46″N 42°37′02″E
- Area: 0.01 km^{2} (0.0039 sq mi)
- Established: 2011
- Governing body: Agency of Protected Areas
- Website: White Cave Natural Monument

Tetra Cave Natural Monument (Georgian: თეთრა მღვიმე) is a karst cave 1.6 km northwest of Tskaltubo in Tskaltubo Municipality in Imereti region of Georgia. Locally known as White Cave it is located 140 meters above sea level.

== Morphology ==
Tetra Cave formed in the Sataphlia-Tskaltubo karst massif. It is naturally decorated with chalk limestone that provides plenty of white color in cave interior. Cave entrance is protected by special door which hides vertical hole, 2 meter in diameter, with a long, horizontal bottom floor which leads to 25 m long and 3.5 m high cave made of limestone, with characteristic remains of white chalk. Cave has an interesting diversity of old siphon channels.

== Fauna ==
The inhabitants of the cave are Trachysphaera, Colchidoniscus, Neobisium, Aedes, Dolichopoda, Neelus, Mesogastrura, Pygmarrhopalites, Heteromurus, Lepidocyrtus, Folsomia, Plutomurus, Tegenaria, Carpathonesticus, Archileucogeorgia and Oxychilus.

== Health resort ==
Cave is hosting first speleotherapy facility in Georgia. Patients with bronchial asthma and hypertension have been treated here for the past century. Measurements of radon and light ions were conducted inside the cave in the summer of 2018. Measured value of radon content was 200÷257 Bq/m^{3} and the summary alpha radioactivity in cave air was in the range of 600÷771Bq/m^{3}. Measured light ions concentration was 18200÷22250 cm^{−3} for positive and 24000÷24280 cm^{−3} for negative ions. Based on these measurements it was concluded that microclimatic, bioclimatic and ionizing conditions in the cave are appropriate for therapeutic purposes.

== Archeological site ==
Cave is a known important archeological site. Ancient artifacts like pottery remains as well as bones of various animals, such as cave bear, deer, bison, wolf, fox and rabbit, has been found here.

== See also ==
- Speleotherapy
