= Gabzaruli Tba Natural Monument =

Lake in Georgia

- IUCN category III (natural monument or feature)
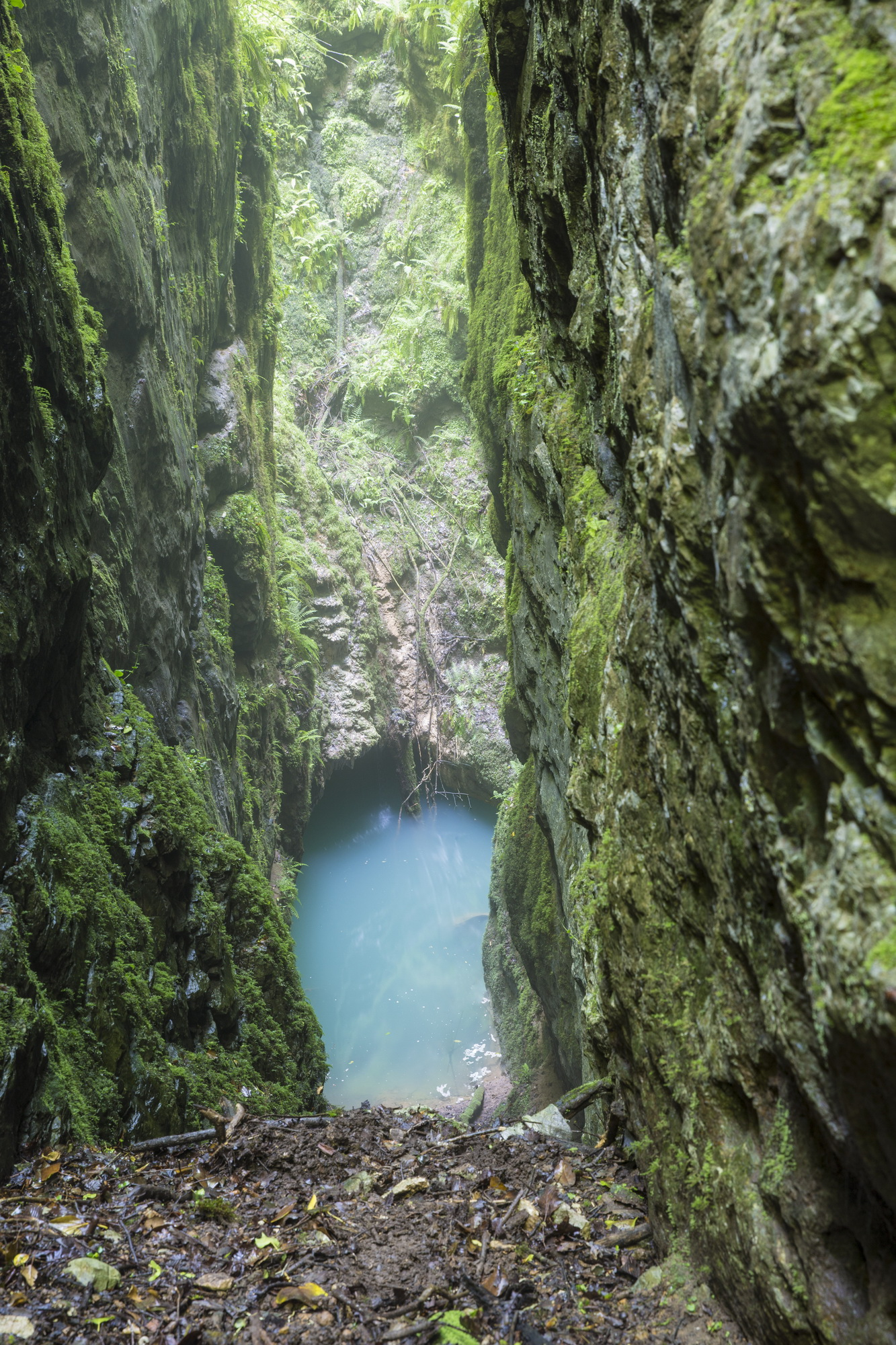
- Gabzaruli Tba (Cracked Lake) Natural Monument

- Location within Georgia Location within Imereti
- Nearest city: Tskaltubo
- Coordinates: 42°22′42″N 42°35′26″E
- Established: 2011
- Governing body: Agency of Protected Areas
- Website: გაბზარული ტბის ბუნების ძეგლი

Gabzaruli Tba Natural Monument also known as Cracked Lake Natural Monument (Georgian: გაბზარული ტბა) is a small siphon lake in Georgia region Imereti, Tskaltubo Municipality, in the village Kumistavi, 166 meters above the sea level. The villagers also call it Tskrvaram. Gabzaruli Tba or Cracked Lake is about 5 m long, 4.5 m wide and 60 m deep. The siphon lake is part of unexplored cave system and lies in a 45 m deep canyon created by tectonic rupture. Steep canyon slopes are covered with deciduous forest. Villagers use lake water for drinking and also do fishing and swimming in the lake.
