= Ghliana Cave Natural Monument =

Karst cave in Georgia

- IUCN category III (natural monument or feature)
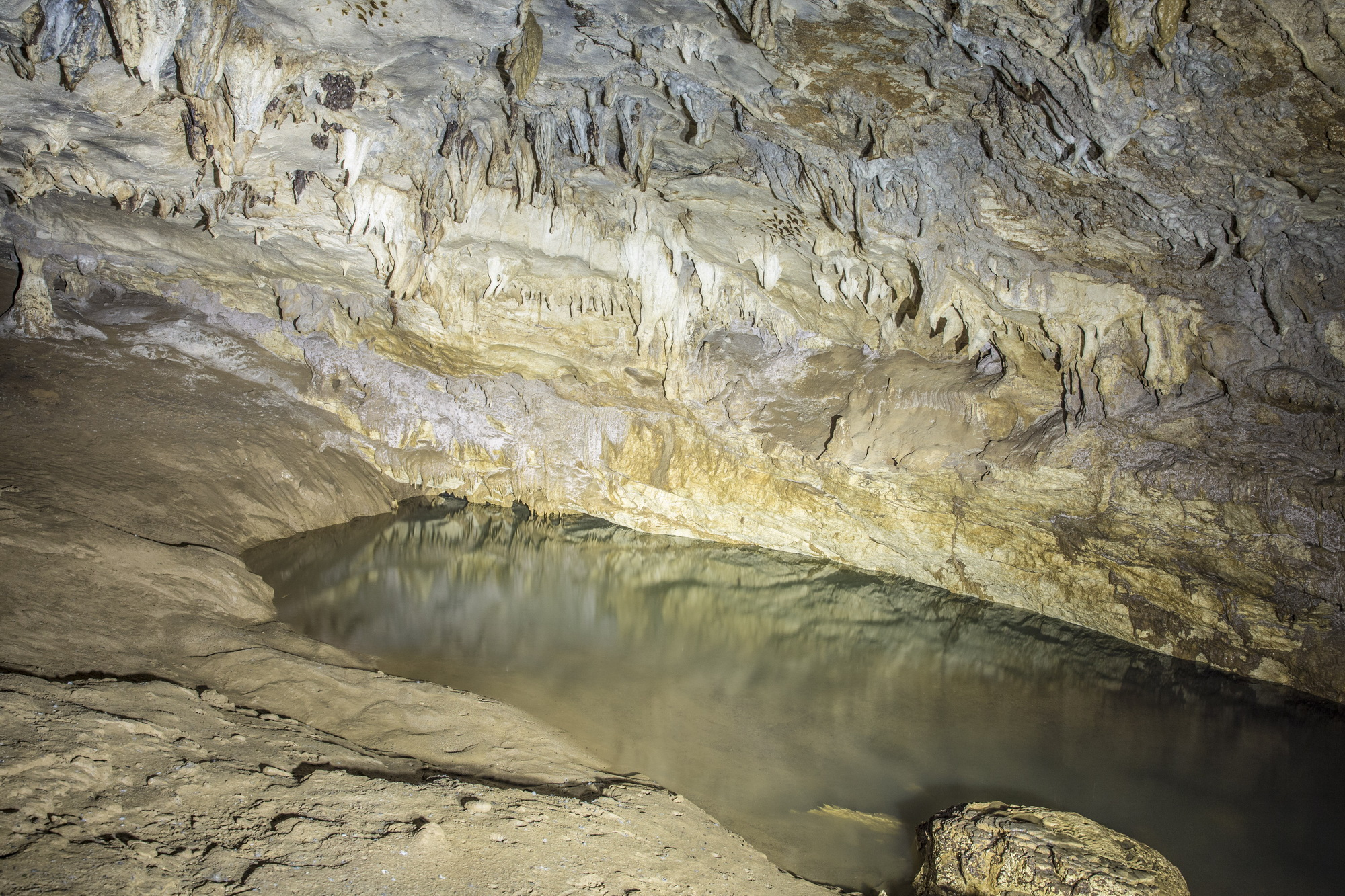
- Lake in Ghliana cave.

- Location within Georgia Location within Imereti
- Nearest city: Tskaltubo
- Coordinates: 42°22′20.3″N 42°35′50.5″E
- Established: 2011
- Governing body: Agency of Protected Areas
- Website: ღლიანას მღვიმის ბუნების ძეგლი

Ghliana Cave Natural Monument (Georgian: ღლიანას მრვიმე) is a karst cave located near village Kumistavi, Tsqaltubo Municipality in Imereti region of Georgia, 142 meters above sea level.

== Morphology ==
Ghliana karst cave is carved in limestone and has two entrances. The main entrance has a height of 3.5–4 meters, and width of 7 meters (23 ft). The main underground stream flows from this entrance. The second entrance to the left from the main entrance is very steep and measures 35–40 m (115–131 ft) from cave floor to the surface. 60 meters from entrance there is a deep siphon lake, 3–4 m (9.8–13.1 ft) wide, 2.5 m (8 ft 2 in) high above the lake surface and 50 meters long. Behind the lake there is a 200 m-long (660 ft) siphon corridor with it floor under water with depth of 0.5–2 meters. Behind the corridor there is a gallery with a length of 30 m (98 ft) and a width of 1–2 m (3 ft 3 in – 6 ft 7 in). It traverses the bigger 150 m (490 ft) gallery with ceiling covered with stalactites almost it entire length. This gallery again has water and several siphonous exits to the bottom of the cave. The underground flow measures 50–55 litres per second in a flood. The water streams from the cave end up in Kumi river.

== Fauna ==
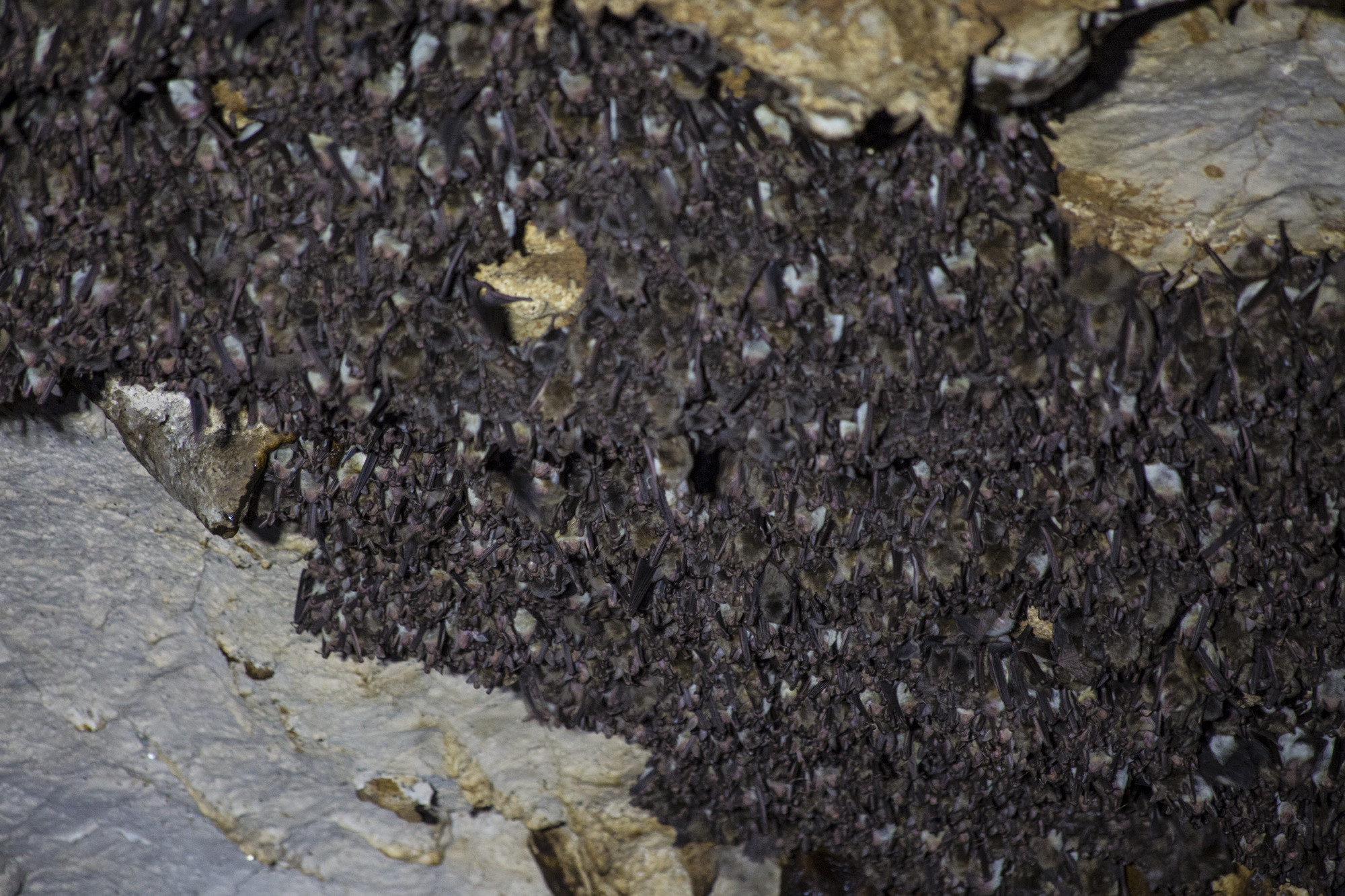
Bats maternity colony in the cave.

Numerous colonies of bats inhabit the dry corridors of the cave. The inhabitants of the cave also include Trachysphaera, Attheyella, Pilocamptus, Deuterosminthurus, Proisotoma, Hypoaspis and Macrocheles.

== See also ==
- Prometheus Cave Natural Monument
