= Sphaerozetes =

Scientific classification
- Kingdom: Animalia
- Phylum: Arthropoda
- Subphylum: Chelicerata
- Class: Arachnida
- Order: Oribatida
- Family: Ceratozetidae
- Genus: Sphaerozetes; Berlese, 1885

Genus of arachnids

Sphaerozetes is a genus of mites belonging to the family Ceratozetidae.

The species of this genus are found in Europe and Northern America.

Species:

- Oribates convexulus (Koch & Berendt, 1854)
- Sphaerozetes affinis (Trägårdh, 1907)
