= Jortsku Cave Natural Monument =

- IUCN category III (natural monument or feature)
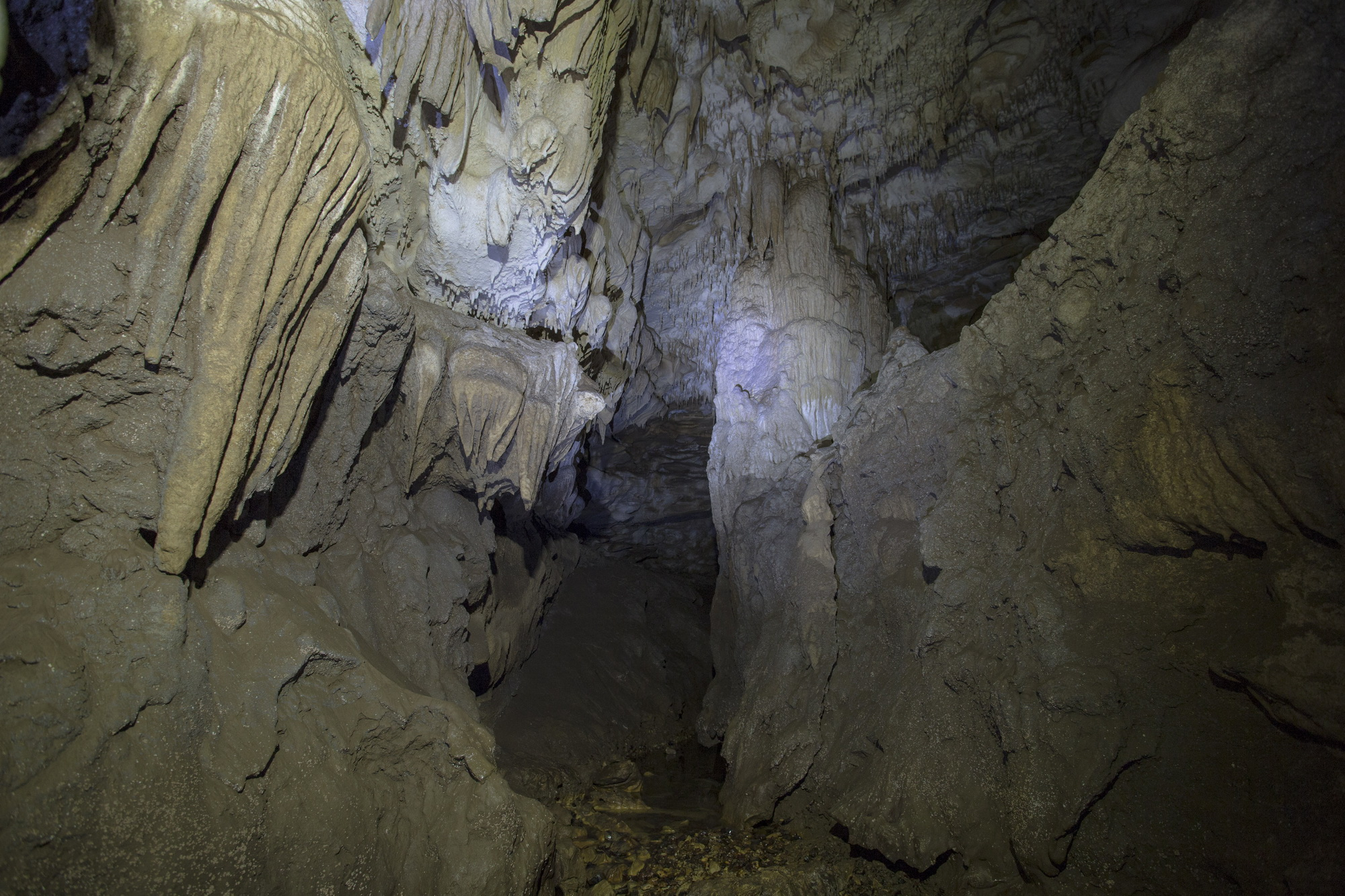
- Jortsku Cave

- Location within Georgia Location within Samegrelo-Zemo Svaneti
- Nearest city: Martvili
- Coordinates: 42°30′34.4″N 42°25′04.0″E
- Area: 0.03 km^{2} (0.012 sq mi)
- Established: 2013
- Governing body: Agency of Protected Areas
- Website: ჯორწყუს მღვიმის ბუნების ძეგლი

Jortsku Cave Natural Monument (Georgian: ჯორწყუს მღვიმე) is a karst cave located 5.5 km to the north of village Second Balda in Martvili Municipality in Samegrelo-Zemo Svaneti region of Georgia, 653 meters above sea level. Cave is on the left bank of Jortsku river, the tributary of Abasha river.

== Morphology ==
Jortsku Cave has two storey and maximum length of 276 m. Large entrance hallway leads to a meandering corridor, 3-5 m high and 4-5 m wide. Near the cave entrance ceiling collapsed in the past. Further inside, about 100 meters from the entrance, two branches emerges, one of which opens to the second floor with 30 m long hall. Stalactites are predominant feature of Jortsku Cave, but a few stalagmites also can be seen. 3.5 to 4 m thick plastic clay is in abundance in the cave hall. The stream flows into the cave, than joins the second stream, and after 15 m passes through to emerge as a spring on the left bank of the Jortsku river. The temperature in the entrance part of the cave is 18°C, gradually dropping to 11.5°C in the last section of the cave.

== Paleontological findings ==
Paleontological findings established presence of cave dwellers in an ancient past. Bones of cave bears, lynx, and other animals also has been found in the cave.
