= Terjola Municipality =

District in Georgia

Coordinates: 42°10′41″N 42°58′48″E

Terjola Municipality თერჯოლის მუნიციპალიტეტი
- Municipality
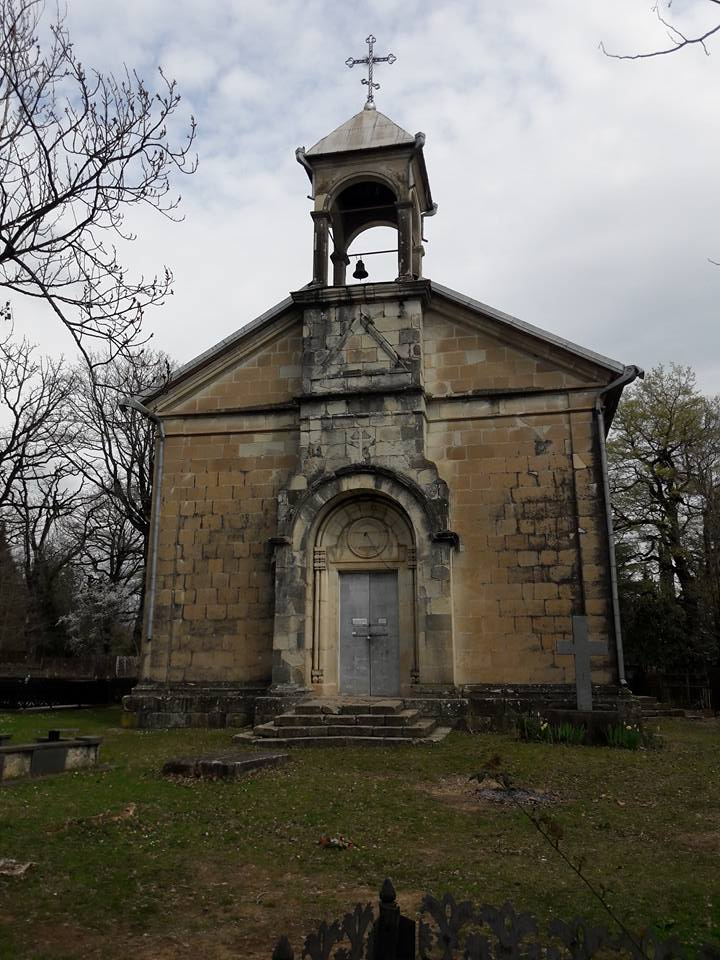
- Church in Bardubani

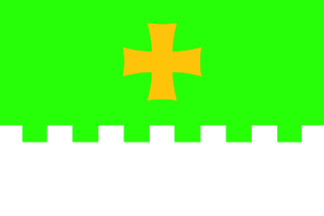
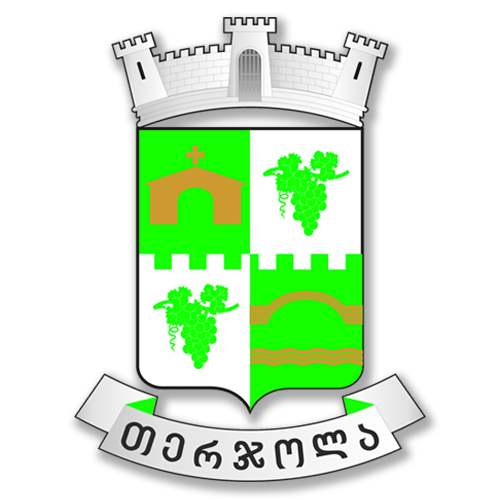
- Flag Seal

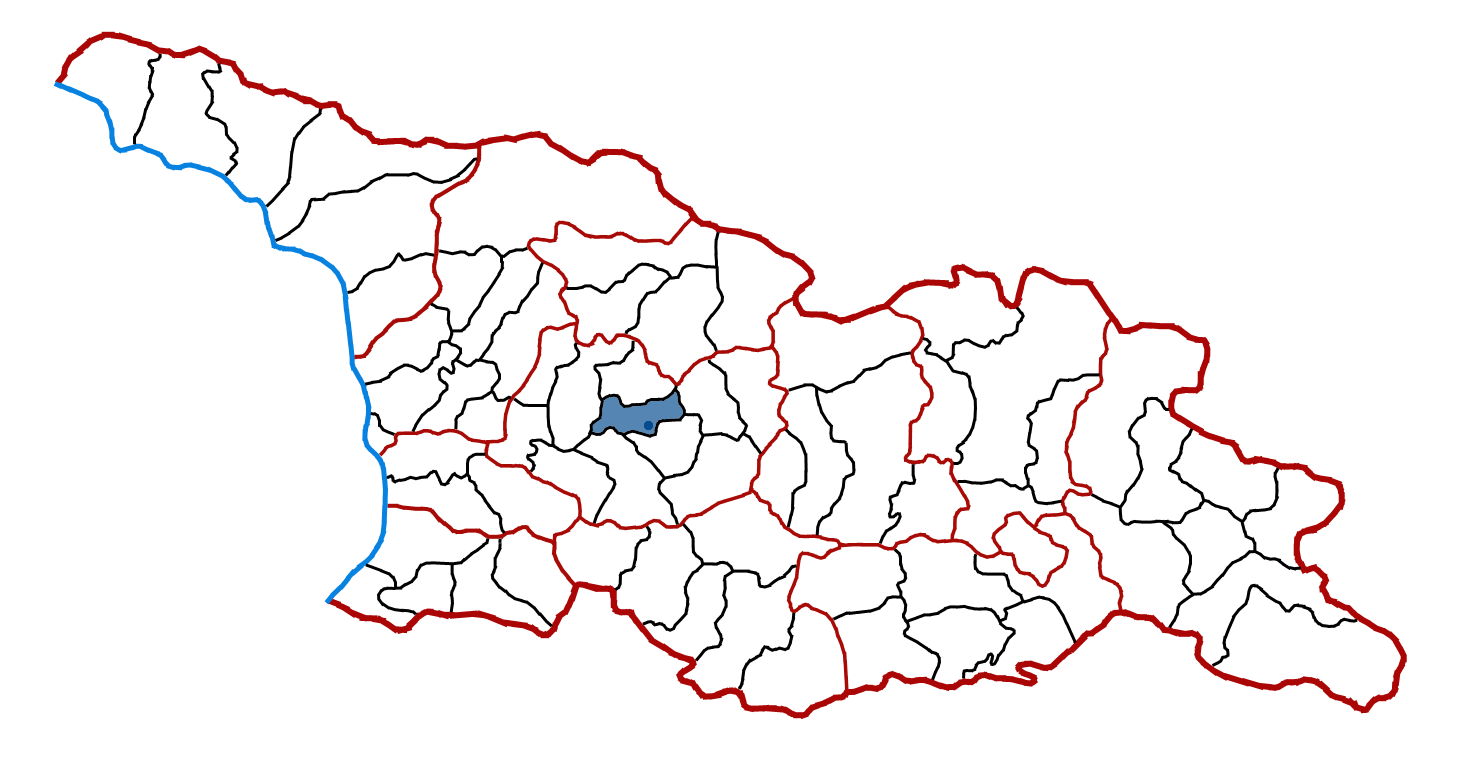
- Location of the municipality within Georgia
- Country: Georgia
- Region: Imereti
- Capital: Terjola

Government
  - Type: Mayor–Council
  - Body: Terjola City Assembly
  - Mayor: Manuchar Robakidze (GD)

Area
  - Total: 357 km^{2} (138 sq mi)

Population (2014)
  - Total: 35,563
  - Density: 99.61/km^{2} (258.0/sq mi)

Population by ethnicity
  - Georgians: 99,7 %
  - Russians: 0,2 %
  - Others: 0,2 %
- Time zone: UTC+4 (Georgian Standard Time)

Terjola (Georgian: თერჯოლის მუნიციპალიტეტი) is a district of Georgia, in the region of Imereti. Its main town is Terjola.

Population: 35,563 (2014 census)

Area: 357 km^{2}

== Politics ==
Terjola Municipal Assembly (Georgian: თერჯოლის საკრებულო, Terjolis Sakrebulo) is a representative body in Terjola Municipality, consisting of 30 members and elected every four years. The last election was held in October 2021.

Party	2017	2021	Current Municipal Assembly
Georgian Dream	29	17	
United National Movement	1	8	
European Georgia	4	3	
For Georgia		1	
People's Power		1 (Note: Split from Georgian Dream.)	
Alliance of Patriots	1		
Total	35	30	

== Gallery ==
Tskaltsitela river

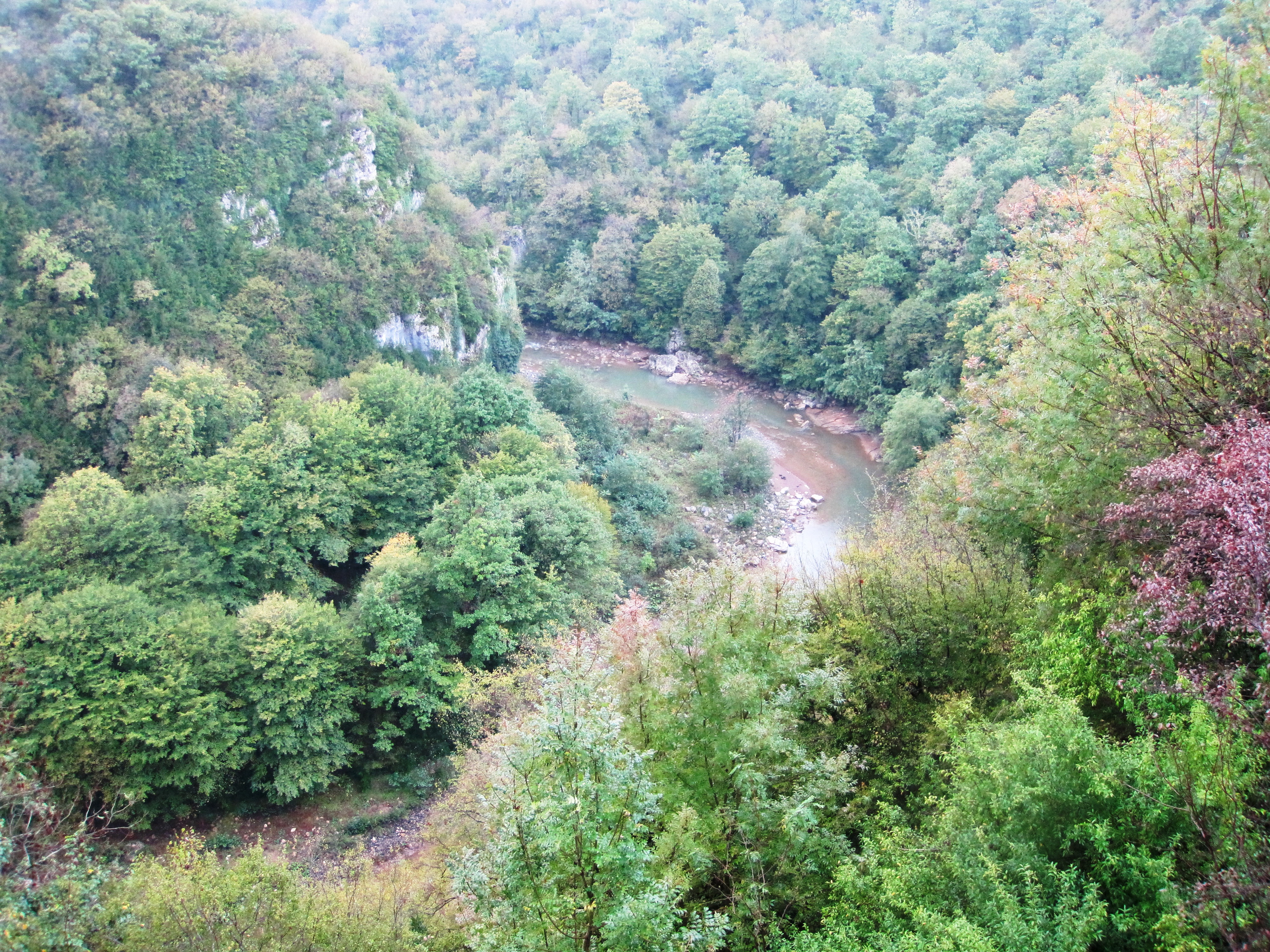
Tskaltsitela river

== See also ==
- List of municipalities in Georgia (country)
