= Kinchkha Waterfall Natural Monument =

- Okatse Waterfall
- IUCN category III (natural monument or feature)
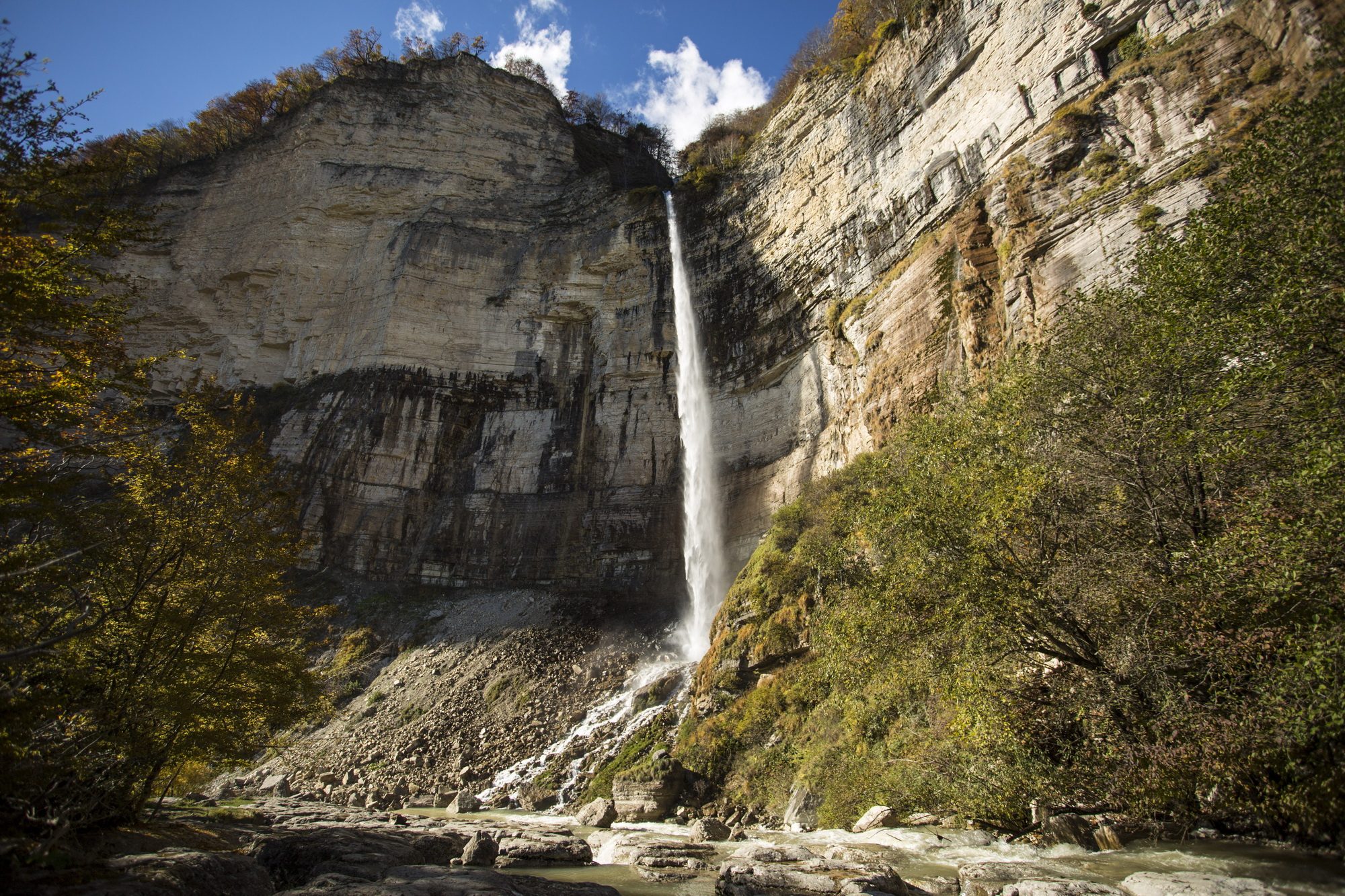
- Main Kinchkha Waterfall with 70 meter height drop.

- Location within Georgia Location within Imereti
- Nearest city: Khoni
- Coordinates: 42°29′44.3″N 42°33′01.9″E
- Area: 0.53 km^{2} (0.20 sq mi)
- Established: 2007
- Governing body: Agency of Protected Areas
- Website: Okatse Waterfall

Kinchkha Waterfall Natural Monument (Georgian: კინჩხის ჩანჩქერი) is a cascade waterfall in Khoni Municipality, Imereti region of Georgia near village Kinchkha in the river gorge of Okatse (Satsikvilo) at 843 meters above sea level. Kinchkha Waterfall has three steps in the chalkstone slopes: the upper step with 25m height drop, the main waterfall with 70 meter height drop and the third one with 20 meters high drop, which has additional water supply from the small streams. The main waterfall created huge siphons in a flatland. It is possible to visit Kinchka waterfall and nearby Lomina waterfall by marked trails, however typical tourist infrastructure is not arranged.

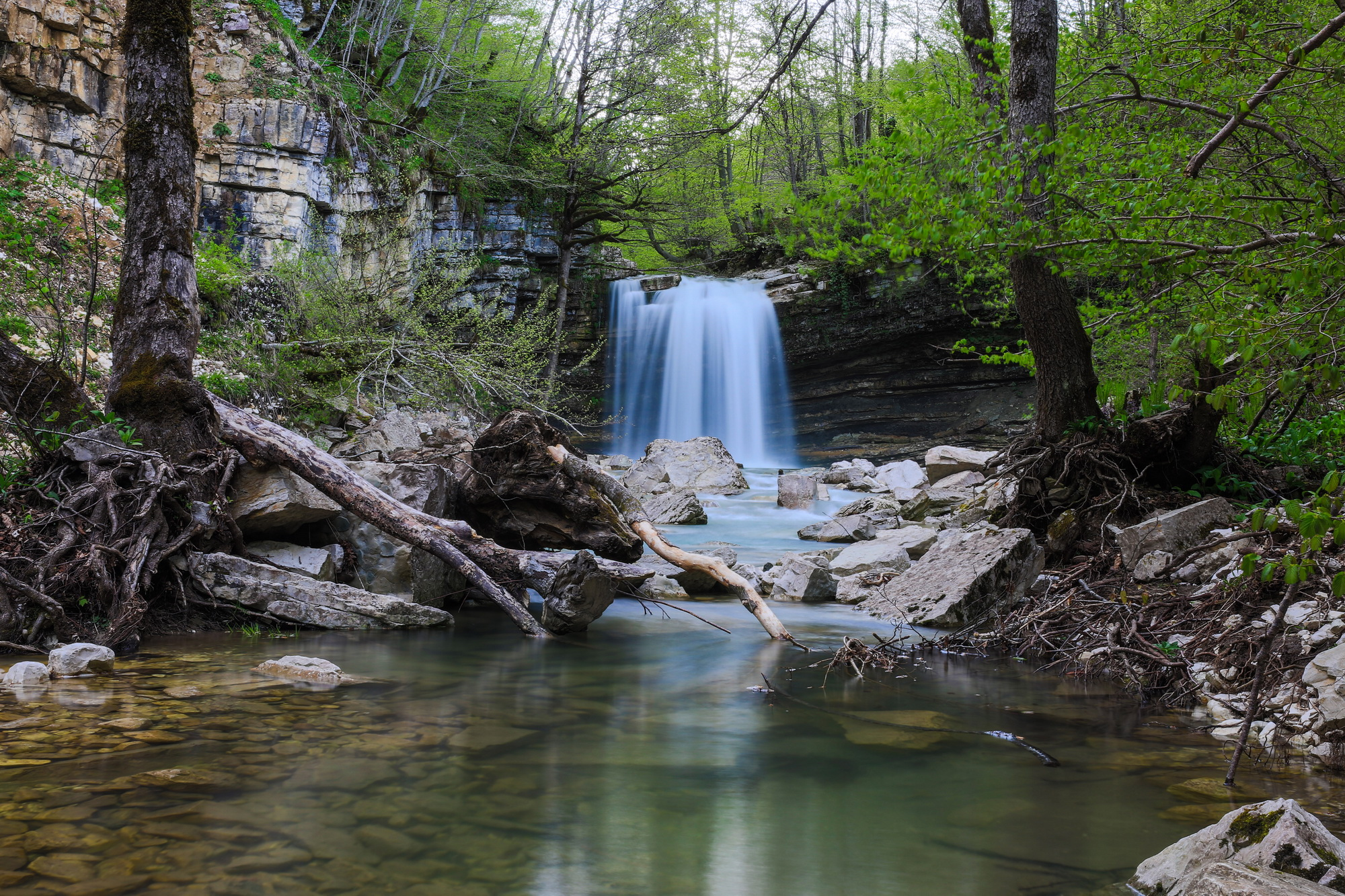
Kinchkha cascade waterfall.

== See also ==
- Okatse Canyon Natural Monument
