= Tagu Meburishvili =

Georgian poet

Tagu Meburishvili (Georgian: ტაგუ ვარდენის ძე მებურიშვილი; 28 August 1934, Pereta, Vani Municipality – 10 April 2007, Tbilisi) was a Georgian poet.

In 1957 Meburishvili graduated from the Georgian Language and Literature Faculty of the Kutaisi Pedagogical Institute. His first poem was published in 1956; in 1966 he issued his first poetry collection, "The Sun Rises Up". Besides his poetic works, he busied himself with the business of translation, editing, and was actively working in the field of children's poetry. His works have been translated into Russian, Armenian and Tatar.
