= Shota Dzidziguri =

- Born: 15 August 1911; Matkhoji, Khoni Municipality, Georgia
- Died: 14 December 1994 (aged 83); Tbilisi, Georgia
- Education: Tbilisi State University
- Scientific career
- Fields: Linguistics

Shota Dzidziguri (Georgian: შოთა ძიძიგური; August 15, 1911, Matkhoji – December 14, 1994) was a Georgian linguist mainly focused on Georgian language and its dialects, basque researcher, PhD in philology, a member and Meritorious Artist of Georgian SSR Academy of Sciences (since 1974). His numerous publications concern the grammar and history of Georgian language, dialectal lexicography, onomastics, literary criticism etc. He supported the hypothesis of a genetic relationship of the Basque and Georgian language.

== Bibliography ==
- Basques and Georgians, Tbilisi, 1982
- The Georgian Language (Short Review), 1969
- Life of the word, Tbilisi, 1988
