= Sulori =

Sulori სულორი
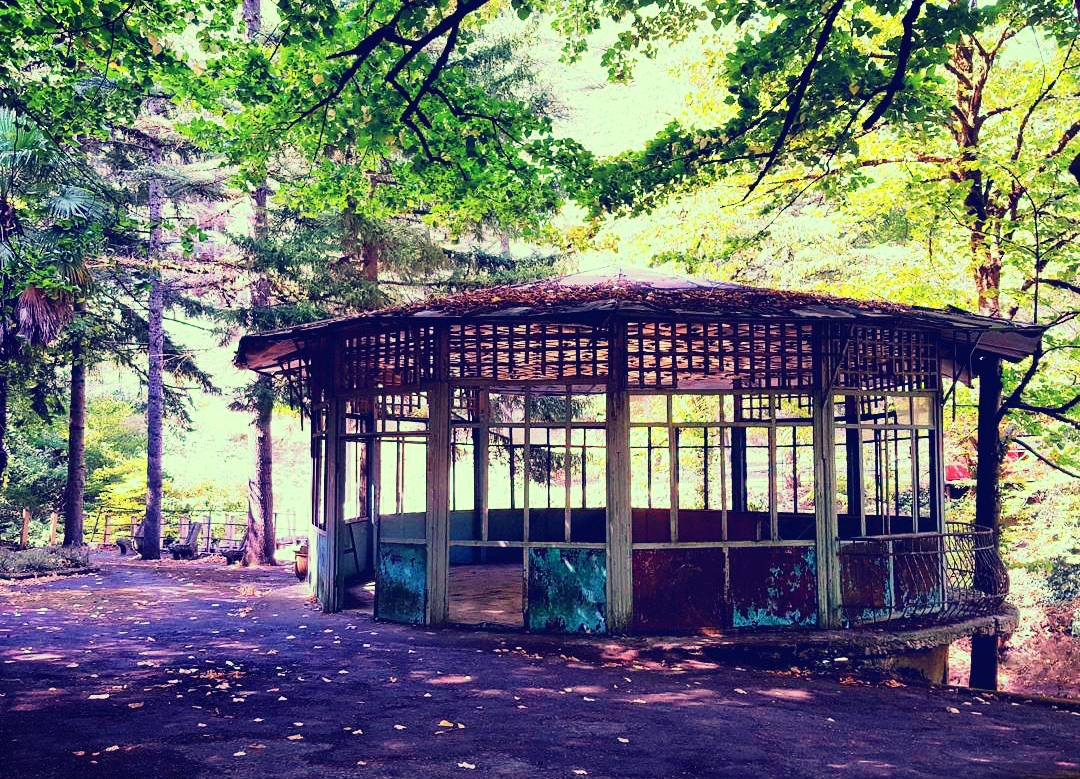
- Soviet time Cafe in Sulori

- Location within Georgia Location within Imereti
- Coordinates: 42°01′28″N 42°34′16″E
- Country: Georgia
- Mkhare: Imereti
- Municipality: Vani Municipality
- Elevation: 250 m (820 ft)

Population (2014)
  - Total: 702
- Time zone: UTC+4 (Georgian Time)
- Climate: Cfa

Sulori (Georgian: სულორი) (formerly the Dvalishvili community) - a village in Georgia, in the municipality of Vani, Imereti region. Community Center. It is located on the banks of the Sulori River (left tributary of the Rioni River). 250 meters above sea level. 11 kilometers from Vani.

== Resort ==
Sulori is a climate-balneological resort of local importance. The climate is humid subtropical with mild snowless winters (average January 5 °C) and hot summers (average August 23 °C). Precipitation 1600 mm per year. The treatment in the resort is based on low-sulfur, sulfate-hydrocarbonated sodium mineral water (temperature 35 °C), which is used for baths for the treatment of locomotor system, peripheral nervous system and gynaecological diseases. Season lasts from June to October.
