= Okatse Canyon Natural Monument =

- IUCN category III (natural monument or feature)
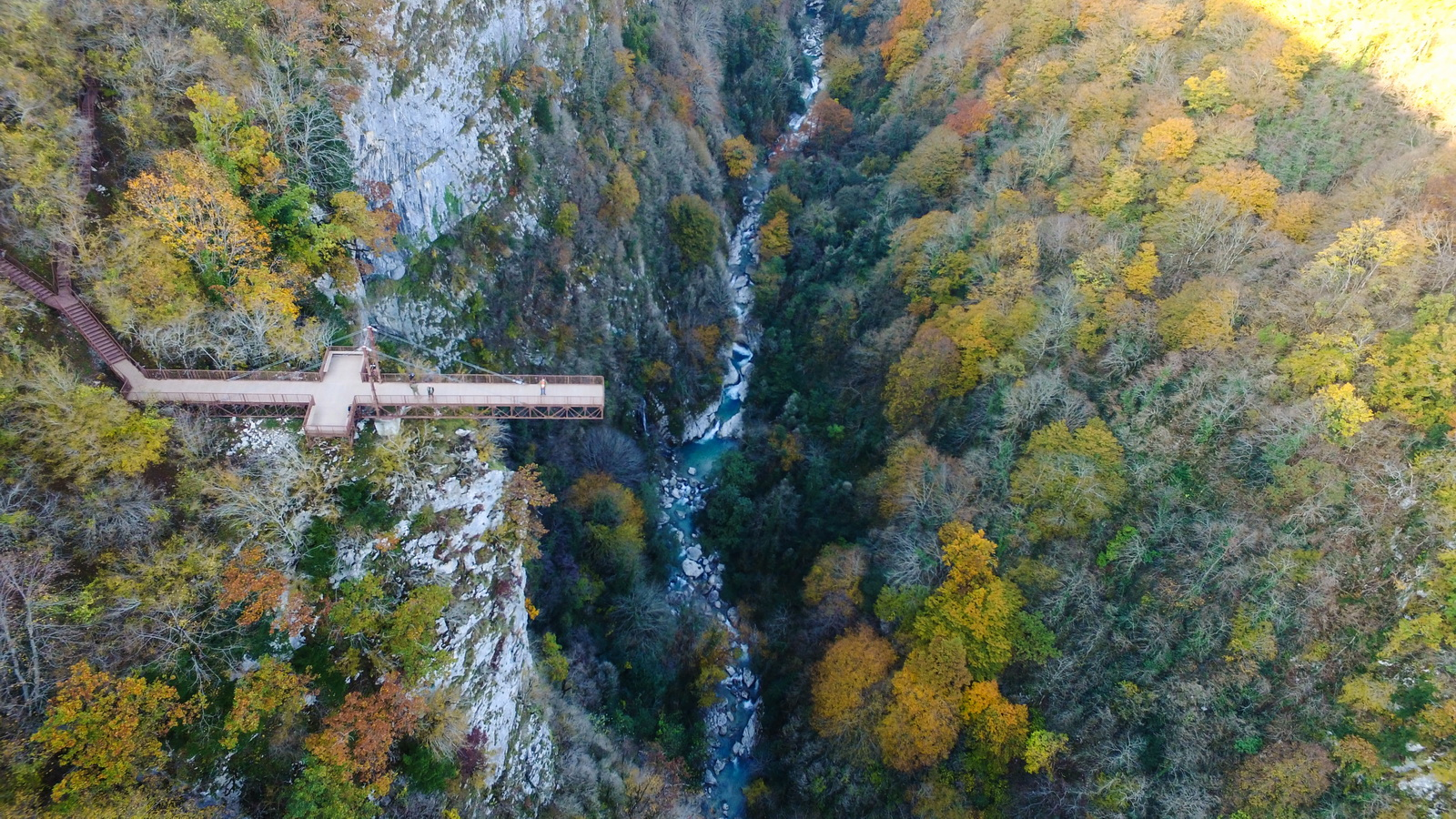
- Okatse Canyon Natural Monument

- Location within Georgia Location within Imereti
- Nearest city: Khoni
- Coordinates: 42°27′04.7″N 42°33′00.2″E
- Area: 1.35 km^{2} (0.52 sq mi)
- Established: 2007
- Governing body: Agency of Protected Areas
- Website: Okatse Canyon

Okatse Canyon Natural Monument (Georgian: ოკაცეს კანიონი [okʼatsʰes kʼanioni]) is an Okatse river erosion canyon located in Khoni Municipality, Imereti region of Georgia near village Zeda Gordi at 520 meters above sea level.

== Morphology ==
Okatse Canyon Natural Monument is a 2 kilometers segment of a 14 kilometers long Okatse River. Erosion of river valley created a 3–6 meters wide canyon, in some places 15–20 meters wide. The canyon depth varies from 20 to 100 meters. Canyon has several waterfalls including Kinchkha Waterfall Natural Monument and several tiny lakes, one of them, Oskapo is 60 meters long. In some places the canyon walls almost merge and produce natural caverns, one of them named Boga, from which the canyon bottom can be seen. Below Boga, the depth of the canyon rises to 100 meters. Geologists identified here a tectonic plume rising from the Earth's crust. Therefore the lower part of the river valley is elevated by several tens of meters compared to the middle section of the valley. The valley was blocked by a tectonic fracture and a Gordian lake was formed in which clay-sand was deposited. Along the canyon there are several caves from which the karst waters flows into the Okatse River.

== Flora ==
Canyon valley vegetation benefit from steady water supply and canyon's peculiar microclimate some pretty big trees has grown on it sloping banks, including rare and endangered timber specimens. River valley is covered with forest bushes. Pre-historic flora has been studied by analyzing sediments of canyon's Gordian lake, which are 27 meters or more thick. Gordian lake sediments from Pleistocene epoch have clear evidences of seasonal precipitation, as each year has pair of corresponding layers. Palynological study revealed remains of archaic, now extinct in this region species of flora including Swamp cypress, Taxodium, Engelhardia, Careya and Tsuga. In the higher layers of the Gordian Lake sediments, traces of these plants was not found, reflecting the climate-induced orogenesis.

== Tourist attractions ==
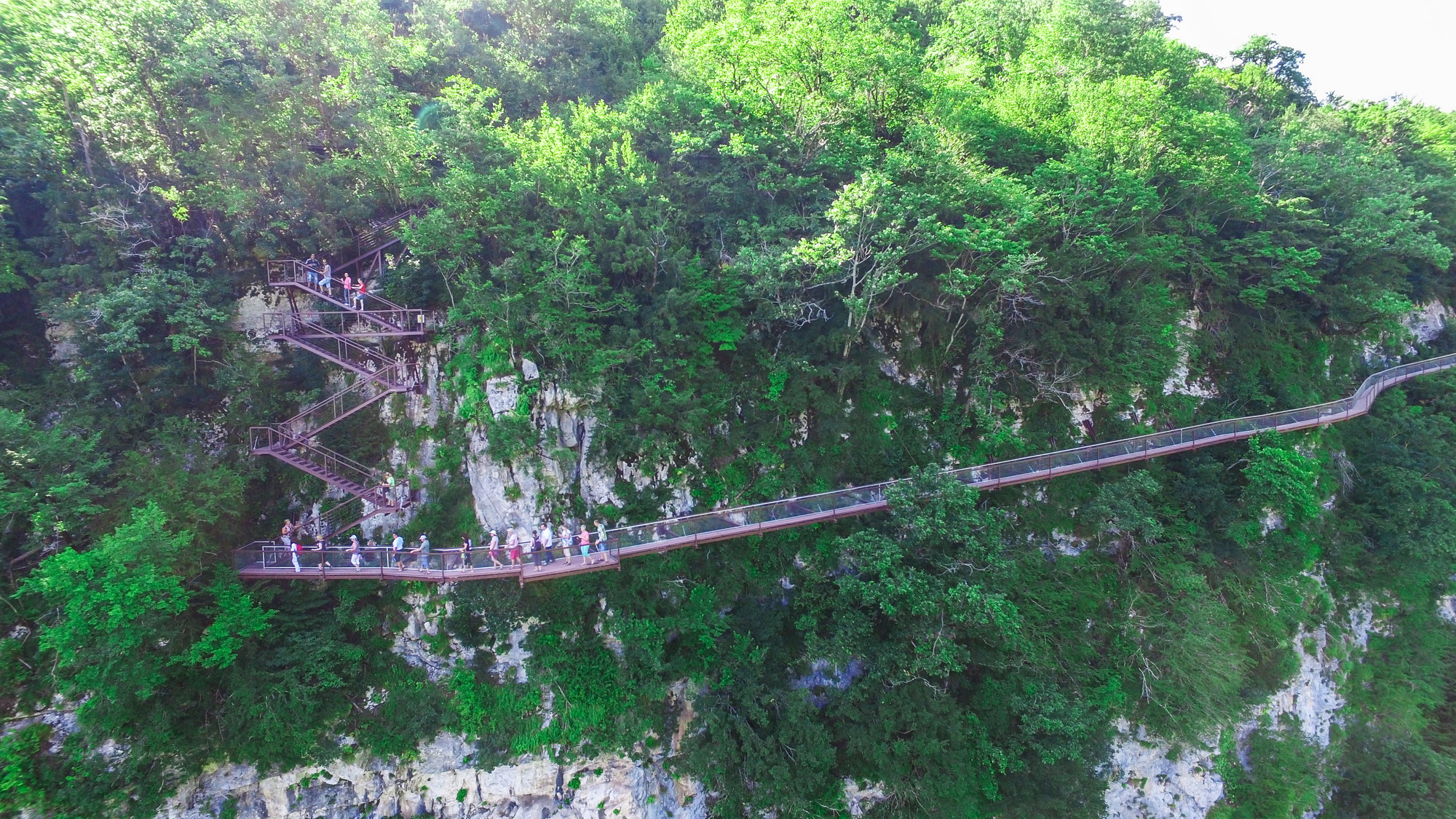
Pedestrian passageway at Okatse Canyon.

From Okatse Canyon visitor center in Gordi village a 6 km long pedestrian passageway starts with 2300 m long stone paved section in Dadiani historical forest and leads to the Okatse Canyon checkpoint where the 780 m long hanging cliff trail starts. From here one way ends with the 20m long platform, hanging above canyon and providing panoramic view. This is visitors favorite spot for bird watching and taking selfies. The second 645m long stone paved path with 989 steps of metal stairs smoothly leads to the Okatse river and to the canyon bottom. Here the width of the canyon is not more than 4 meters, while the depth is 50 meters. It is also possible to get from the visitor center to the canyon checkpoint by car or bicycle. Visitors center offers café, souvenirs shop, lockers and parking lot. Okatse Canyon with Kinchkha Waterfall Natural Monument being main attraction there are also Dadiani forest park and ruins of Dadiani castle.

== See also ==
- Kinchkha Waterfall Natural Monument
