= Sukhumi stela =

Ancient Greek art

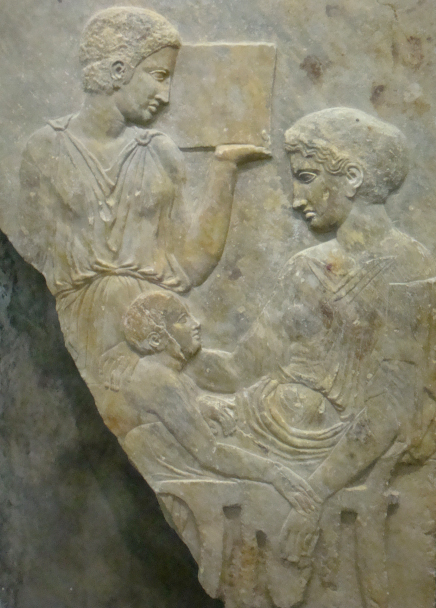
Sokhumi stela

The Sokhumi stela is a piece of ancient Greek art, a marble gravestone (stela) depicting a woman and two children, found in 1953 underwater in the Black Sea near Sukhumi in Abkhazia/Georgia. It is now on display at the Sukhumi State Museum.

== Description ==
The monument is a marble slab of rectangular shape, 157 cm long, 92 cm wide and 11-12 cm thick. The grayish-spotted color of the marble, not found locally, suggests the stone was exported from the outside to a Greek colony in Colchis, on the territory of modern-day Sukhumi, possibly Dioscurias. It was found underwater, at the mouth of the small river Basla/Besleti, in 1953 and studied in detail by Mikhail Trapsh and Otar Lordkipanidze. The monument, dated by Lordkipanidze to the period of 430–420 BC, stands out for its artistic qualities among the marble bas-reliefs from ancient Greek cities of that period.

The front side of the tombstone features three sculptured human figures, apparently in a scene of bidding farewell to a dead woman. The woman, seated in an armchair, hugs with her right hand a grieving boy leaning against her knees. The background depicts a young girl in a girdled (belted) Attic peplos holding a small box, probably with funeral gifts to the dead person.
