= Vani =

Vani ვანი
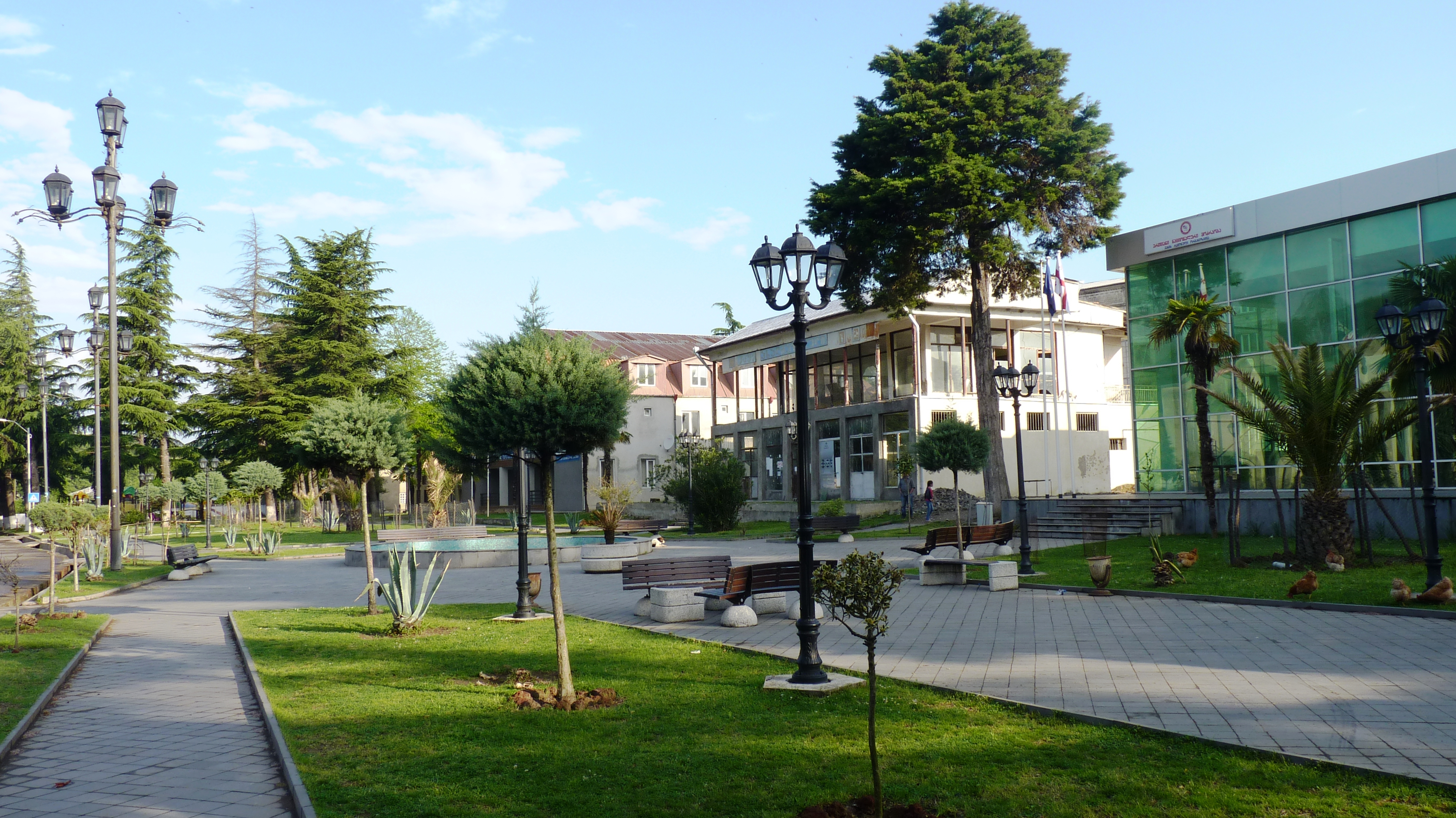
- Tavisupleba street
- Interactive map of Vani
- Location within Georgia Location within Imereti
- Coordinates: 42°05′02.18″N 42°30′43.01″E
- Country: Georgia
- Mkhare: Imereti
- Municipality: Vani
- Elevation: 60 m (200 ft)

Population (2024)
  - Total: 3,209
- Time zone: UTC+4 (Georgian Time)
- Climate: Cfa
- Website: vani.org.ge

Vani (Georgian: ვანი [vän̪i]) is a town in Imereti region of western Georgia, at the Sulori river (a tributary of the Rioni river), 41 km southwest from the regional capital Kutaisi. The town, with a population of 3,744 as of 2014, is an administrative center of the Municipality of Vani comprising also 40 neighbouring villages (with a total area of 557 km^{2} and a population of 24,512 as of 2014).

== Archaeology ==
Systematic archaeological studies (by Nino Khoshtaria and Otar Lordkipanidze) carried out in the Vani environs since 1947 revealed the remnants of a rich city of the ancient power of Colchis. The name of this ancient settlement is still unknown but four distinct stages of uninterrupted occupation have been identified. The first phase is dated to the 8th to 7th centuries BC. In this period Vani is presumed to have been a major cultic centre. The second phase - end of the 7th and beginning of the 6th to the first half of the 4th century BC - is represented by cultural layers, remains of wooden structures, sacrificial altars cut in the rocky ground, and rich burials. It is assumed that on this stage Vani was the centre of a political-administrative unit of the kingdom of Colchis. The third phase covers the second half of the 4th to the first half of the 3rd century BC. It is represented largely by rich burials, remains of stone structures. To the fourth phase (3rd to mid-1st centuries BC) belong defensive walls, the so-called small gate, sanctuaries and cultic buildings (temples, altars sacrificial platforms), and the remains of a foundry for casting bronze statues. It is assumed that in the 3rd to 1st centuries BC Vani was a temple-city. According to the archaeological data, the city was destroyed in the mid-1st century BC. Subsequently, Vani declined to a village and was officially granted a status of a town only in 1981.

In the town, there is a museum (founded in 1985), where some unique pieces of the ancient Colchis are exhibited.

Artifacts from Vani in Simon Janashia Museum of Georgia

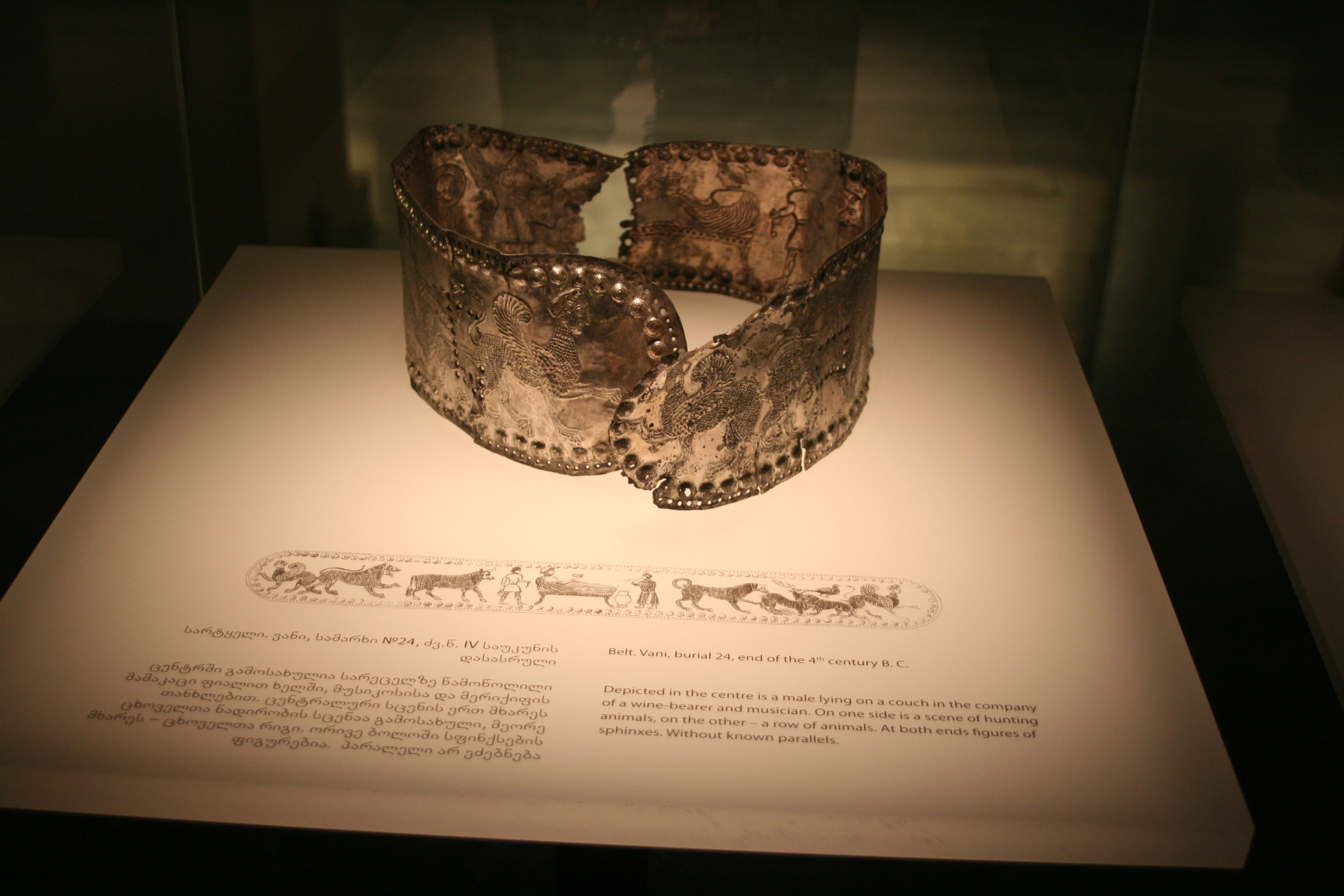
Belt. End of the 4th century B.C.

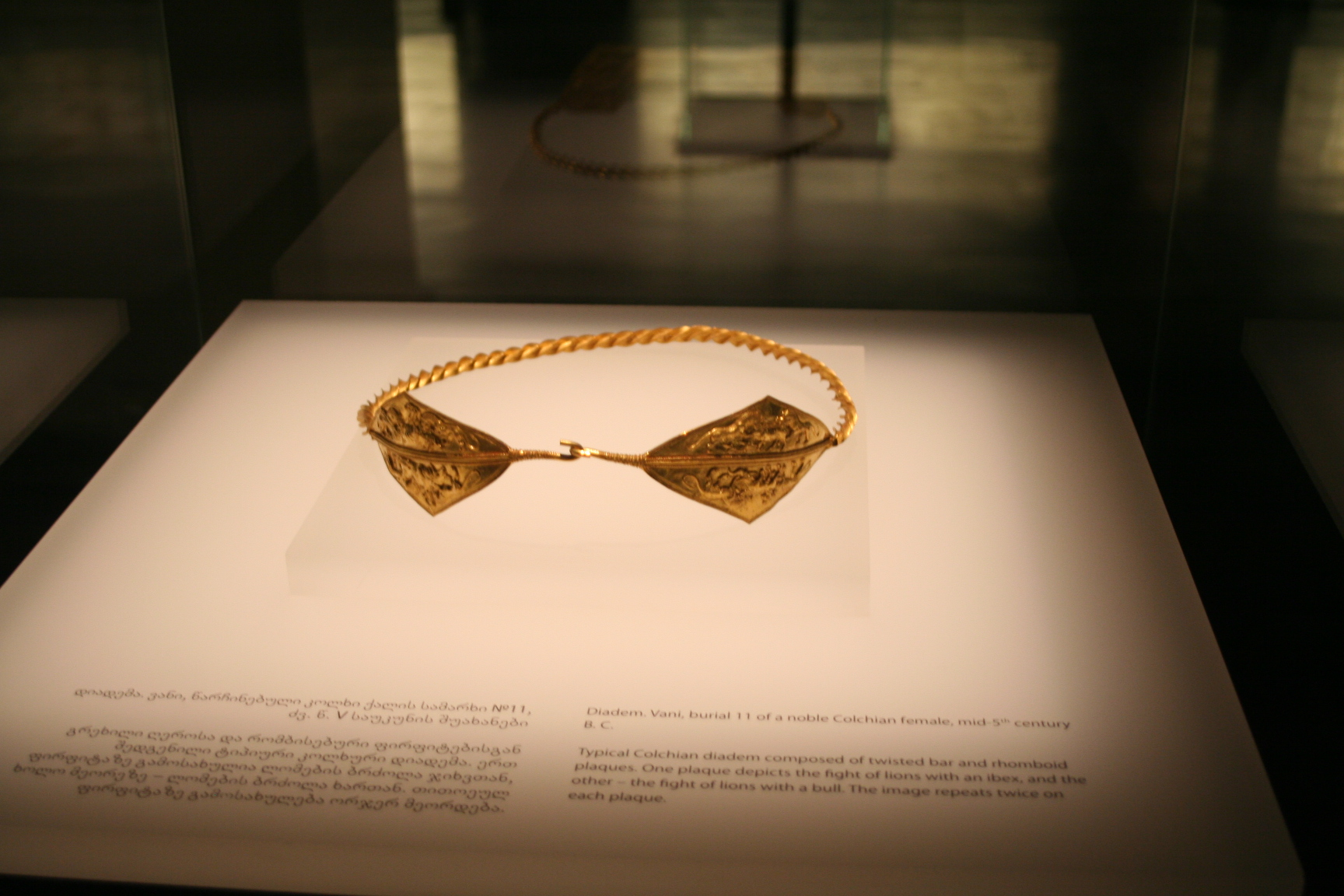
Diadem of a noble Colchian female. Mid 5th century B.C.

== International relations ==
=== Twin towns — sister cities ===
- Fallon, Nevada, United States
- Ashkelon, Israel – From 1990
- Prosser, Washington, United States – From 2010
- Amvrosiivka, Ukraine – From 2011

== See also ==
- Imereti
- Vani Archaeological Site

== Bibliography ==
- Lordkipanidze O., "Vani, An Ancient City of Colchis." Greek, Roman and Byzantine Studies. 32(2): 151–195, 16 plates. Durham, USA, 1991.
