= Victor Zagainov =

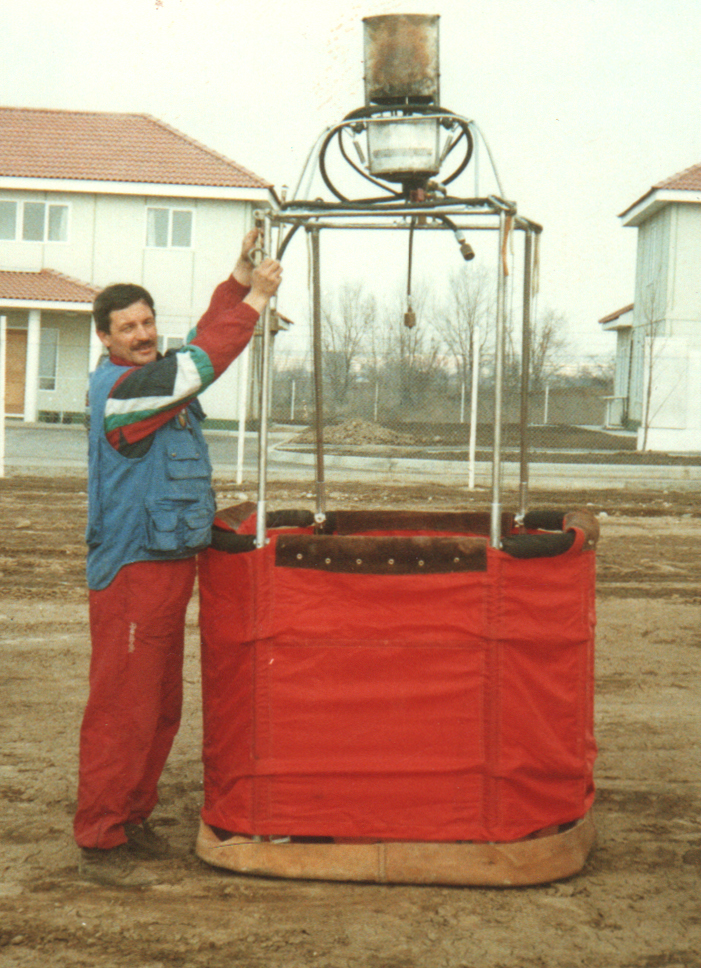
- Victor Zagainov assembling his super light Hot Air Balloon basket
- Born: Victor Alexandrovich Zagainov (Russian: Виктор Александрович Загайнов); May 31, 1953; Tsulukidze, Georgian Soviet Socialist Republic
- Died: October 5, 2002 (aged 49); Zheleznovodsk, Russia
- Occupation(s): Hot air balloon pilot, astronomer, teacher

Victor Zagainov (May 31, 1953 – October 5, 2002) was a hot air balloon pilot and astronomer from Kazakhstan. He was the first and only hot air balloon champion of the USSR (1991), Hot Air Balloon champion of the Republic of Kazakhstan (1993), the winner of the International Balloon Grand Prix Todi (Italy) (1993), the champion of the CIS (1996). He organized Grand Prix of Zagainov and was awarded Fédération Aéronautique Internationale (FAI) Diploma for Outstanding Airmanship (Award ID# 5349) and the FAI Air Sport Medal (Award ID# 5244) in 2003.

== Early years ==
Victor Zagainov was born in the family of a military pilot Alexander Zagainov in Tsulukidze (now Khoni) of the Georgian Soviet Socialist Republic, where at that time the military unit of his father was based. His father retired in Luhansk (former Voroshilovgrad), Ukraine where Victor grew up. From his early years, Victor had two passions, both related to the sky - he wanted to fly like his father, and he was in love with the stars. However, due to partial colour blindness Victor was not accepted to the flight school. Therefore, stars became his main obsession and future profession.

From the 7th grade, he spent much time in Luhansk Pedagogical Institute, where there was a small telescope. He did many observations and read a lot. He was a winner of the Republican Astronomy Olympiad in grade 9th and 10th. He graduated school in Luhansk and entered Odesa University in 1971 with Astronomy major.

After graduation he worked as an astronomer at the limited access observatory in Uzbekistan and later in Kazakhstan near Alma-Ata (now Almaty). In 1980, Victor decided to settle in Kazakhstan.

== Teaching of astronomy ==
For several years (1983–1990) Mr. Zagainov led a club of amateur astronomers at the National Palace of Pioneers of the Republic of Kazakhstan. Among his students are well-known physicists, mathematicians, journalists working in Almaty, Russia and abroad. Many of them repeatedly flew with Victor on his legendary balloon "Altair". For many of them he was not only a teacher but also a father. His heart and home were always open to them. Even after 13 years of not running the club they came to him for advice.

== Hot air ballooning ==
In 1989, Victor was first introduced to ballooning - long cherished dream of a flight in the sky. In 1990 he had built his first hot air balloon. The envelope was made in Feodosiya, the burner was done by well-known designer D. Bimbat in Sverdlovsk and the basket he weaved himself. The name and design of the balloon reflected his two passions (astronomy and flights). A proudly soaring eagle and the inscription "Altair" (which in Arabic means "The flying eagle") - the name of Alpha Aquilae.

The first inflation of "Altair" happened in December 1990 in Sverdlovsk. In February 1991 he flew this balloon in Norway. Then in August 1991 it was in Ukraine. In September 1991 Victor Zagainov on the Hot Air Balloon "Altair" become the first champion of the USSR. In the same year the Soviet Union collapsed, so Victor Zagainov was the only one to receive this title. His astronomy club students were not only his first passengers, but also members of his crew. Three out of the four members of his crew at the National Championship of USSR in 1991 were his former students.

=== Grand Prix of Zagainov ===
Victor was one of the biggest promoters of Hot Air Ballooning. As part of this work in his new home country Kazakhstan he organized Hot Air Balloon competition - Grand Prix of Zagainov. For the first time it took place in 1992. Such event offered opportunity for novice pilots to improve their skills, while introducing international standards to them. To help Kazakh pilots improve their level, Victor invited pilots from Pakistan, France, Switzerland, England, Scotland, Germany, United States, Ukraine and Russia. Main goal of Grand Prix of Zagainov was to rise new generation of pilots.

As part of Grand Prix of Zagainov in 1996 Victor organized national records setting flight for Hot Air Balloons of different classes. This was a first time any Hot Air Balloon record registration request was submitted to FAI.

== Final flight ==
On October 3, 2002, taking part in a ballooning event in the town of Zheleznovodsk (Russia), Victor Zagainov's balloon was involved in a mid-air collision between his balloon's envelope and a descending balloon's basket. Victor's envelope was torn open at a height of 300 m (980 ft), initiating a very fast and uncontrolled descent. Despite his best efforts to keep the balloon inflated with continuous heating, the envelope caught fire, deflated and the balloon plunged to the ground.

On board with Victor, as the only passenger, was his best friend's and crew-member's 19-year-old daughter. Realizing that he could not stop or slow the balloon's descent, just before impact Victor lifted the girl in his arms and placed himself underneath her, thus acting as a living cushion on impact. Both occupants survived the crash and the girl was released from hospital after a routine check, with just a few scratches and concussion. Victor Zagainov succumbed to severe internal injuries two days later.
