= Vani Municipality =

Coordinates: 42°05′N 42°30′E

Vani Municipality ვანის მუნიციპალიტეტი
- Municipality
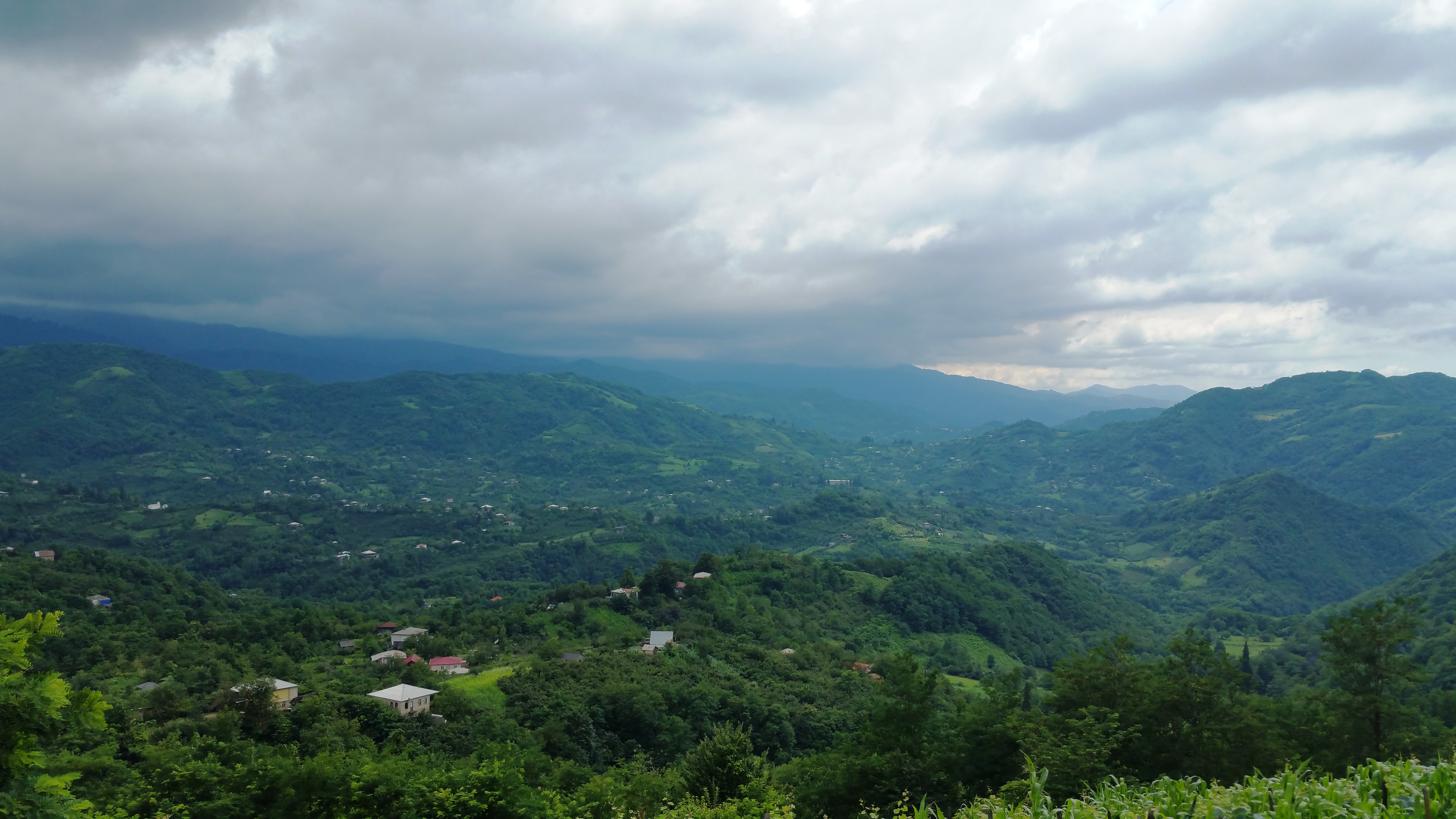
- View from Ukhuti

- Flag Seal

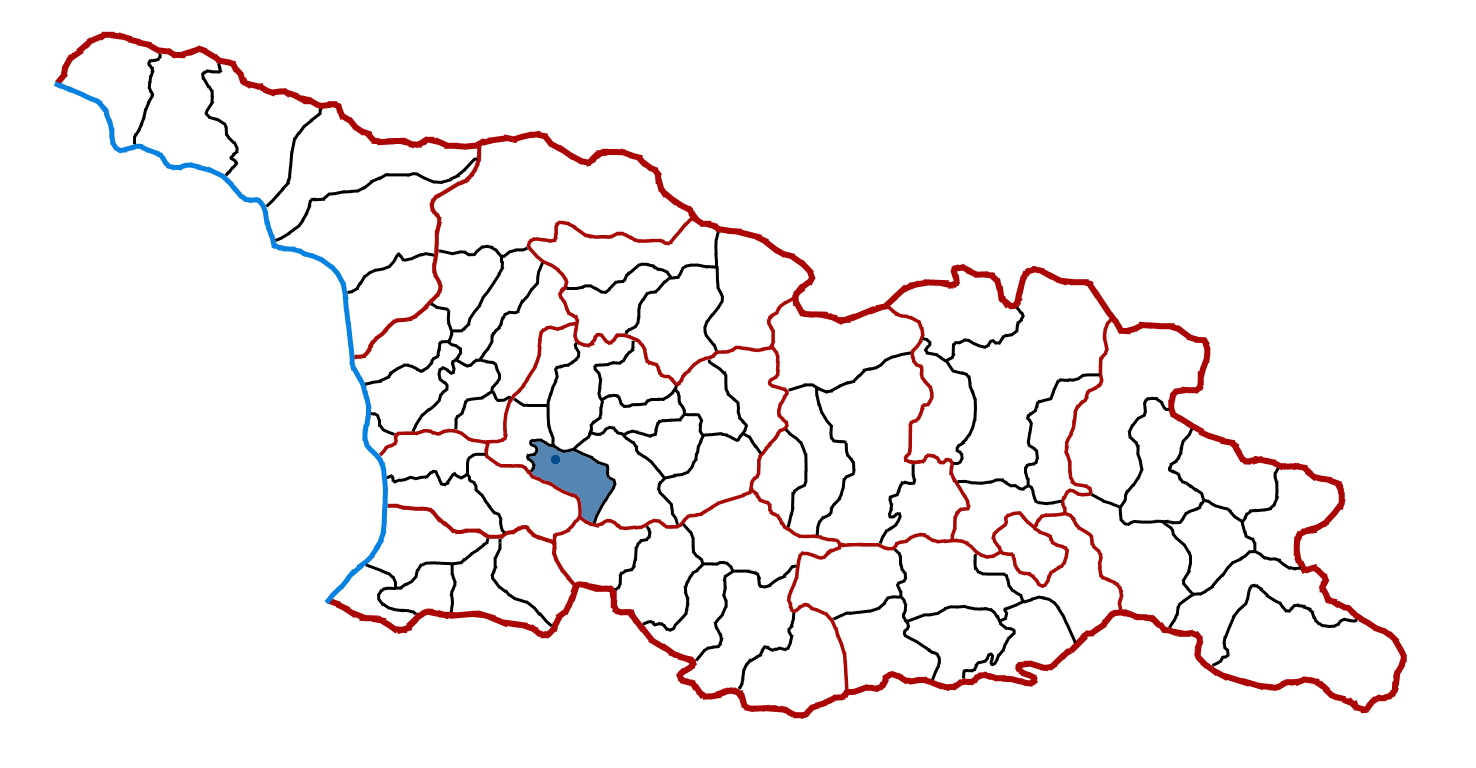
- Location of the municipality within Georgia
- Country: Georgia
- Region: imereti
- Capital: Vani

Government
  - Type: Mayor–Council
  - Body: Vani Municipal Assembly
  - mayor: Alexander Gogorishvili (Georgian Dream)

Area
  - Total: 557 km^{2} (215 sq mi)
- Elevation: 1,500 m (4,900 ft)

Population (2014)
  - Total: 24 512
  - Density: 44/km^{2} (110/sq mi)

Population by ethnicity
  - Georgians: 99.8 %
  - Russians: 0.1 %
  - Others: 0.1 %
- Time zone: UTC+4 (Georgian Standard Time)
- Website: vani.gov.ge

Vani (Georgian: ვანის მუნიციპალიტეტი) is a municipality of Georgia, in the region of Imereti. Its main town is Vani.

== Geography ==
In 1930, it was separated into a separate district. Located in the extreme southwestern part of Imereti. The municipality is bordered by Baghdati, Samtredia, Tskaltubo, Adigeni and Chokhatauri municipalities. The main units of relief are the northern slopes of the Meskheti Range, the Imereti lowlands and the hilly foothills of the transitional southern Imereti. The northern part is occupied by the Imereti plain. The Rioni River runs north of the municipality. Rivers flow in the territory of Van: Sulori, Kumuri and others. The rivers have their headwaters on the northern slope of the Meskheti Range, 1,500 m (4,900 ft) above sea level.

== Economy ==
The leading sector of the economy is agriculture. The lands occupy 16.2 ha (40 acres). The main vine varieties are: Tsolikouri, Tsitska and Aladasturi. Horticulture is also developed. The wealth of the main minerals are construction materials: andesite, basalt, alabaster (Inashauri), ceramic clay, limestone (Isriti), mineral waters (Inashauri, Sulori, Chokiani), thermal waters (Amagleba, Sulori). The main transport hub of the municipality is the city of Vani, which is connected by roads to the cities of Kutaisi, Baghdati, Samtredia and Lanchkhuti. The city is connected to the main railways of the Caucasus from Kutaisi and Samtredia. Tourism is also very important for the Vani economy.

== Politics ==
Vani Municipal Assembly (Georgian: ვანის საკრებულო) is a representative body in Vani Municipality. currently consisting of 30 members. The council assembles into session regularly, to consider subject matters such as code changes, utilities, taxes, city budget, oversight of city government and more. Vani sakrebulo is elected every four year. The last election was held in October 2021.

Party	2017	2021	Current Municipal Assembly
Georgian Dream	30	23	
United National Movement	2	6	
European Georgia	3	1	
Total	35	30	

== Historical sites ==
There are balneological resorts on the territory of the municipality: "Sulori" and "Amagleba", which is famous for its thermal and mineral waters. There are historical monuments on the territory of Vani: St. George Church in Shuamta; Melouri Fortress and XIV c. Melouri Church in the village. 12th– to 13th-century Church of the Archangel; Tamar Fortress in the village. In Inashauri; Bzvani Cave; Gormaghali fortress in the village. In Sulor; Epiphany Church in the village. In Shuamta; 18th-century Trinity Church in the village. In Dikhashkho; XI Church in the village. XVI church in the village. In Salomina; Two castles of the feudal era and a church from the 19th century in the village. In the upper part; 1619 Church of the Savior in the village. In raising; Medieval castle, church and tower in the village. In the arrow; Archangel Church in the village. In the lower extremity; The castle village of Maisaour; According to the legend, there is a cross erected on the territory of Vani municipality by Andrew the First-Called.

== Tourist attractions ==
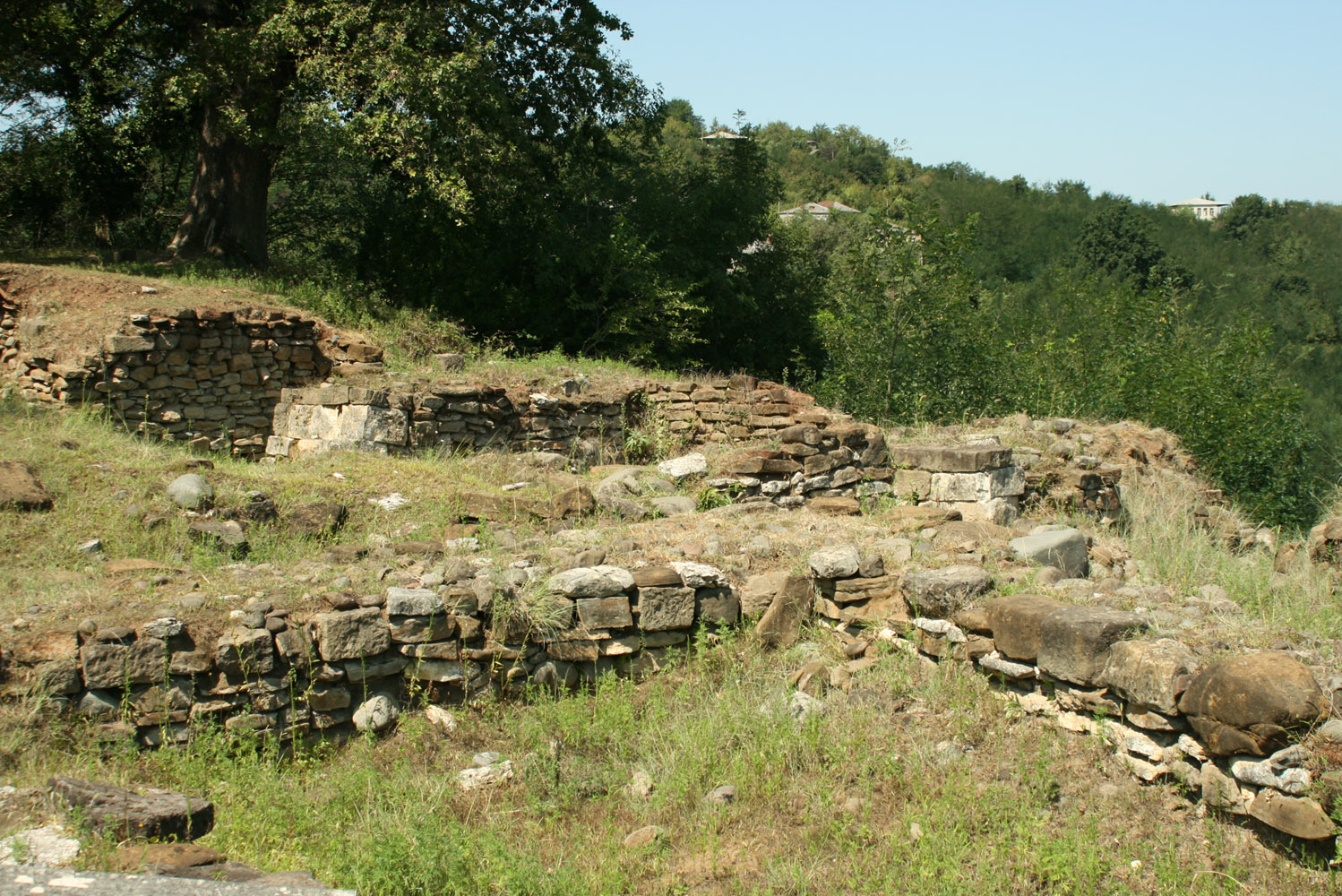
Ruins of ancient settlement

The most famous tourist site is Otar Lortkipanidze Vani Archaeological Museum-Reserve. Its complete rehabilitation will be completed in 2019, making the Van Museum the best in the Transcaucasian region. The Archaeological Museum will house restoration and foundation departments, a children's education center, a library, and exhibition and conference halls equipped with modern technologies. The museum preserves the excavated archeological materials, presents architecture, goldsmithing, bronze sculptures. All the exhibits of the world-famous exhibition "Golden Colchis" have been excavated in the ancient city of Van, most of which will be returned to the museum. The components of the museum-reserve complex are the city of Vani. also historically and economically significant is Vani archaeological site

== Administrative divisions ==
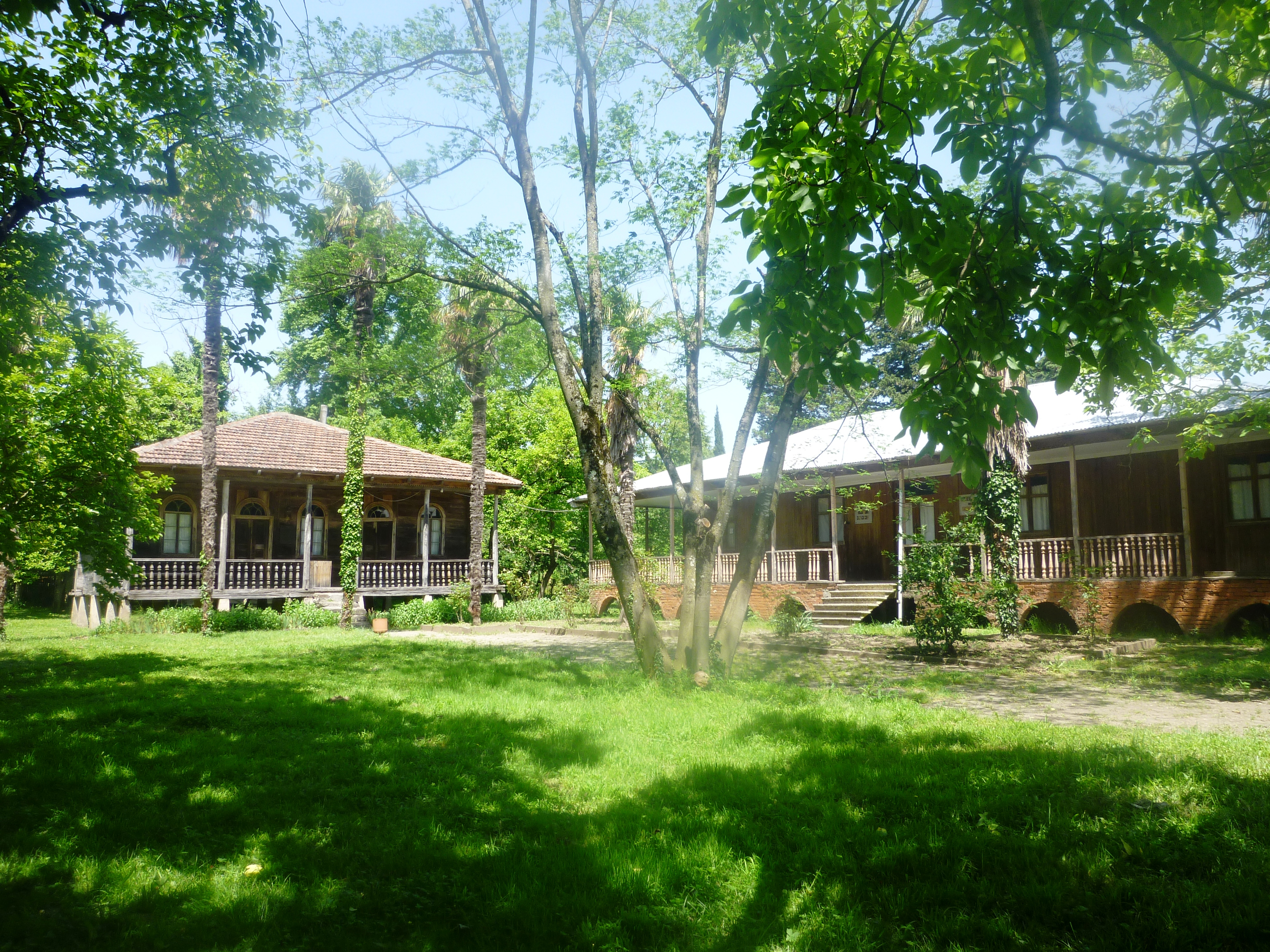
View of Titsian Tabidze Home

There are 21 administrative units in Vani municipality: Vani, Shuamta, Mukedi, Tsikhesulori, Dikhashkho, Gadidi, Gora, Tobanieri, Amagleba, Mtisdziri, Fereta, Salominao, Salkhino, Saprasia, Sulori, Ukhuti, Kumuri, Zedavani, Zeindari, Dzulukhi and Bzvani.

== Settlements ==
Rank	Settlement	Population
1	Vani	3,744
2	Sulori	702
3	Chkvishi	376

== See also ==
- List of municipalities in Georgia (country)
