= Khoni =

Coordinates: 42°19′28″N 42°25′20″E

Khoni ხონი
- Town
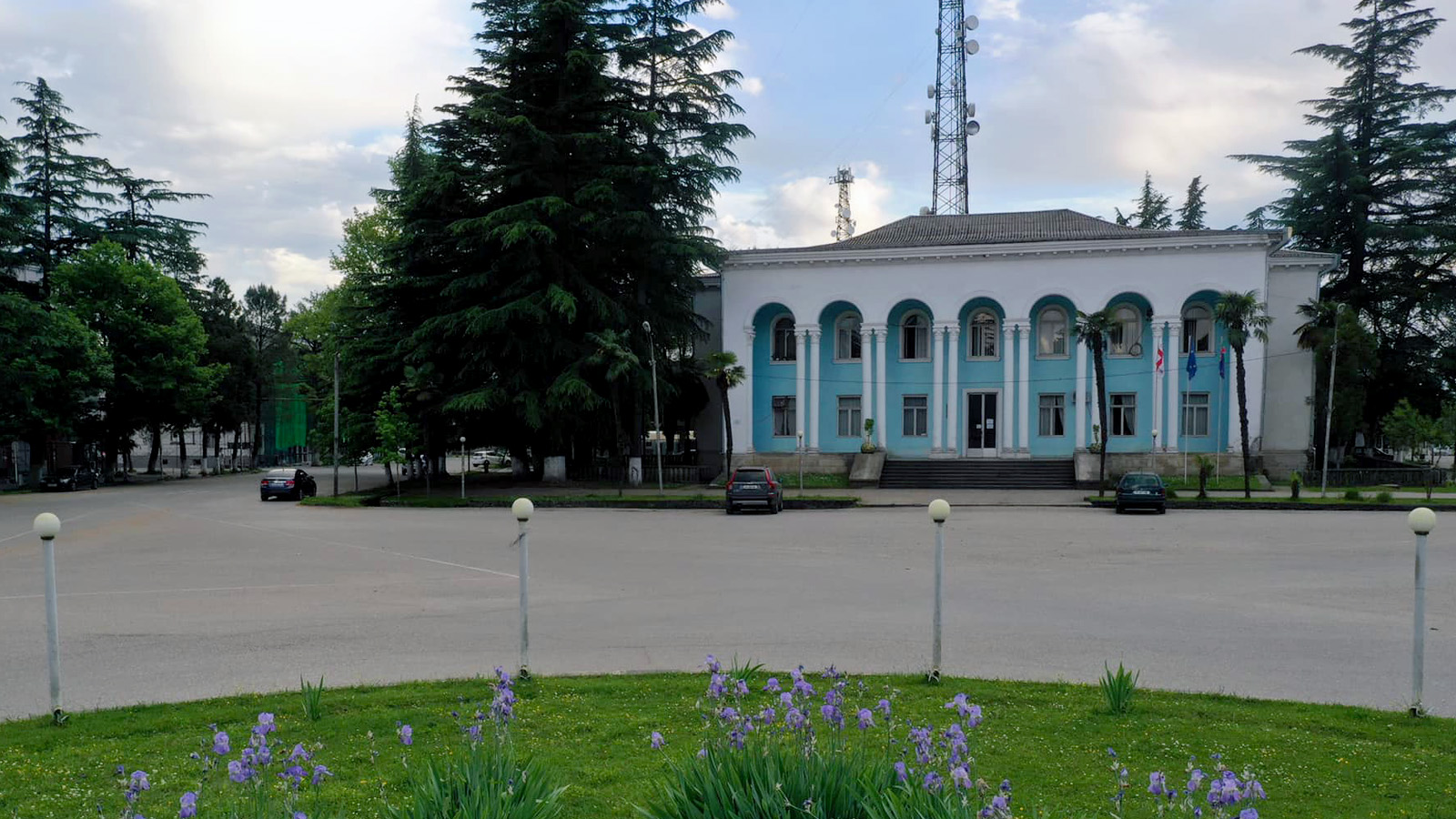
- Khoni Town Hall
- Interactive map of Khoni
- Country: Georgia
- Region: Imereti
- District: Khoni
- Elevation: 114 m (374 ft)

Population (January 1, 2024)
  - Total: 7,756
- Time zone: UTC+4 (Georgian Time)
- Area code: +995 495

Khoni (Georgian: ხონი [χo̞n̪i]) is a town in the Western Georgian region (mkhare) of Imereti with a population of 7,756 as of January 2024. It is situated on the left bank of the Tskhenistsqali River in the north-west of Imereti, close to the border with the region of Samegrelo-Zemo Svaneti and 266 km west of Georgia's capital Tbilisi. The town serves as an administrative centre of the Khoni District. Its economy is based on agriculture, particularly tea production.

Khoni has been known as a lively trading locale and a see of the Georgian Orthodox diocese since the Middle Ages. The town itself was founded in the 6th or 9th century and the still functioning St. George's Cathedral in downtown Khoni was constructed between the 11th and 13th centuries. It acquired the status of a town in 1921. Under the Soviet Union, it was named after the Marxist revolutionary Alexander Tsulukidze in 1936, but the historical name of Khoni was restored in 1991.

== Notable people from Khoni ==
- Akaki Chkhenkeli (1874–1959), Georgian politician and publisher
- Kita Chkhenkeli (1895–1963), Georgian linguist
- Tamar Abakelia (1905–1953), Georgian sculptor
- Irakli Abashidze (1909–1992), Georgian poet and public figure
- Apollon Kutateladze (1900–1972), Georgian painter
- Nana Mchedlidze (1926–2016), Georgian actress, film director and screenwriter
- Ipolite Khvichia (1910–1985), Georgian actor
- Victor Zagainov (1953–2002), astronomer and hot air balloon pilot

== See also ==
- Imereti
