= Khoni Municipality =

Coordinates: 42°19′N 42°26′E

Khoni Municipality ხონის მუნიციპალიტეტი
- Municipality
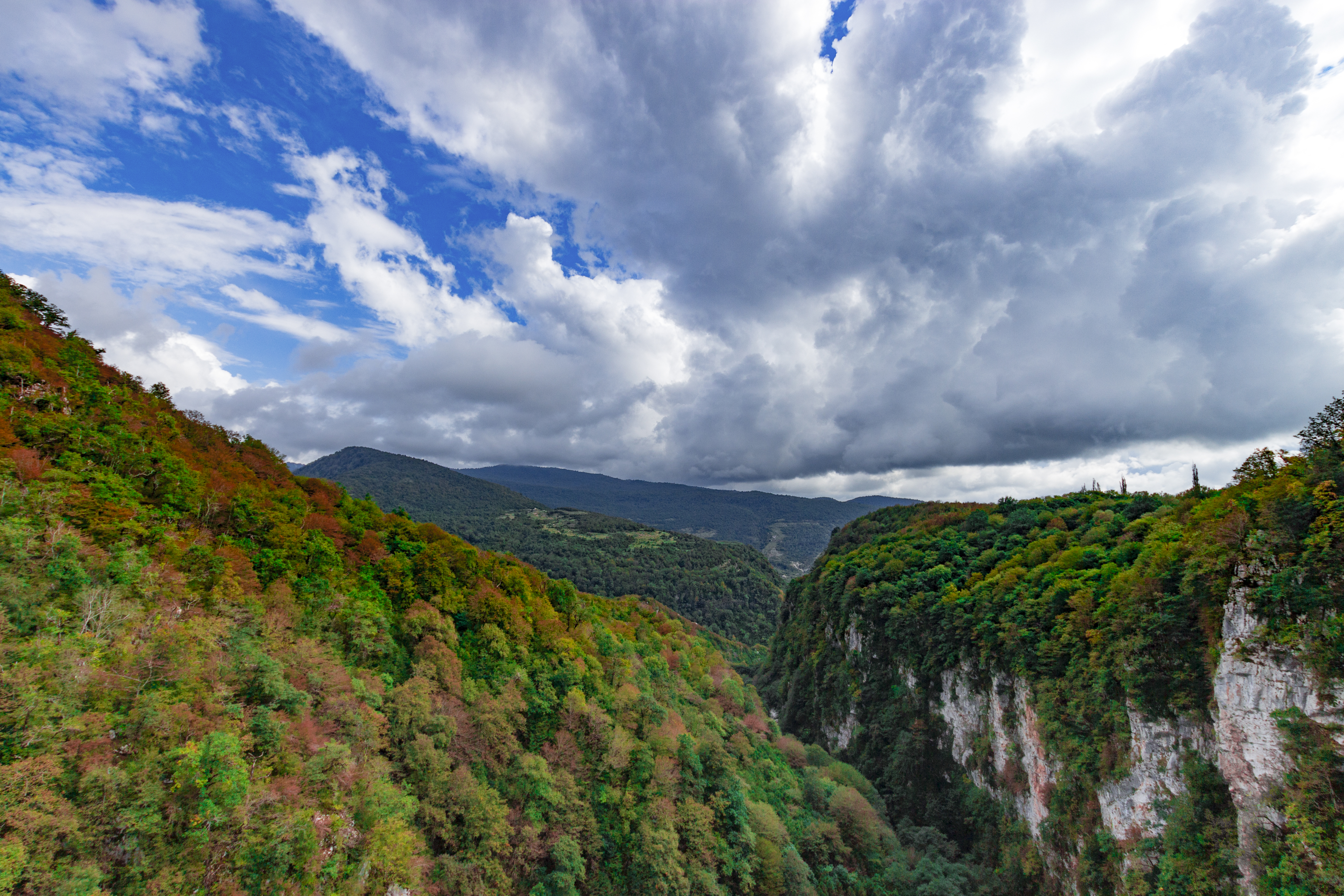
- Okatse Canyon

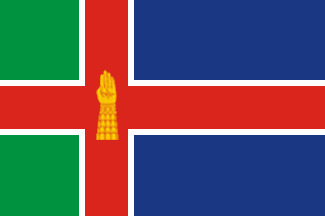
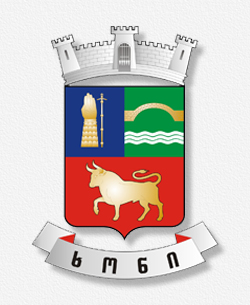
- Flag Seal

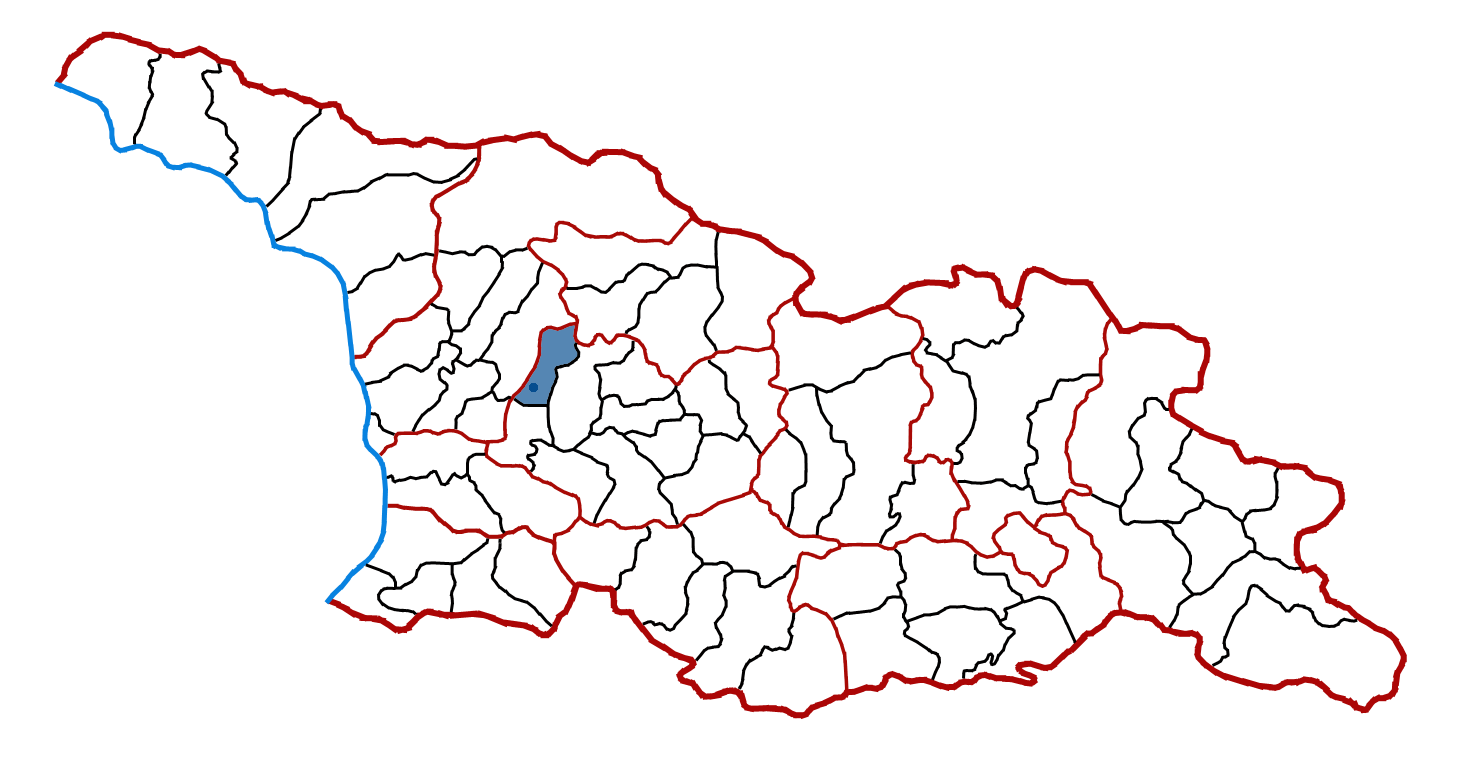
- Location of the municipality within Georgia
- Country: Georgia
- Region: Imereti
- Capital: Khoni

Government
  - Type: Mayor–Council
  - Body: Khoni Municipal Assembly
  - mayor: Lado Jurkhadze (GD)

Area
  - Total: 429 km^{2} (166 sq mi)

Population (2014)
  - Total: 23,570

Population by ethnicity
  - Georgians: 99,7 %
  - Russians: 0,16 %
  - Others: 0,14 %
- Time zone: UTC+4 (Georgian Standard Time)

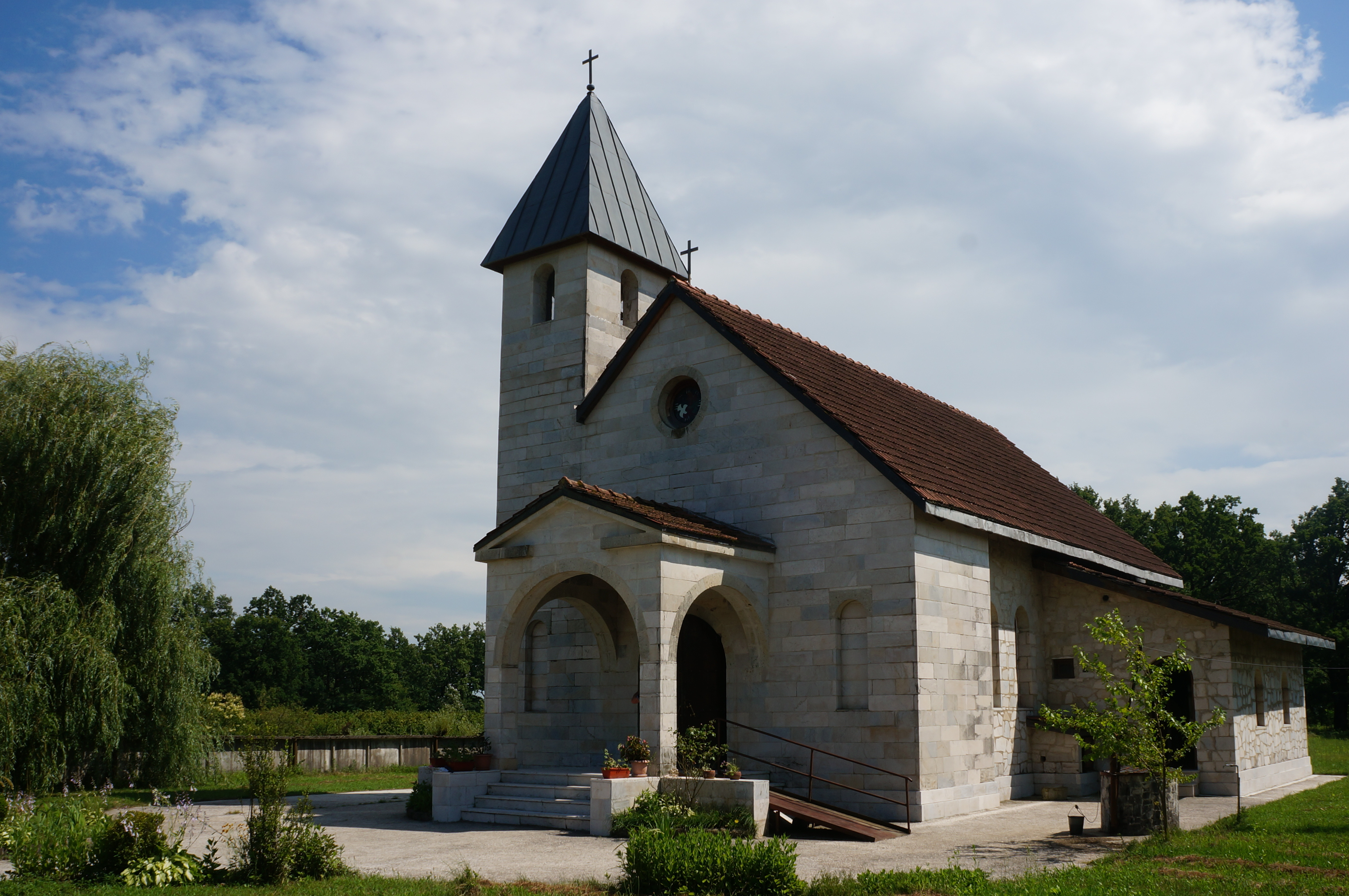
Akhalsheni Village Church

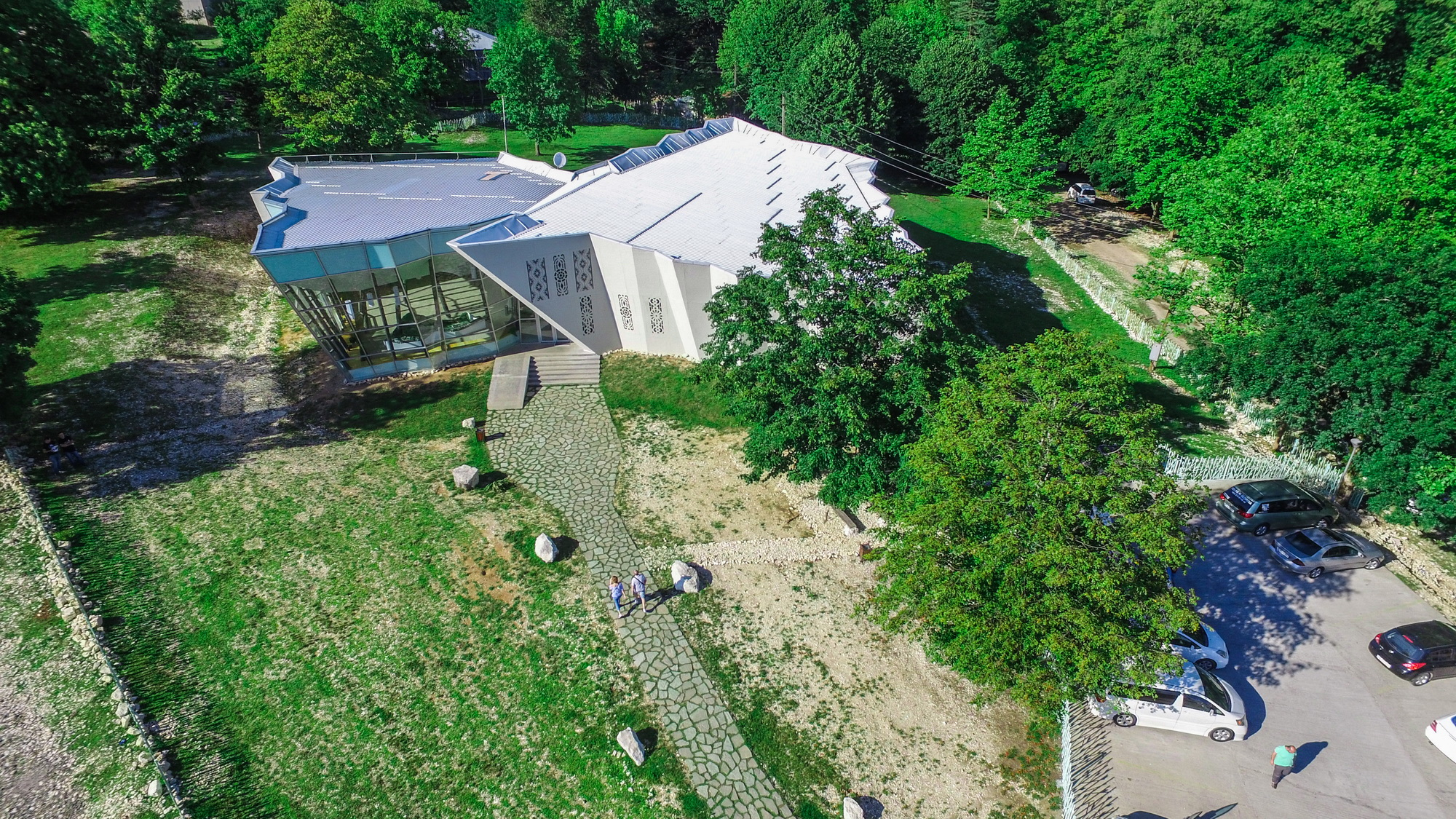
Okatse Tourist centre

Khoni (Georgian: ხონის მუნიციპალიტეტი) is a district of Georgia, in the region of Imereti. Its main town is Khoni.

The territory of Khoni municipality is part of the historical kingdom of Colchis. The origin and development of the Khoni is related to the trade-caravan routes passing through the area. The abutment of "Bumbua Bridge" on the Tskhenistsqali river is preserved to the present day. Here, in 65 BC the Roman commander Pompey passed through and built a lifting bridge.

== History ==
The remains of ancient smeltings are found in Kveda Kinchkha. There is also found a gold money of ancient times, the stater of king Ake (3rd century BC), in Khoni there are 1270 pieces of "Colchian white" coins, Byzantine or Turkish coins. Late Bronze Age hill settlements - "Gorikebi" - are found in Khoni, Little Jikhaishi, Kutiri, Ghvedi. The population still finds various items of bronze fighting, agricultural, cult-ritual purposes and copper ingots. In the first centuries of Christianity the churches of the first martyr were built in: Khoni, Gelaveri, Kveda Kinchkha and Khidi. In the Middle Ages, the territory of the municipality was the property of the King. During the Russian conquest of the kingdom of Imereti and Russian rule, the territory of the municipality was part of Vake Mazra and the Daba Khoni - center of Mazra. Since 1846, this territory merged with Kutaisi Governorate.

== Politics ==
Khoni Municipal Assembly (Georgian: ხონის საკრებულო) is a representative body in Khoni Municipality. currently consisting of 30 members. The council assembles into session regularly, to consider subject matters such as code changes, utilities, taxes, city budget, oversight of city government and more. Khoni sakrebulo is elected every four year. The last election was held in October 2021.

Party	2017	2021	Current Municipal Assembly
Georgian Dream	18	20	
United National Movement	1	5	
European Georgia	8	4	
For Georgia		1	
Independent	1		
Total	28	30	

=== Historical monuments ===
The ancient historical monument which preserved on the territory of Khoni Municipality is BC 65 years old "Bumbua" or Pompey Bridge in the village of Khidi. There are two Early Feudal Age fortresses in the village of Matkhoji. Khoni Church is notable- 8th–9th-century St. George's Church in Khoni. The medieval settlement of Kibula is found in the village of Kveda Kinchkha. Here are the churches of Saviour and St. George, Tareshi Church and burial vault. 17th-century Gvashtibi Fortress and the church in Gvashtibi; Ghvedi Fortress in the village of Ghvedi. In the territory of the village of Kveda Gordi are the 18th-century Rekhi and Veli Fortresses. In the same village there are monuments of the 19th century on the estates belonging to Dadiani: Forest-Park, Kari Church, historical sources.

On the territory of the municipality historical monuments are also preserved in the villages:

- Bangveti - 10th–11th-century church
- Udzlouri - 1319 Church of Saviour
- Akhalsheni - medieval Mukhurisi Fortress
- Sukhcha - medieval Church of the Mother of God
- Nogha - medieval "Ukimerioni" Fortress and Church
- Khidi - late medieval former church of Obuji
- Patara (little) Jikhaishi - 1790 and 1897 St. George and Saviour Churches
- Gelaveri - 18th-century Marine Church
- Matkhoji - 1864 and 1872 St. Basili and St. Nino Churches
- Kutiri - St. George church, 1872
- Khoni - pedagogical seminar, 1881
- Satsulukidzeo - 19th-century former church of Kvirike and Ivlita
- Dzedzileti - Archangel Church

== See also ==
- List of municipalities in Georgia (country)
