= Imereti =

Administrative region of Georgia

Coordinates: 42°10′N 42°59′E

Imereti იმერეთი
- Mkhare (region)
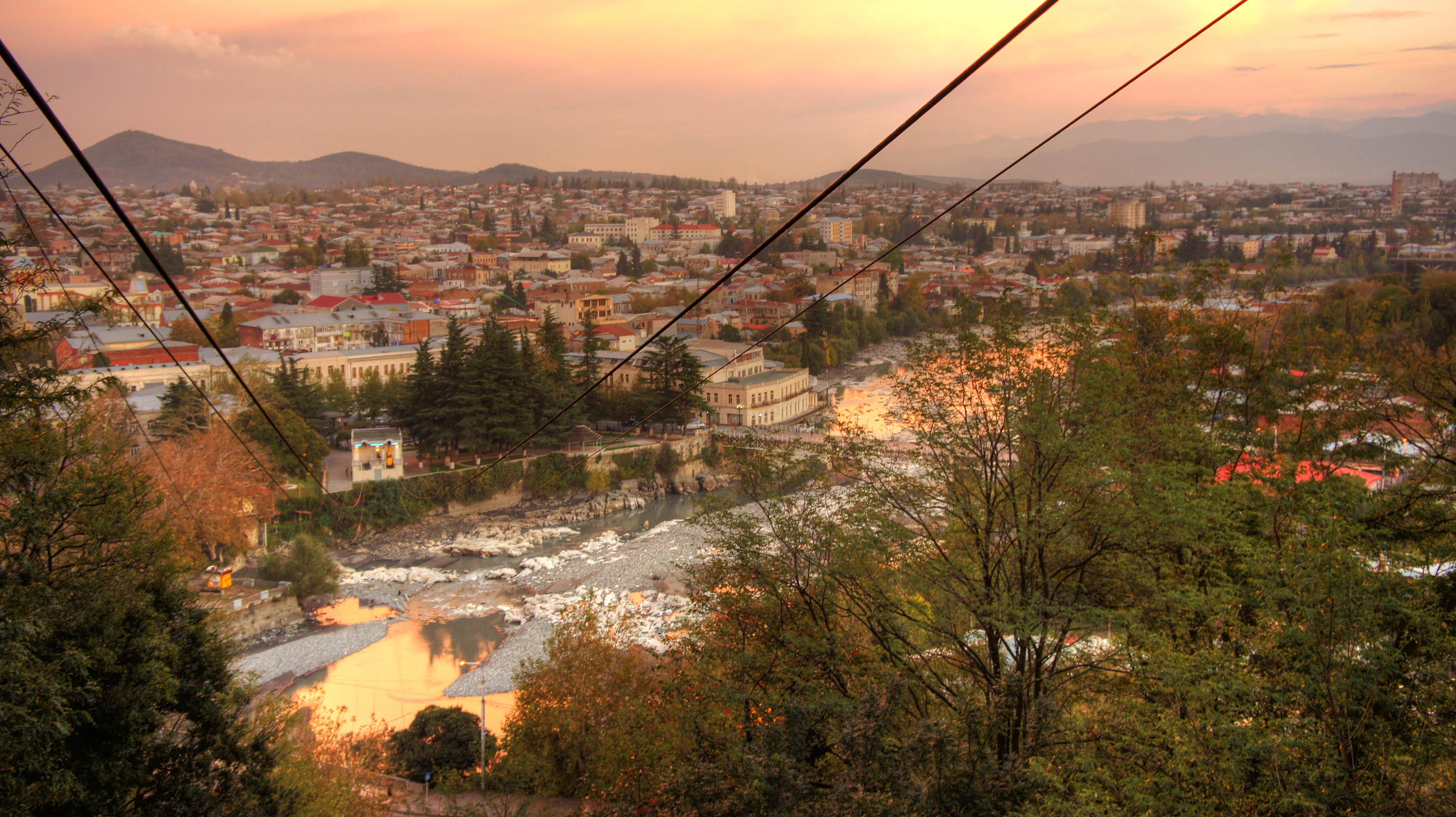
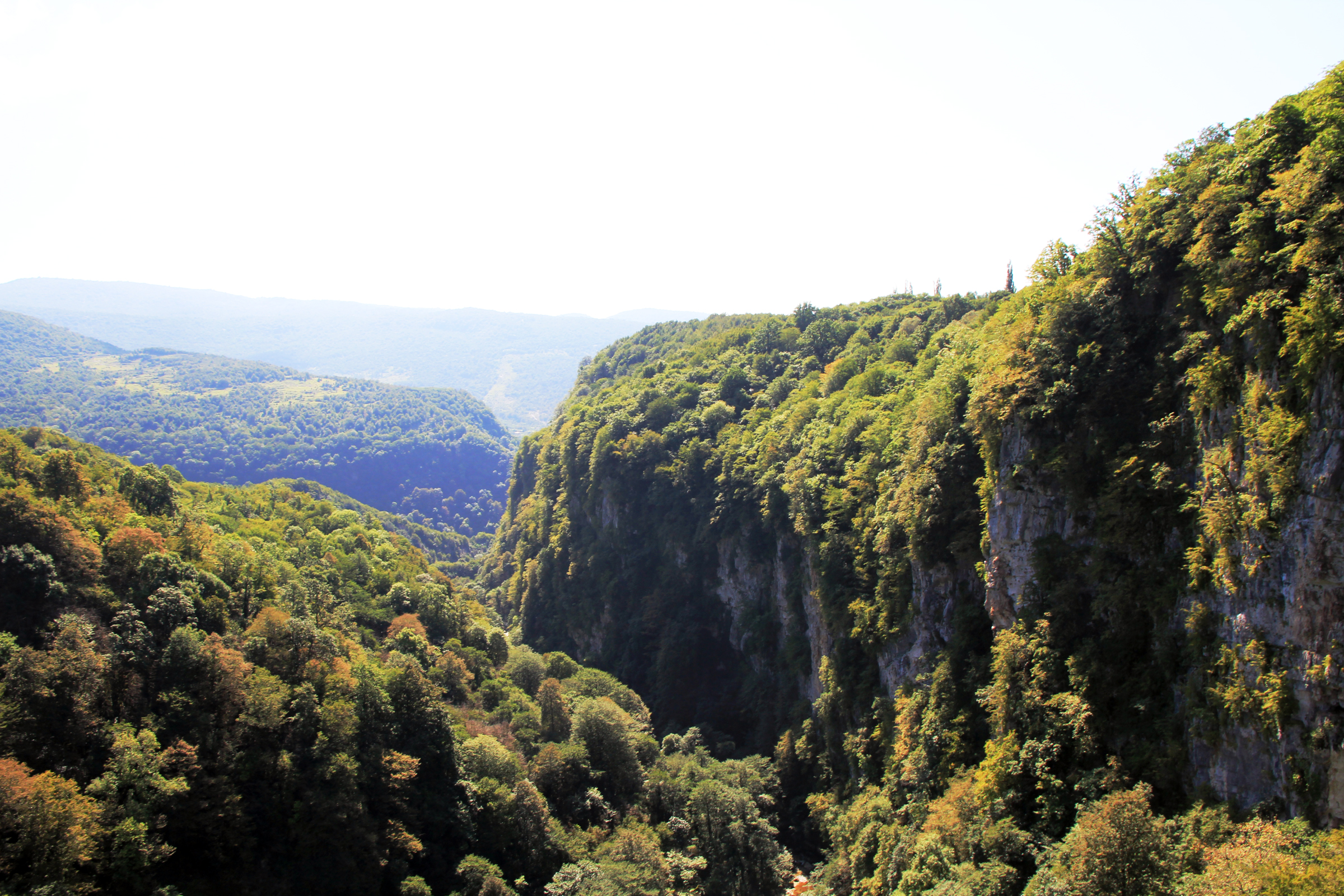
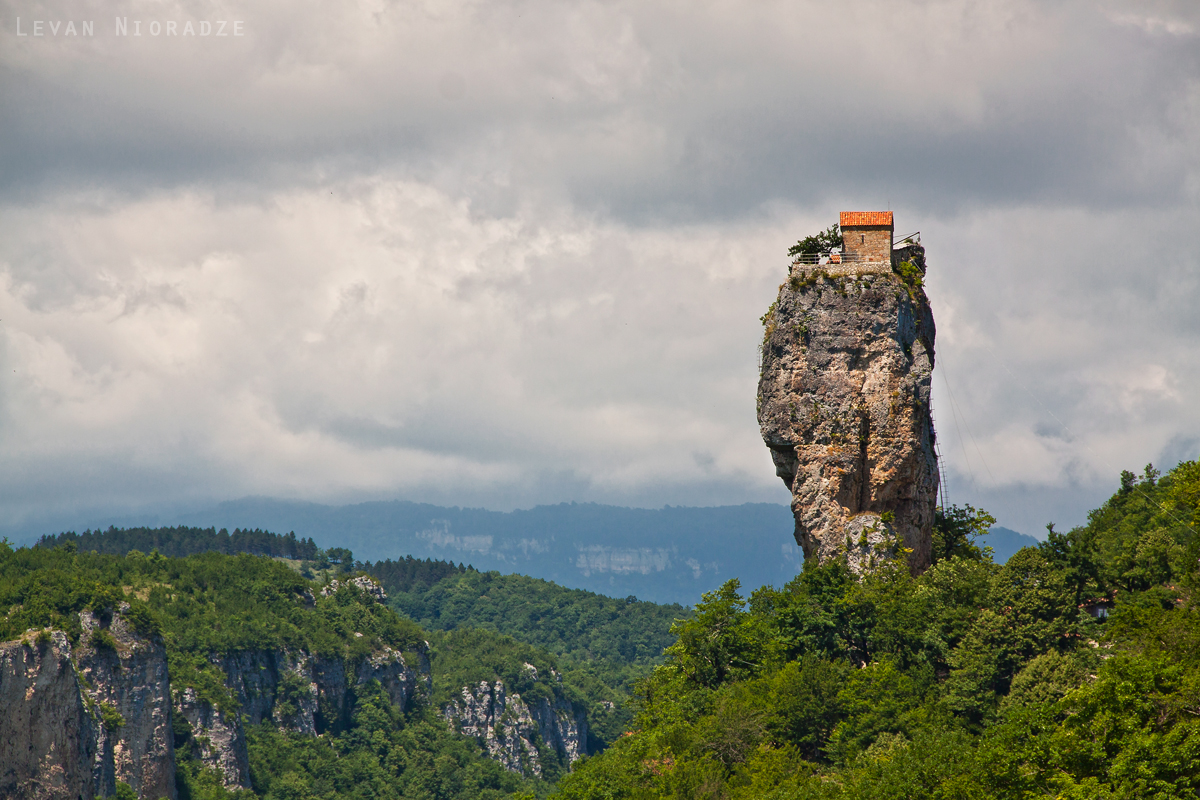
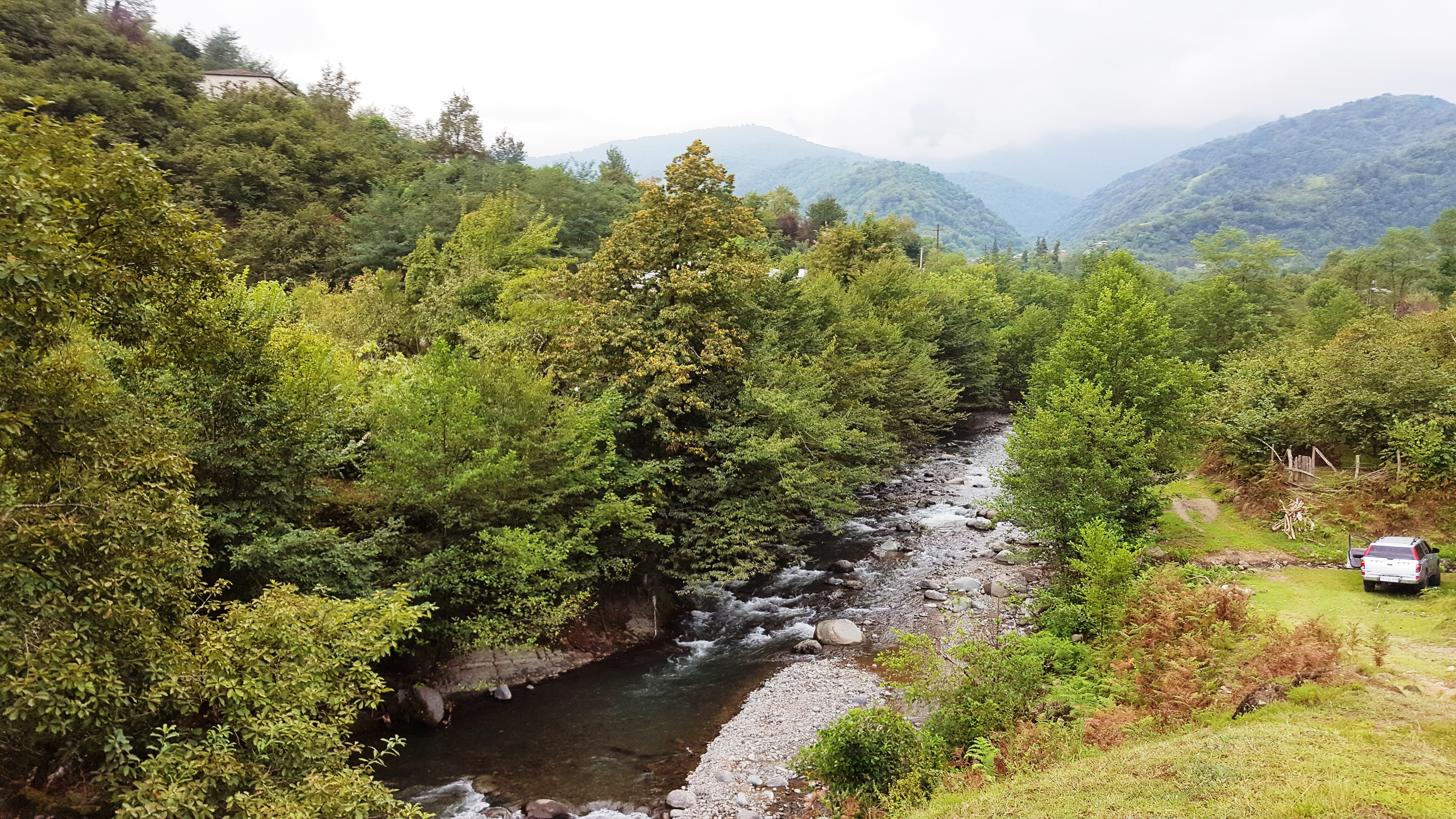
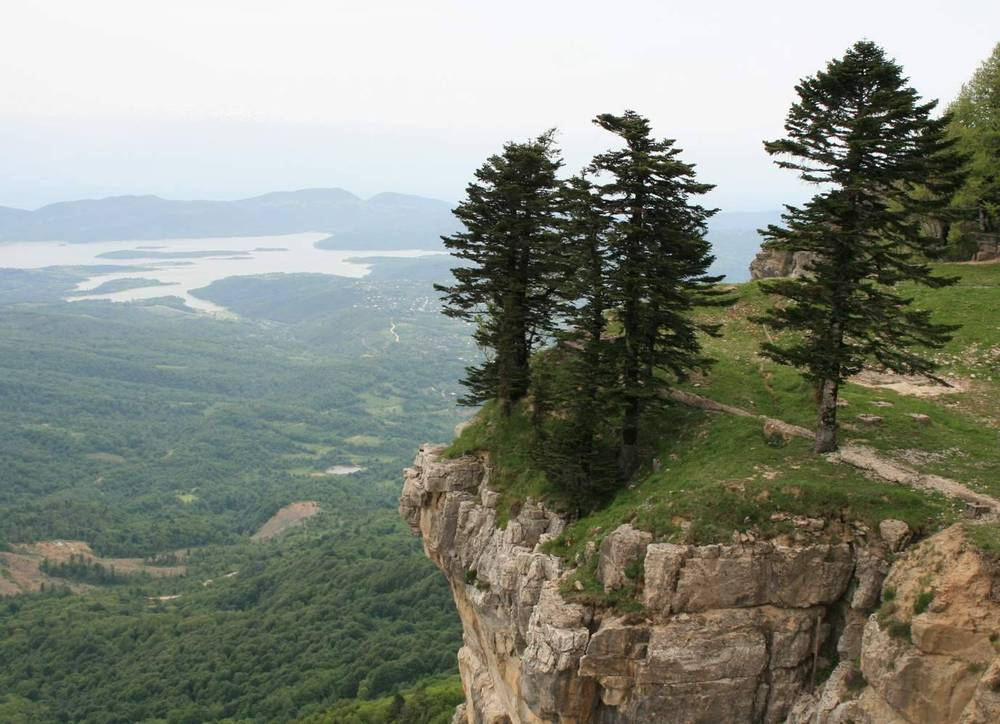
- From the top to bottom-right: Kutaisi, Okatse Canyon, Katskhi Pillar, Sulori Gorge, Tkibuli Reservoir

- Overlapping borders of de jure Imereti region and de facto South Ossetia (Note: South Ossetia's status is disputed. It considers itself to be an independent state, but this is recognised by only a few other countries. The Georgian government and most of the world's other states consider South Ossetia de jure a part of Georgia's territory.)
- Country: Georgia
- Capital: Kutaisi

Government
  - Governor: Zviad Shalamberidze (Georgian Dream)

Area (Note: Nominal area 6,680 km², de facto controlled by Georgia 6,415 km².)
  - Total: 6,680 km^{2} (2,580 sq mi)

Population (2024)
  - Total: 442,373
  - Density: 66.2/km^{2} (172/sq mi)

Gross Regional Product
  - Total: ₾ 5.51 billion (2022)
  - Per capita: ₾ 11,444 (2022)
- ISO 3166 code: GE-IM
- Districts: 11 districts, 1 city
- HDI (2023): 0.855 very high · 3rd
- Website: imereti.ge

Imereti (Georgian: იმერეთი, pronounced [imeɾetʰi]) is a region of Georgia situated in the central-western part of the republic along the middle and upper reaches of the Rioni River. Imereti is the most populous region in Georgia. It consists of 11 municipalities and the city of Kutaisi, which is the capital of the region.

== Subdivisions ==
The Imereti region has one self governing city (Kutaisi) and 11 municipalities with 163 administrative communities (temi), totalling to 549 populated settlements:

- Eleven cities: Baghdati, Chiatura, Khoni, Kutaisi, Sachkhere, Samtredia, Terjola, Tkibuli, Tsqaltubo, Vani and Zestaponi;
- Three dabas: Kharagauli, Kulashi and Shorapani;
- Villages: 535

| Map | Municipality |
|---|---|
City of Kutaisi
Baghdati Municipality
Vani Municipality
Zestaponi Municipality
Terjola Municipality
Samtredia Municipality
Sachkhere Municipality
Tkibuli Municipality
Chiatura Municipality
Tsqaltubo Municipality
Kharagauli Municipality
Khoni Municipality

== Economy ==
Aside from the capital Kutaisi, significant towns and regional centres include Samtredia, Chiatura (manganese production centre), Tkibuli (coal mining centre), Zestaponi (known for metals production), Vani, Khoni, and Sachkhere. Traditionally, Imereti is an agricultural region, known for its mulberries and grapes.

== Demographics ==
The Imeretians (Georgian: იმერლები) are one of the ethnographic groups of Georgians, inhabiting Imereti. Imeretians are Orthodox Christians and speak the Imeretian dialect, one of the Northwest dialects of the Georgian language. It is itself subdivided into Upper and Lower Imeretian.

Demographic history of the Imereti region
| | 1959 | 1970 | 1979 | 1989 | 2002* | 2002** | 2014 | 2021 |
| Imereti | ▲651,959 | ▲718,558 | ▲739,189 | ▲772,251 | ▼699,410 | ▼632,126 | ▼533,906 | ▼481,473 |
|---|---|---|---|---|---|---|---|---|
| City of Kutaisi | ▲128,203 | ▲162,787 | ▲194,297 | ▲234,870 | ▼185,965 | - | ▼147,635 | ▼134,378 |
| Baghdati Municipality | ▲29,560 | ▲30,973 | ▼30,056 | ▼29,053 | ▲29,235 | - | ▼21,582 | ▼18,363 |
| Chiatura Municipality | ▲64,562 | ▲72,059 | ▼69,582 | ▼68,501 | ▼56,341 | - | ▼39,884 | ▼38,231 |
| Kharagauli Municipality | ▲36,486 | ▼35,591 | ▼31,948 | ▼28,702 | ▼27,885 | - | ▼19,473 | ▼18,571 |
| Khoni Municipality | ▲32,548 | ▲32,718 | ▲37,968 | ▼34,979 | ▼31,749 | - | ▼23,570 | ▼21,123 |
| Sachkhere Municipality*** | ▲38,202 | ▲45,552 | ▼44,859 | ▲44,968 | ▲46,590 | - | ▼37,775 | ▼34,848 |
| Samtredia Municipality | ▲62,556 | ▲67,141 | ▼65,400 | ▼64,504 | ▼60,456 | - | ▼48,562 | ▼43,448 |
| Terjola Municipality | ▲43,847 | ▲46,438 | ▼44,709 | ▼44,019 | ▲45,496 | - | ▼35,563 | ▼31,427 |
| Tkibuli Municipality | ▲44,411 | ▼42,733 | ▼39,451 | ▼36,686 | ▲31,132 | - | ▼20,839 | ▼17,898 |
| Tsqaltubo Municipality | ▲62,389 | ▲67,086 | ▲69,738 | ▲75,061 | ▲73,889 | - | ▼56,883 | ▼46,803 |
| Vani Municipality | ▲40,999 | ▲41,505 | ▼38,346 | ▼35,369 | ▼34,464 | - | ▼24,512 | ▼21,241 |
| Zestaponi Municipality | ▲68,196 | ▲73,975 | ▼72,835 | ▲75,539 | ▲76,208 | - | ▼57,628 | ▼55,142 |
* Research after 2014 census showed the 2002 census was inflated by 8-9 percent. **Corrected data based on retro-projection 1994–2014 in collaboration with UN *** Part of Sachkhere is outside Georgian government authority and has not been counted since 2002.

== History ==
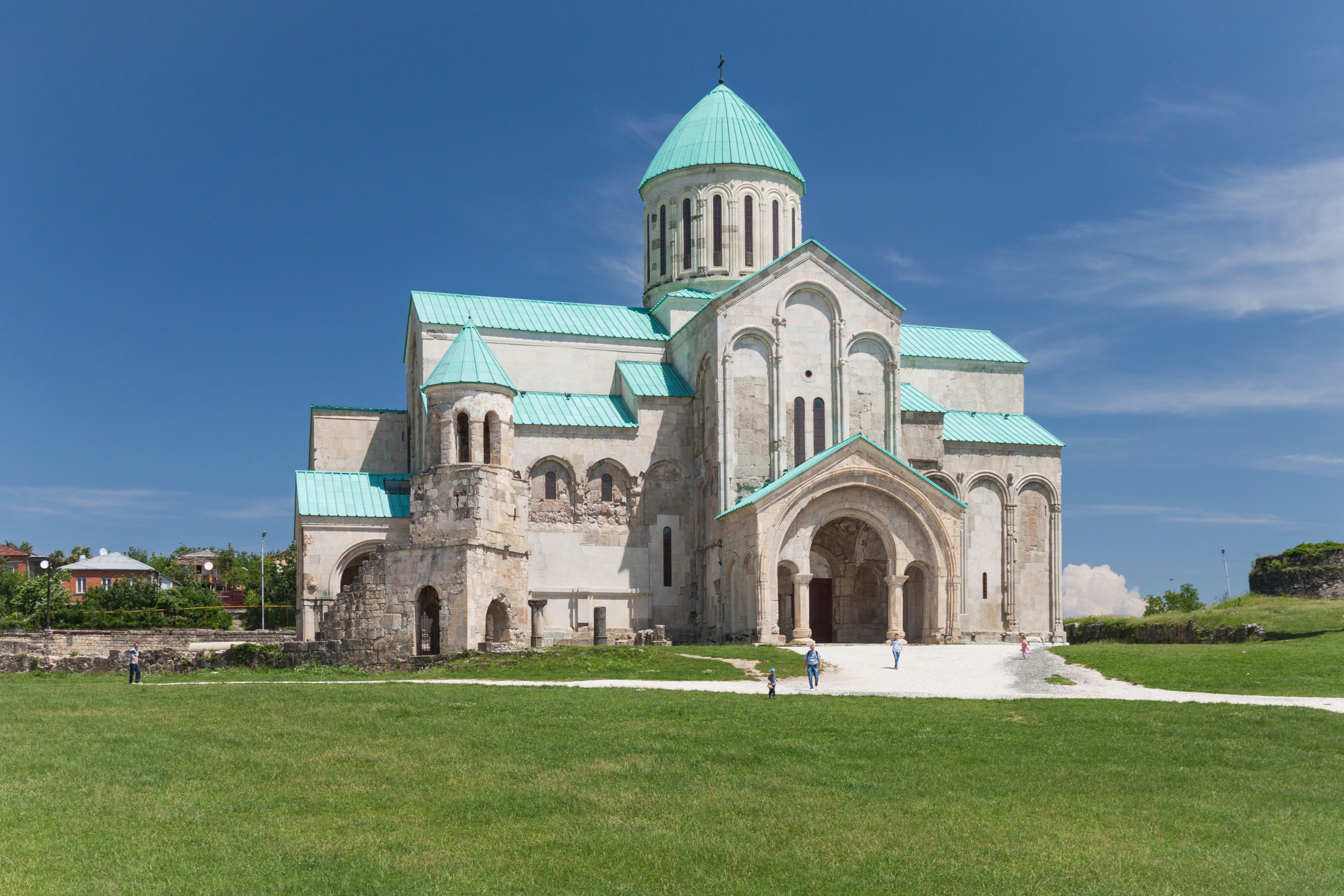
Bagrati Cathedral in Kutaisi

In ancient times, the region was a part of the Kingdom of Colchis, until it was conquered by the Kingdom of Pontus. After the Third Mithridatic War, Colchis was under loose Roman control, and unsuccessfully revolted in 69 AD under Anicetus. After the collapse of Colchis, the kingdom of Lazica was established in 131 AD as a Roman vassal. Tzath I was the first Christian king of Lazica, being baptized in Constantinople in 523 AD, and fighting alongside Eastern Roman emperor Justinian I in the Iberian War. In 541 AD, the region became the theatre of the Lazic War between Justinian I and Sasanian Persian emperor Khosrow I.

Between 750 and 985, Imereti was ruled by a dynasty of native princes, but was devastated by hostile incursions, reviving only after it became united to Georgia. After the Mongol invasions of Georgia, Imereti was intermittently part of the independent Kingdom of Western Georgia, until being reunited in 1415 as the Duchy of Samokalako under the united Georgian Kingdom. Since that kingdom's disintegration in the 15th century, Imereti was an independent kingdom from 1466 onwards.

In the 17th–18th centuries, the kingdom of Imereti experienced frequent invasions by the Turks and paid patronage to the Ottoman Empire until 1810, when it was invaded and annexed by the Russian Empire. The last King of Imereti was Solomon II (1789–1810).

From 1918 to 1921, Imereti was part of the independent Democratic Republic of Georgia. Within the USSR, the region was part of the Transcaucasian SFSR from 1922 to 1936, and part of the Georgian SSR from 1936 to 1991. Since Georgian independence in 1991, Imereti has been a region of Georgia with Kutaisi as the regional capital.

== See also ==
- Kingdom of Imereti
- Administrative divisions of Georgia (country)
