= Otar Lordkipanidze =

Georgian archaeologist

Otar Lordkipanidze (Georgian: ოთარ ლორთქიფანიძე; October 30, 1930 – May 19, 2002) was a Georgian archaeologist best known for his studies of the ancient sites of Colchis and Iberia and the presence of the Achaemenid culture in the South Caucasus. He was the father of the Georgian paleoanthropologist David Lordkipanidze.
