= Solkota Cave Natural Monument =

Karst cave in Imereti region of Georgia

- IUCN category III (natural monument or feature)
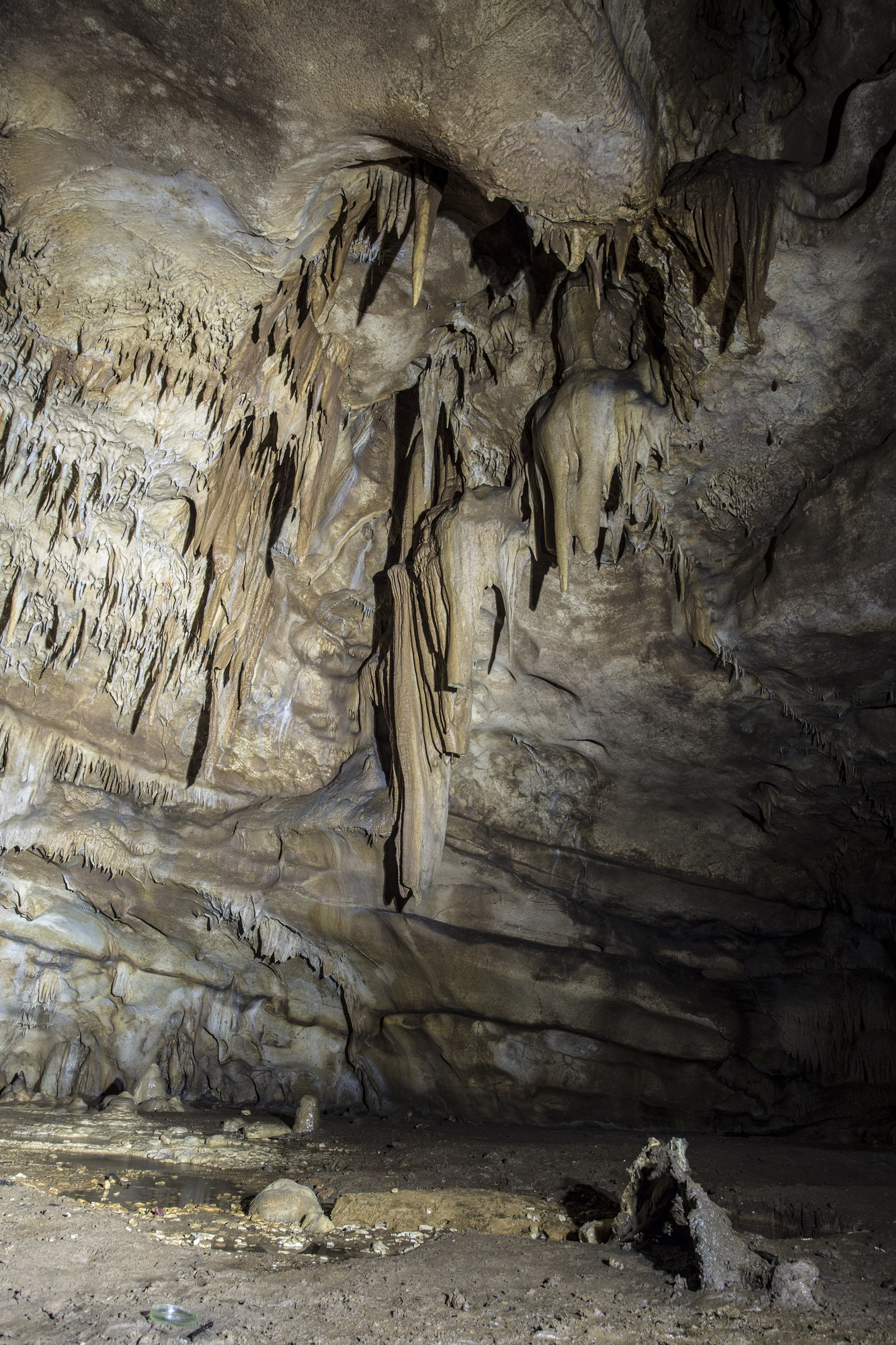

- Location within Georgia Location within Imereti
- Nearest city: Tskaltubo
- Coordinates: 42°23′22.4″N 42°37′03.5″E
- Area: 0.0 km^{2} (0 sq mi)
- Established: 2011
- Governing body: Agency of Protected Areas
- Website: სოლკოტას მღვიმის ბუნების ძეგლი

Solkota Cave Natural Monument (Georgian: სოლკოტას მღვიმე) is a karst cave 2.3 km to the north of village Kumistavi, known for nearby Prometheus Cave Natural Monument, in Tskaltubo Municipality in Imereti region of Georgia, 20 km from Kutaisi. Cave is located on the left bank of river Semi, 379 meters above sea level.

== Morphology ==
Solkota Cave formed in Sataphlia-Tskaltubo karst massif. Cave entrance is at the bottom of a well in a karst topography covered by vegetation. From here steep corridor expands to 10-15 m and morphs into horizontal floor that leads to a chamber with height of almost 30 m. Cave has an interesting diversity of chemical sediments, stalactites and stalagmites. Of particular interest are stalactites of 5 m thickness, size which is rare in Europe. Also notable is an 8 m high stalagmite with the circumference of 8.5 m at it bottom and 4.5 m in the middle.

== Fauna ==
The inhabitants of the cave include Trachysphaera, Colchidoniscus, Laemostenus, Arrhopalites, Pygmarrhopalites, Plutomurus and Oxychilus.

== Paleontological findings ==
The cave is a paleontological and in particular a molecular paleontology monument. Solkota Cave stalagmites preserved ancient DNA molecules of mammals (bear, roe deer, bats) and plants (chestnut, hazelnut, flax). Bones of cave bear has been found here.

== See also ==
- Prometheus Cave Natural Monument
