= Melouri Cave Natural Monument =

Cave in Georgia

- IUCN category III (natural monument or feature)
- Location within Georgia Location within Imereti
- Nearest city: Tskaltubo
- Coordinates: 42°23.241′N 42°37.670′E
- Established: 2011
- Governing body: Agency of Protected Areas
- Website: მელოურის მღვიმის ბუნების ძეგლი

Melouri Cave Natural Monument (Georgian: მელოურის მღვიმე) is a karst cave located near village Melouri (8 km from village Kumistavi) in Tsqaltubo Municipality in Imereti region of Georgia, 418 meters above sea level. Melouri Cave is one of the largest caves in Georgia. It is part of extensive Tsqaltubo Cave system which also includes nearby cave Didghele.

== Morphology ==
Melouri cave has overall length of at least 15 km and boasts two naturally formed canyons with beautiful underground waterfalls. Cave carved in Sataphlia-Tskaltubo karst massif The entrance to the cave is at the bottom of the 8-10 meters deep ditch. Near the entrance cave is difficult to navigate due to presence of gypsum limestone boulders of up to 15 m height. Further inside cave pass is clearer with characteristic network of fissures, their intersections are 30 m by 40 m wide. At the end of the sequence of halls, a few kilometers long, there is an erosion canyon with an underground river. It creates waterfalls as it traverses the canyon and in the last hall there is a siphon lake. Interior of the cave is naturally decorated with chemical sediments: stalactites and large stalagmites. The cave is inhabited by bats, spiders, and beetles. Exploring Melouri Cave is not extremely challenging but caving equipment is required: headlamp and waterproof caving boots. The cave has not been completely investigated and has many unknown corridors and branches.

== Fauna ==
The inhabitants of the cave include Bergrothia.

== See also ==
- Didghele Cave Natural Monument
- Bgheri Cave Natural Monument
- Prometheus Cave Natural Monument
