= Didghele Cave Natural Monument =

Cave in Georgia

- IUCN category III (natural monument or feature)
- Location within Georgia Location within Imereti
- Nearest city: Tskaltubo
- Coordinates: 42°23′24″N 42°37′44.4″E
- Established: 2011
- Governing body: Agency of Protected Areas
- Website: დიდღელის მღვიმის ბუნების ძეგლი (Didghele Cave Natural Monument)

Didghele Cave Natural Monument (Georgian: დიდღელეს მღვიმე) is a karst cave located near village Melouri in Tsqaltubo Municipality in Imereti region of Georgia, 418 meters above sea level.

== Morphology ==
Made of reef limestone (Barremian), the cave was created by river Osunela. The cave is 750 m in length. The river Didghele flows into the cave. It has many loamy ceilings, walls, clay slabs and more. An existing cleft at the entrance of the cave is a leaking stream, which also forms a small temporary lake.

== Tourist information ==
The cave is of average difficulty, but still requires special equipment to visit it. It is part of extensive Tsqaltubo Cave system which also includes nearby cave Melouri.

== See also ==
- Bgheri Cave Natural Monument
- Prometheus Cave Natural Monument
