= Bgheri Cave Natural Monument =

Cave in Georgia

- IUCN category III (natural monument or feature)
- Location within Georgia Location within Imereti
- Interactive map of Bgheri Cave Natural Monument
- Nearest city: Tskaltubo
- Coordinates: 42°23′2.4″N 42°37′48″E
- Established: 2011
- Governing body: Agency of Protected Areas
- Website: Bgheri Cave Natural Monument

Bgheri Cave Natural Monument (Georgian: ბღერის მღვიმე), also known as Bgheristskali cave, is a seasonal karst cave located near road between villages of Kumistavi and Qvilishori in Tsqaltubo Municipality in Imereti region of Georgia.

== Morphology ==
Made of reef limestone (Barremian) cave was created by river Bgheristskali. The cave is 1,700 m (5,600 ft) in length and spreads over an area of 14,000 m^{2} (150,000 sq ft). Initially the river creates a gorge with no openings and then flows into a narrow pond. Cave entrance is a 30 m (98 ft) long and 40–50 cm (16–20 in) high hole filled with fine sand and tree branches washed in from Bgheristskali river estuaries. Here Bgheristskali river is joined by permanent water flows from Melouri and Didghele caves. The river crosses an open space from east to west and disappears at the western ending in Nazvavi river and a small shallow siphon. Effects of erosion activity are clearly visible inside Bgheri Cave. It is characterized by huge halls, underground rivers with beautiful waterfalls and many amazing cave formations. Bgheri cave is part of extensive Tsqaltubo Cave system which also includes nearby cave Melouri.

== Tourist information ==
Access to the cave is seasonal and depends on the water level of the Bgeristskali River. During seasonal floods, the cave entrance is closed. Visitors without specialized equipment can only enter during drought periods, when water levels are low and the entrance becomes accessible.

== See also ==
- List of natural monuments of Georgia
- Didghele Cave Natural Monument
- Prometheus Cave Natural Monument
