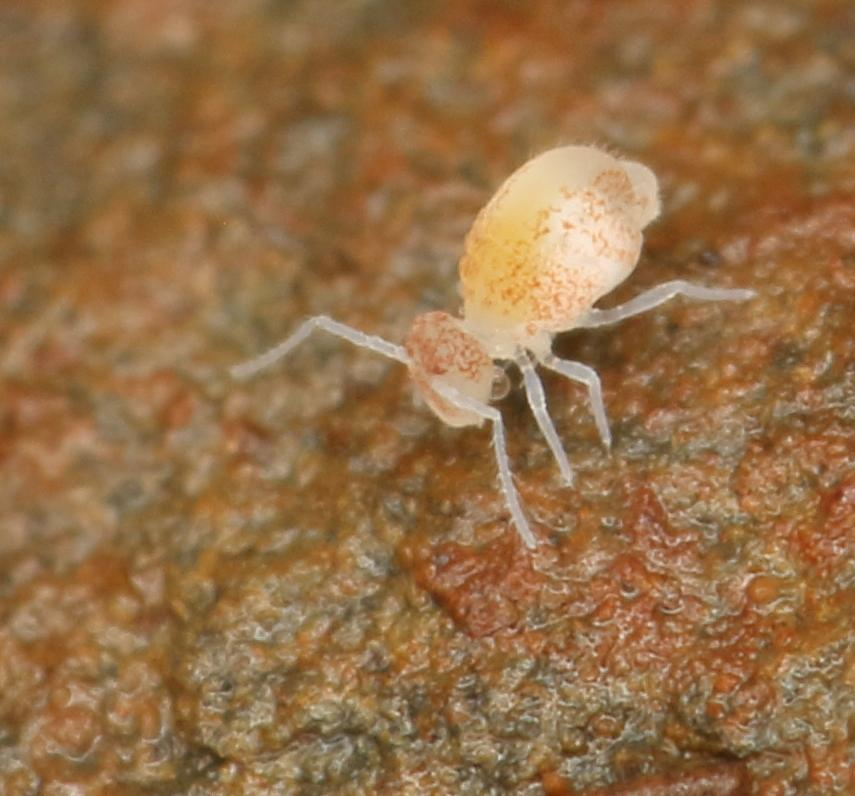

Scientific classification
- Domain: Eukaryota
- Kingdom: Animalia
- Phylum: Arthropoda
- Class: Collembola
- Order: Symphypleona
- Family: Arrhopalitidae

Genera
- See text

= Arrhopalitidae =

Family of springtails

Arrhopalitidae is a family of springtails belonging to the order Symphypleona.

== Genera ==
Arrhopalitidae includes the following genera:

- Arrhopalites Börner, 1906
- Pygmarrhopalites Vargovitsh, 2009
- Troglopalites Vargovitsh, 2012
