= Arrhopalites =

Scientific classification
- Domain: Eukaryota
- Kingdom: Animalia
- Phylum: Arthropoda
- Class: Collembola
- Order: Symphypleona
- Family: Arrhopalitidae
- Genus: Arrhopalites; Borner, 1906

Genus of springtails

Arrhopalites is a genus of springtails in the family Arrhopalitidae.

== Species ==
- Arrhopalites acanthophthalmus
- Arrhopalites buekkensis
- Arrhopalites caecus Tullberg, 1871
- Arrhopalites cochlearifer Gisin, 1947
- Arrhopalites dudichii
- Arrhopalites hungaricus
- Arrhopalites ornatus
- Arrhopalites principalis Stach, 1945
- Arrhopalites pseudoappendices Rusek, 1967
- Arrhopalites pygmaeus (Wankel, 1860)
- Arrhopalites secundarius Gisin, 1958
- Arrhopalites sericus Gisin, 1947
- Arrhopalites spinosus Rusek, 1967
- Arrhopalites terricola
- Arrhopalites tenuis
- Arrhopalites ulehlovae
