= Prometheus Cave Natural Monument =

Cave in Georgia

- Kumistavi Cave, Orpiri I Cave, Tskaltubo Cave
- IUCN category III (natural monument or feature)
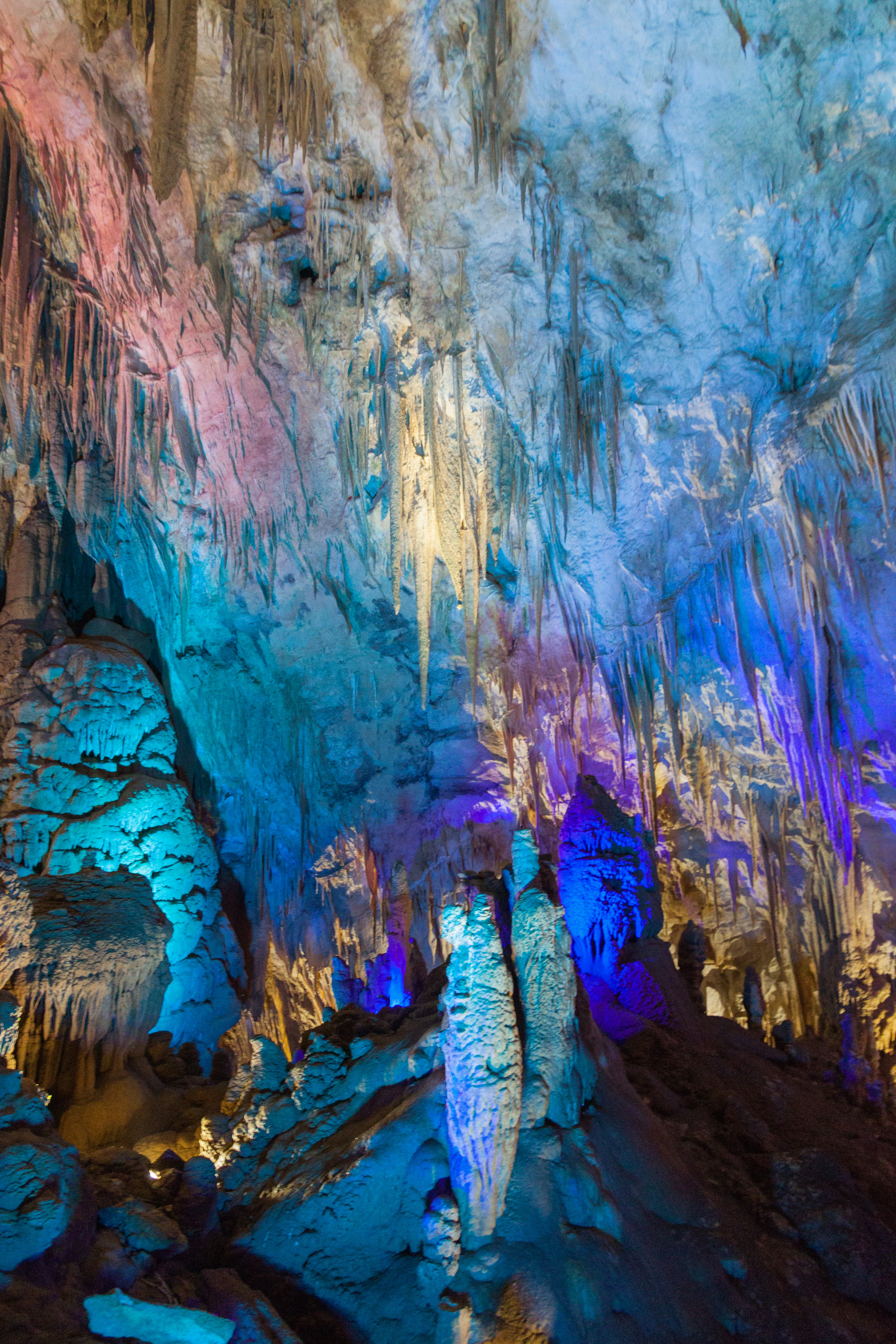
- Prometheus Cave also known as Kumistavi Cave.

- Location within Imereti Location within Georgia
- Interactive map of Prometheus Cave Natural Monument
- Nearest city: Kutaisi
- Coordinates: 42°22′36″N 42°36′02″E
- Area: 0.47 km^{2} (0.18 sq mi)
- Established: 2007
- Website: Prometheus Cave Natural Monument

Prometheus Cave Natural Monument (Georgian: პრომეთეს მღვიმე) also known as Kumistavi Cave (Georgian: ყუმისთავის მღვიმე) and Tsqaltubo Cave (Georgian: ღლიანის მღვიმე) is a karst cave located in Tsqaltubo Municipality in Imereti region of Georgia.

== Morphology ==
Prometheus Cave formed in Sataphlia-Tskaltubo karst massif. The total length of the cave is about 11 km, of which 1800 m are open to visitors. The cave has a total of 22 halls, six of which are currently open to tourists. Visitors currently could experience these caves at depths of about 80 mts below ground level.

== Fauna ==
The inhabitants of the cave include Trachysphaera, Folsomides, Pseudachorutes, Inotrechus, Laemostenus, Bergrothia, Ceratophysella, Hypogastrura, Pseudacherontides, Sphaeridia, Folsomia, Plutomurus, Proisotoma, Campodea, Cochlicopa, Vitrinoxychilus, Physella, Codiella, Graptoppia, Oribella, Macrocheles and Xiphocaridinella.

== History ==
The cave was discovered and studied by Georgian speleologists (consisted of the leader Mr. Jumber Jishkariani and the members: Tamaz Kobulashvili, Amiran Jamrishvili, Vakhtang Kapanadze, Kote Nizharadze) in the early 1980s. It is part of a large cave system, united by one underground river. Currently, about 30 km of the river has been investigated, which is about half the length of the entire cave system. In 1985 the conversion of the cave into a sightseeing tourist destination began. By 1989, a pedestrian route was laid in the cave for about 1 kilometer, stairs and paths were built, and a 150-meter tunnel was punched out at the exit and the construction of ground-floor buildings began. The cave was equipped with temporary lighting, and small groups of tourists started to visit.

In 1990, due to the collapse of the Soviet Union and a lack of funds, the project was closed. For several years a local citizen protected the cave from vandals, as memorialized by a statue of him and his dog at the cave's entrance.

In 2007, 17 years after the closure of the project, the Georgian authorities returned to the idea of converting the cave into a tourist destination once again. President of Georgia Mikheil Saakashvili, who visited the cave in 2010, gave an impetus to transform the cave into a tourist attraction. He also suggested a new name for the cave — Prometheus Cave, as according to legend the Greek god Prometheus was chained to the mountains in this area. (Local legend makes Prometheus enchained to the bluffs of Khvamli, being perpetually tortured by a raven.) After restoration works, the cave was reopened to visitors on May 26, 2011.

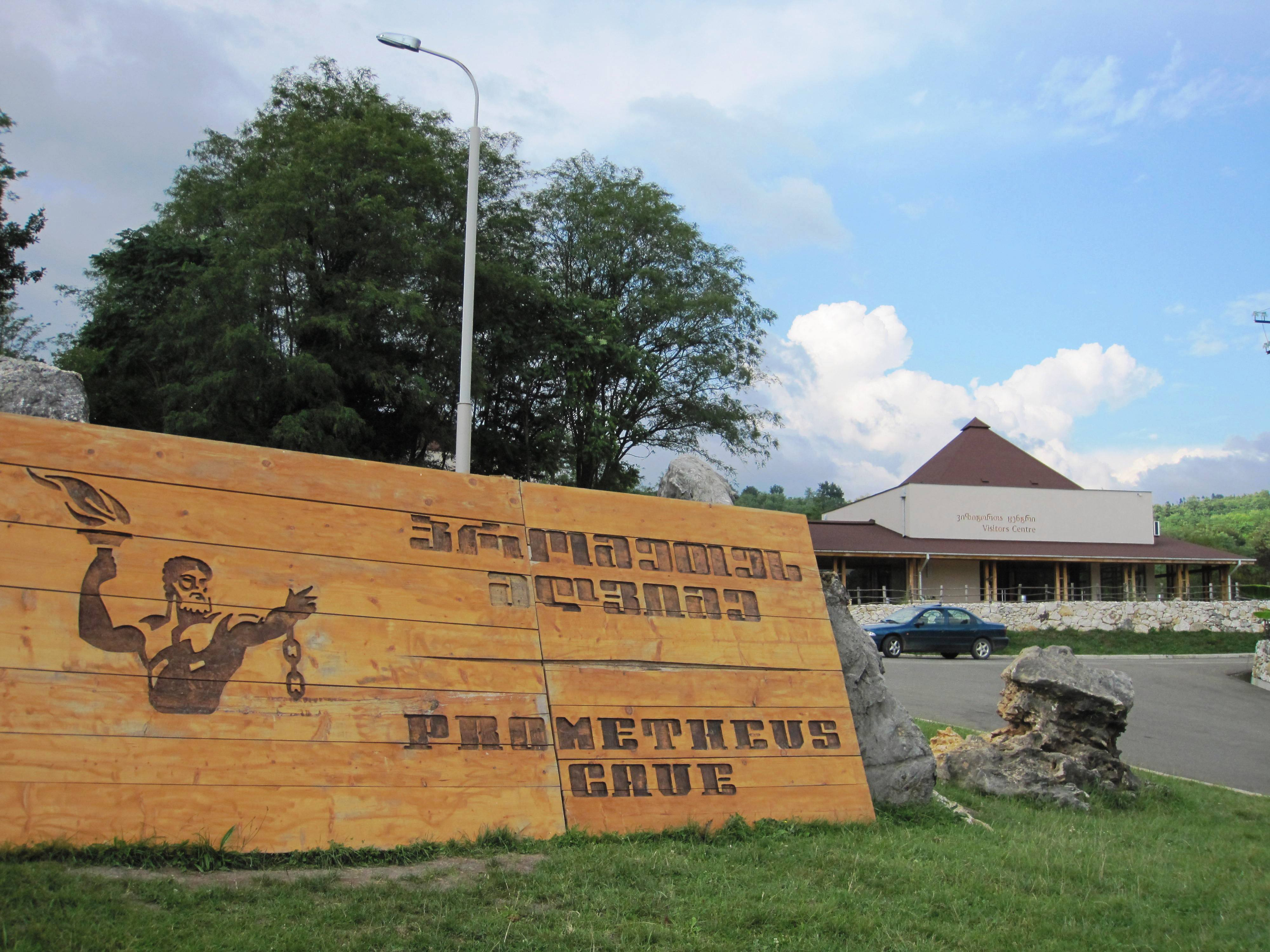
Prometheus Cave visitors center.

== See also ==
- Bgheri Cave Natural Monument
- Didghele Cave Natural Monument
- Solkota Cave Natural Monument
