= Inotrechus =

Scientific classification
- Domain: Eukaryota
- Kingdom: Animalia
- Phylum: Arthropoda
- Class: Insecta
- Order: Coleoptera
- Suborder: Adephaga
- Family: Carabidae
- Subfamily: Trechinae
- Tribe: Trechini
- Subtribe: Trechina
- Genus: Inotrechus; Dolzhanski & Ljovushkin, 1989

Genus of beetles

Inotrechus is a genus in the beetle family Carabidae. There are at least two described species in Inotrechus, found in the country of Georgia.

== Species ==
These two species belong to the genus Inotrechus:

- Inotrechus injaevae Dolzhanski & Ljovushkin, 1989
- Inotrechus kurnakovi Dolzhanski & Ljovushkin, 1989
