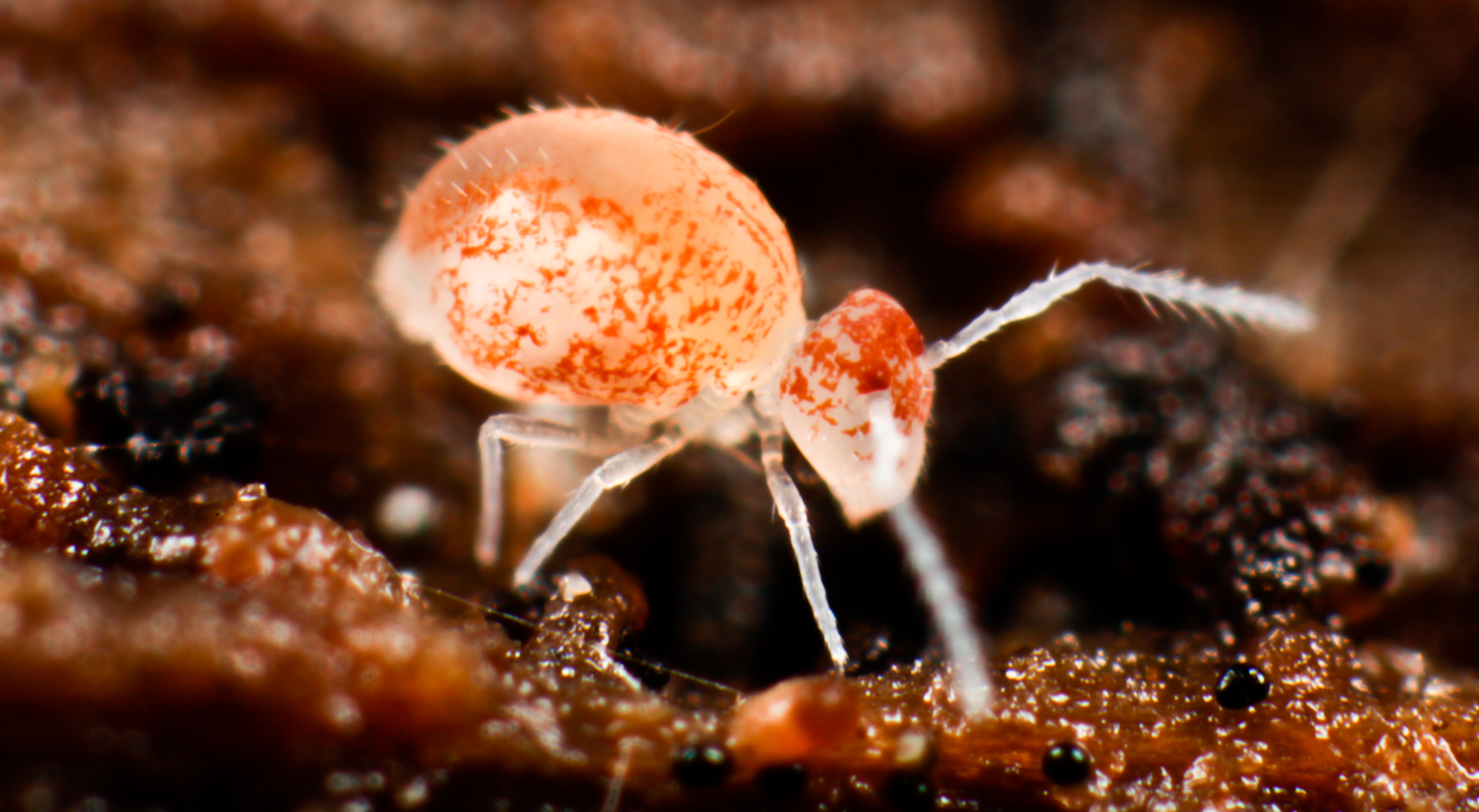
- Arrhopalites principalis

Scientific classification
- Kingdom: Animalia
- Phylum: Arthropoda
- Clade: Pancrustacea
- Class: Collembola
- Order: Symphypleona
- Family: Arrhopalitidae
- Genus: Pygmarrhopalites; Vargovitsh, 2009

= Pygmarrhopalites =

Genus of springtails

Pygmarrhopalites is a genus of springtails belonging to the family Arrhopalitidae. The species of this genus are found in Europe and Northern America.

== Species ==
Species:

- Pygmarrhopalites aggtelekiensis (Stach, 1930)
- Pygmarrhopalites alticolus (Yosii, 1970)
- Pygmarrhopalites altus (Christiansen, 1966)
