= Tsqaltubo =

Tskaltubo წყალტუბო
- Town
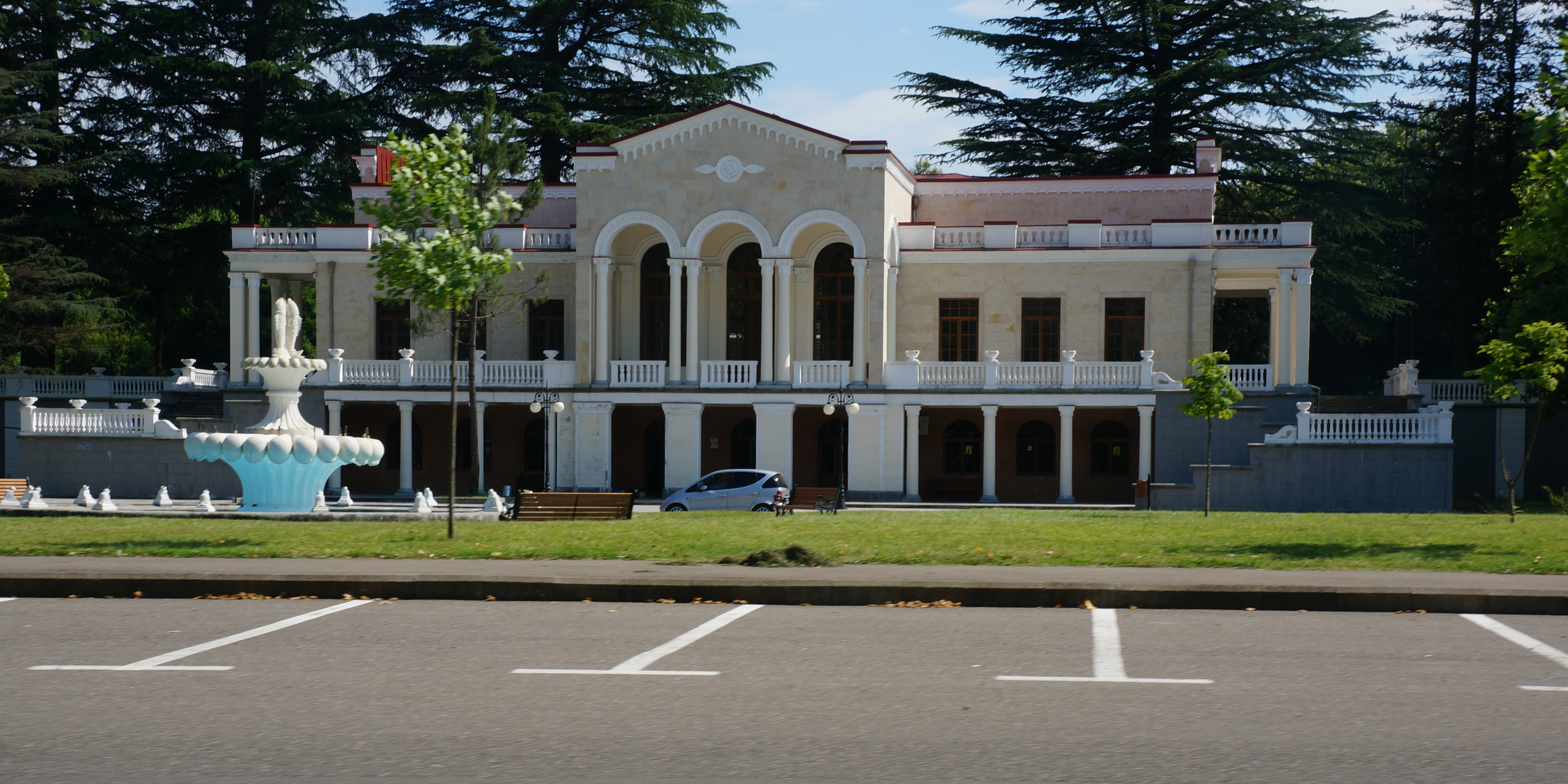
- Tskaltubo Railway Station

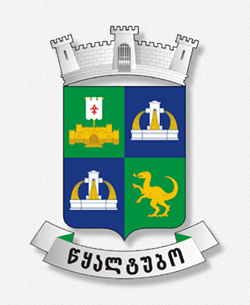
- Flag Seal

- Location within Imereti Location within Georgia
- Coordinates: 42°19′35″N 42°36′02″E
- Country: Georgia
- Region: Imereti
- District: Tskaltubo
- Elevation: 120 m (390 ft)

Population (1 January 2024)
  - Total: 7,378
- Time zone: UTC+4 (Georgian Time)
- Area code: +995 436
- Website: tskaltubo.gov.ge

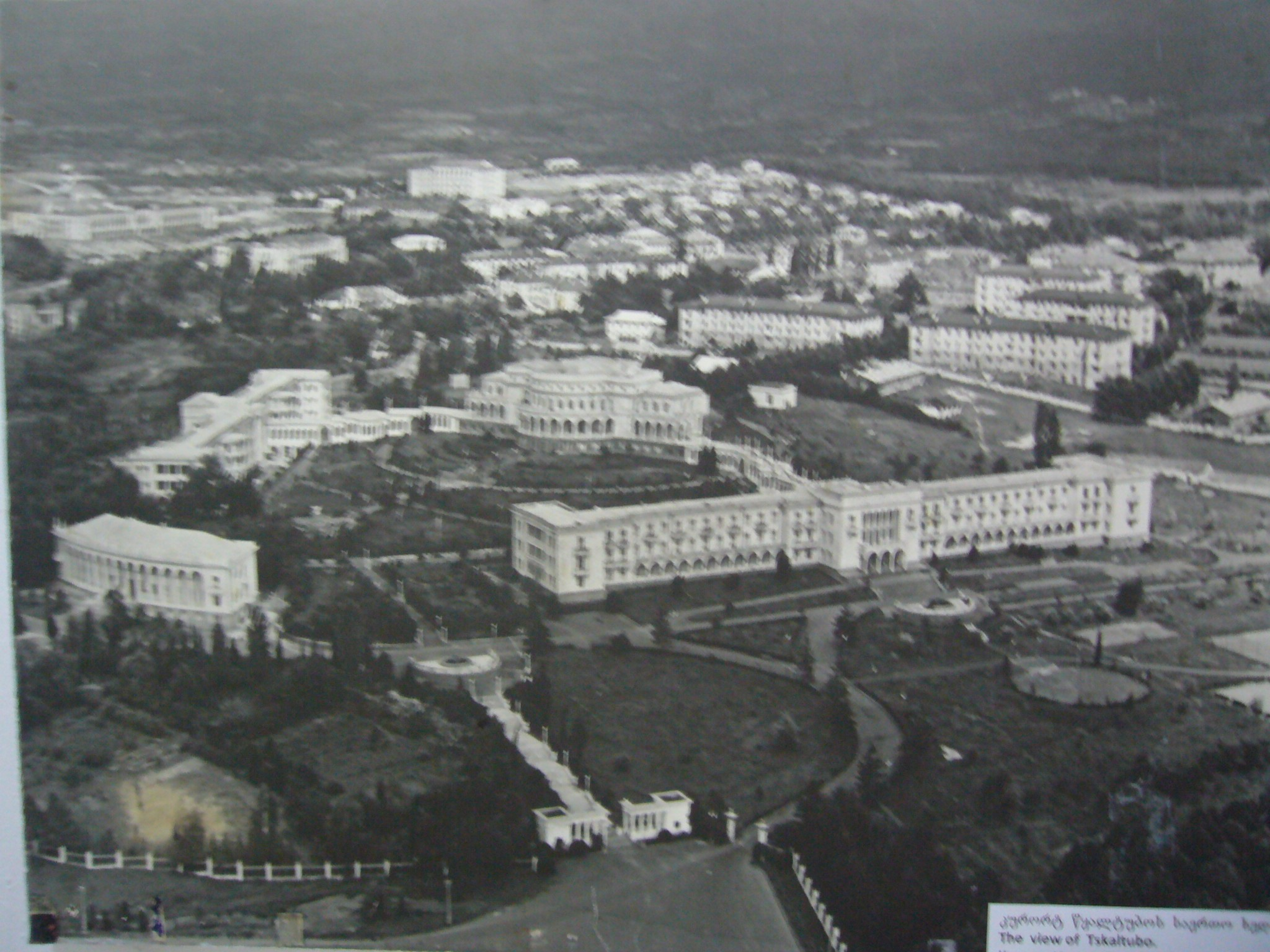
An aerial photograph of the Soviet Ministry of Defense's sanatorium in the 1950s.

Tskaltubo or Tsqaltubo (Georgian: წყალტუბო [ˈt͡s'χ'äɫt'ubo̞]) is a spa resort in western Georgia. It is the main town of the Tsqaltubo Municipality of the Imereti province. It is known for its radon-carbonate mineral springs, whose natural temperature of 33–35 °C (91–95 °F) enables the water to be used without preliminary heating.

The resort's focus is on balneotherapy for circulatory, nervous, musculo-skeletal, gynaecological and skin diseases, but since the 1970s its repertoire has included "speleotherapy", in which the cool dust-free environment of local caves is said to benefit pulmonary diseases.

Tskaltubo was popular in the Soviet Union, attracting around 125,000 visitors a year. Bathhouse 9 features a frieze of Stalin, and visitors can see the private pool where he bathed on his visits.

Following the dissolution of the Soviet Union and subsequent years of civil unrest and state collapse in Georgia in the 1990s, Tskaltubo has suffered from severe economic depression since 1991 as industries closed. Despite limited state-sponsored attempts to revive Tskaltubo's economic fortunes and to promote the regeneration of this historic spa town during former President Mikheil Saakashvili's government, most of the Soviet sanatoria are now abandoned and in ruins.

== Geography ==
Tskaltubo is located in the central lowland part of western Georgia, at the foot of the Southern Caucasus, 98 meters above the sea-level, in the valley of the river Tskaltubo. It is located 9 km from Kutaisi and 240 km from the Georgian capital Tbilisi. The climate in Tskaltubo is warm and moderately mild. The average annual temperature is +15C, and average annual precipitation is 76%. Winters here are warm and mild.

Tskaltubo is rich with karst caves. Such as "Satsurblia", "Prometheus" and "Sataplia" which provide visitors with breathtaking examples of stalactites, stalagmites, curtains, petrified waterfalls, cave pearls, underground rivers, and lakes. The temperature in the cave is always 13-15C.

Satsurblia cave is the first and only Speleotherapic - object in the Caucasus Region. The cave has unique climatic environment that gives it the ability be transformed to a recreational tourism destination for individuals with respiratory diseases ( e.g. Bronchial asthma, etc.). Speleotherapy, or underground climate-therapy, is a set of recreational therapy methods based on the use of underground microclimate to improve health.

The Prometheus cave is one of the longest in Georgia. Visitors can see the so-called halls of Argonauts, Colchis, Medea, Love, Prometheus and Iberia, which are reached by foot or a 15-minute boat ride.

The Sataplia reserve is best known for its footprints of dinosaurs. A transparent elevated platform provides views of the reserve and surrounding area.

== Architecture ==
Tskaltubo's architecture is a synthesis of Stalinist classicism and traditional Georgian decorative designs, with Gothic and Greco-Roman features. At its height in the 1960s and 70s, the town contained 22 sanatoriums. Several of the buildings were constructed by German prisoners of war, including the Hotel Tskaltubo Spa and Resort, built in 1948.

== History ==
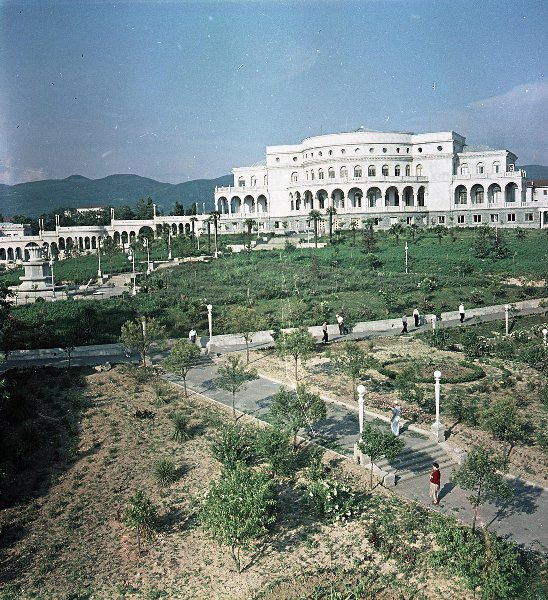
Sanatorium of the Soviet Ministry of Defense in 1957

The city's so-called "Waters of Immortality" may have been discovered some time between the 7th-9th centuries, when the oldest historical records of the area are dated. Since the 18th century, several foreign researchers promoted the healing properties of these springs: Berlin Society of Friends of Natural Science (1782); J. Klaproth (1815); A. Jolenberg (1897). By 1920, after a chemical analysis revealed the uniqueness of the water, Tskaltubo was officially declared by the Soviet government as a medical spa resort and achieved the status of city in 1953.

Tskaltubo became state property following during the short-lived Democratic Republic of Georgia, functioning as a balneology resort. Large-scale sanatoria began to be built in 1926. In 1931, following a decree by the government of Georgian SSR, Tskaltubo was designated as a spa resort and balneology center.

Architectural and civil engineering plans developed between 1950-51 envisaged a newly reconfigured expansion of the town where sanatoriums formed a circle around a park, recreation and balneology facilities. Tskaltubo was thus divided into balneological, sanitarian and living zones. Over the course of the next several years, 19 sanatoriums, nine baths, a resort park, and a branch of the Soviet Union's Scientific Institute of Balneology and Physiotherapy were built.

As one of Georgia's historic spa towns, the town is still known throughout the region for the medicinal qualities of its spring water. Tskaltubo's mineral springs are known locally for their stable physical and chemical composition and are categorized as slight radon chloride –magnesium waters. The high-performance spa preventive effect of the mineral spring waters is conditioned by their complex content and particular fusion of salt components.

Bathing in Tskaltubo's mineral springs has a peculiar technique, the treatments take place under constant running water (mineral water constantly flows in and out of the spa), and the water permanently preserves its physical-chemical and mineral compositions. The water consists of six components and penetrates into the human body via pores. The number of ingredients are far below the permissible minimum, while the water temperature is soft, between 33-35 °C, pure, and odorless.

Tskaltubo was once one of the largest spa towns in the Soviet Union, but when the country collapsed in late 1991, the city's sanatoriums were abandoned and turned into housing for Georgian refugees fleeing the War in Abkhazia. Visitor numbers to Tskaltubo have dwindled since the Soviet Union dissolved. The town now only receives approximately 700 visitors a year. Since 1993, many of the sanatorium complexes have been devoted to housing some 9000 refugees, primarily women and children, displaced from their homes by the Abkhaz-Georgian conflict.

There have been a number of unrealized plans to renovate Tskaltubo as a resort town.

== Mineral water baths ==
The unique radon-carbonated waters are Tskaltubo's major mineral resource. They emerge at a comfortable temperature for bathing (35 °C), allowing them to be directly transferred from springs to the baths without cooling or heating.

"Spring No. 6" is the largest thermal bath still in use. It was built in 1950, exclusively for Joseph Stalin. The private baths and dachas of Stalin and NKVD head Lavrenti Beria (both of whom were from Georgia) are still kept in the city. The mineral water flows directly into Buildings #1 and #6. There are five pools of mineral water, 37 individual cabins for bathing mineral water, and 17 hydro-massage cabinets.

Tskaltubo has over 2000 natural springs.

== Sport ==
Samgurali Tskaltubo, founded in 1945, is one the country's top football teams.

== Gallery ==
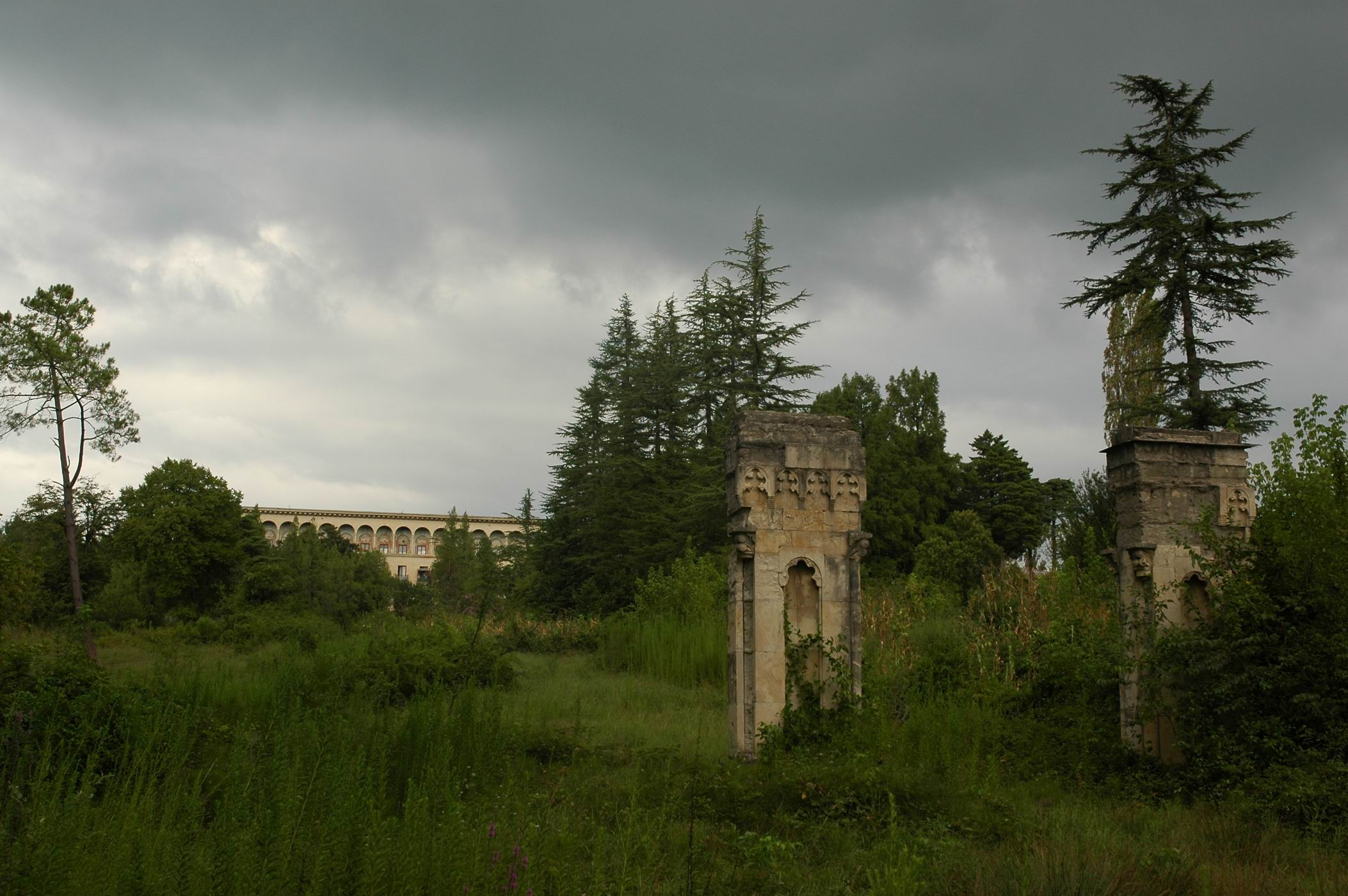
Sanatorium Metallurg

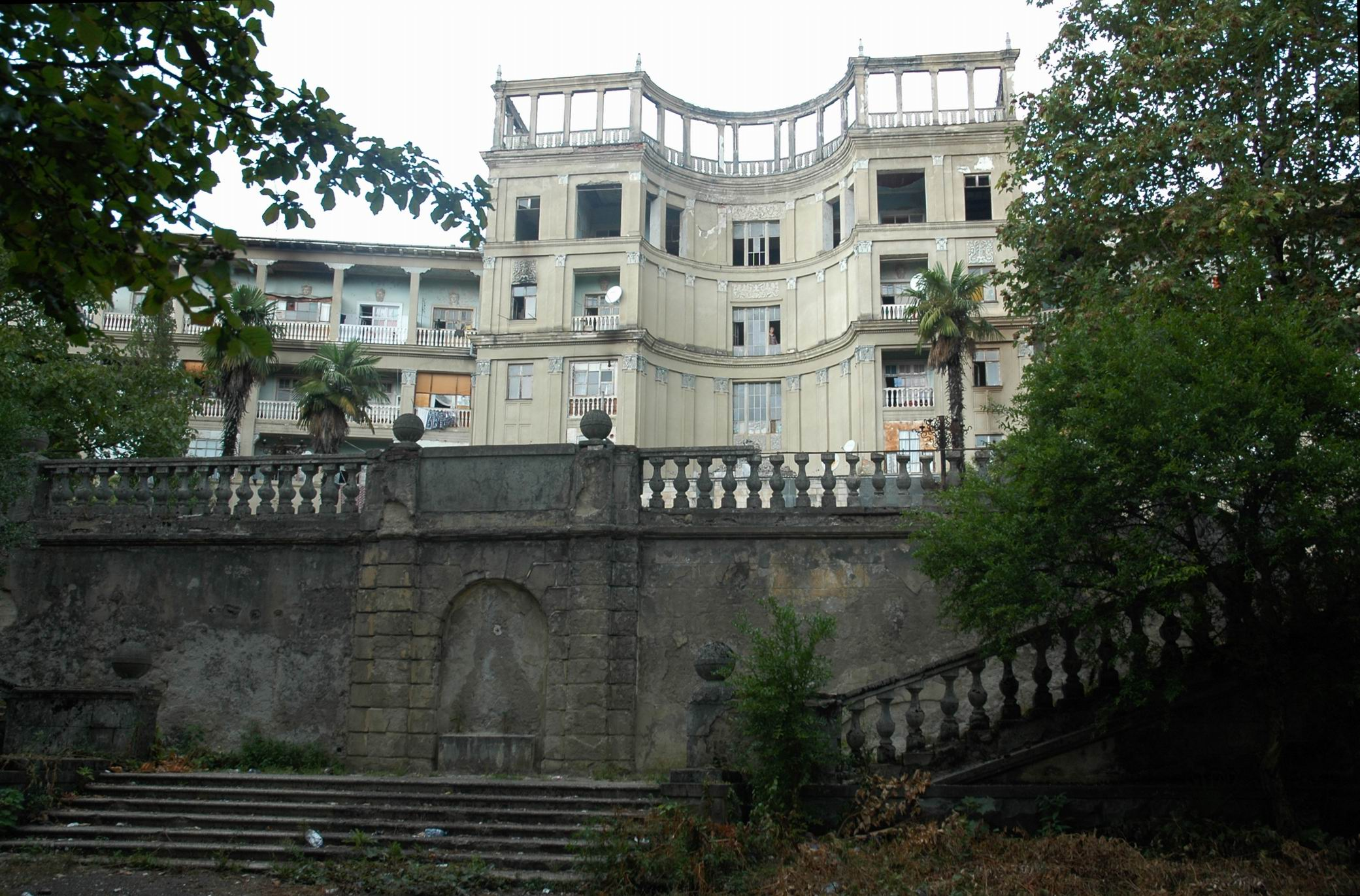
Tbilisi Sanatorium

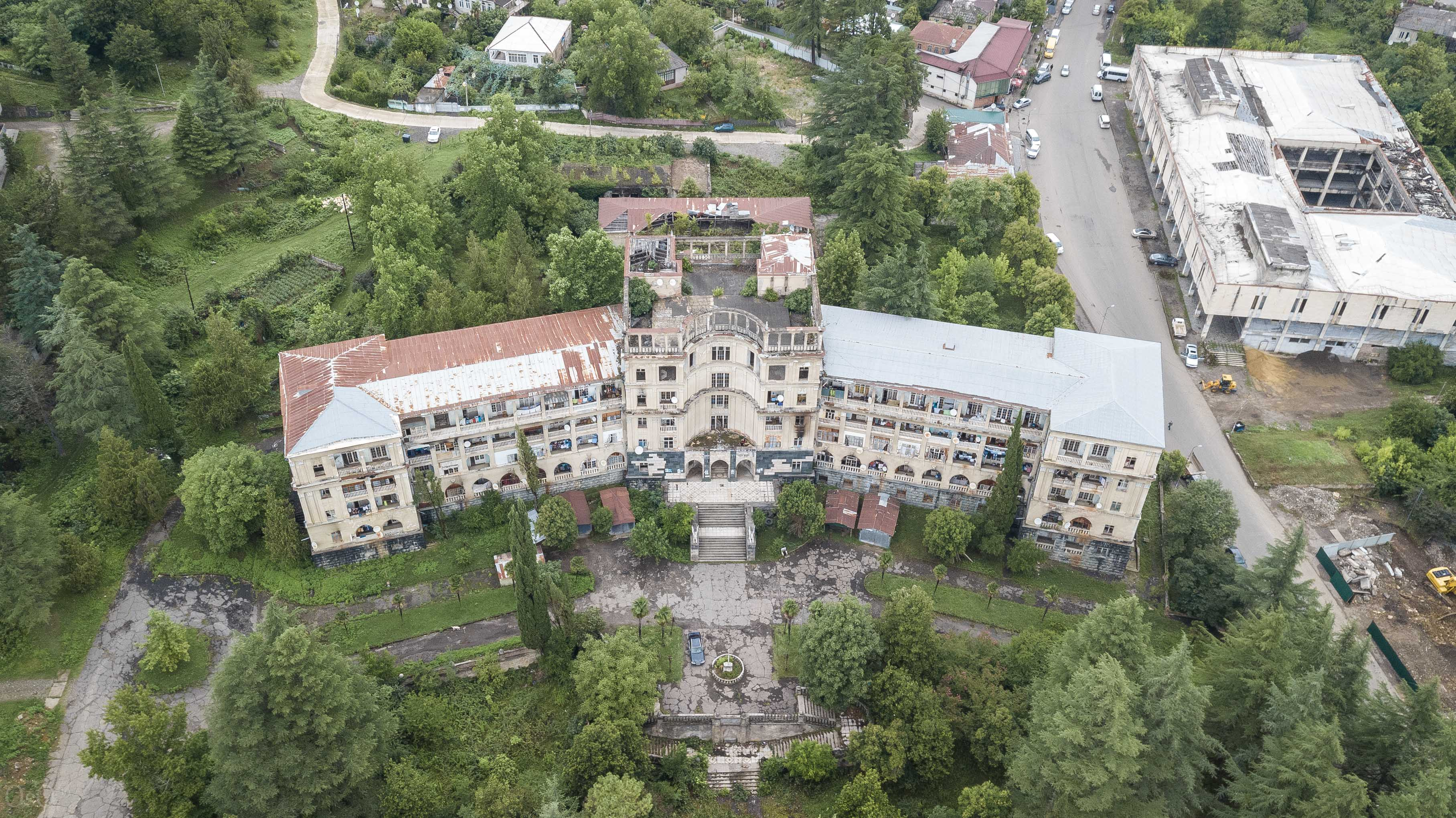
Tbilisi Sanatorium

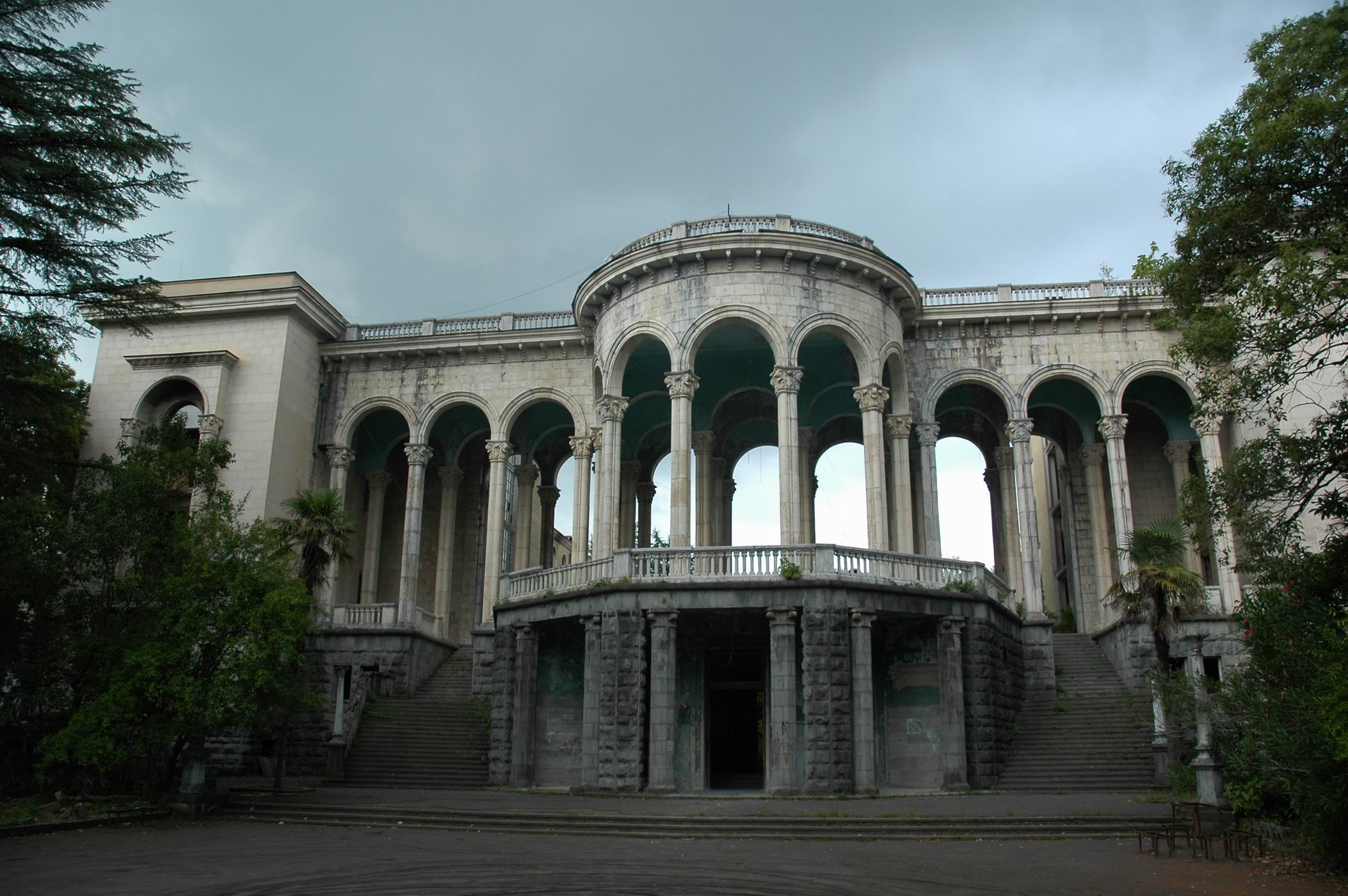
The Central Union of the Union of Soviet Socialist Republics' Medea Sanatorium (a.k.a. Centrosoyuz)

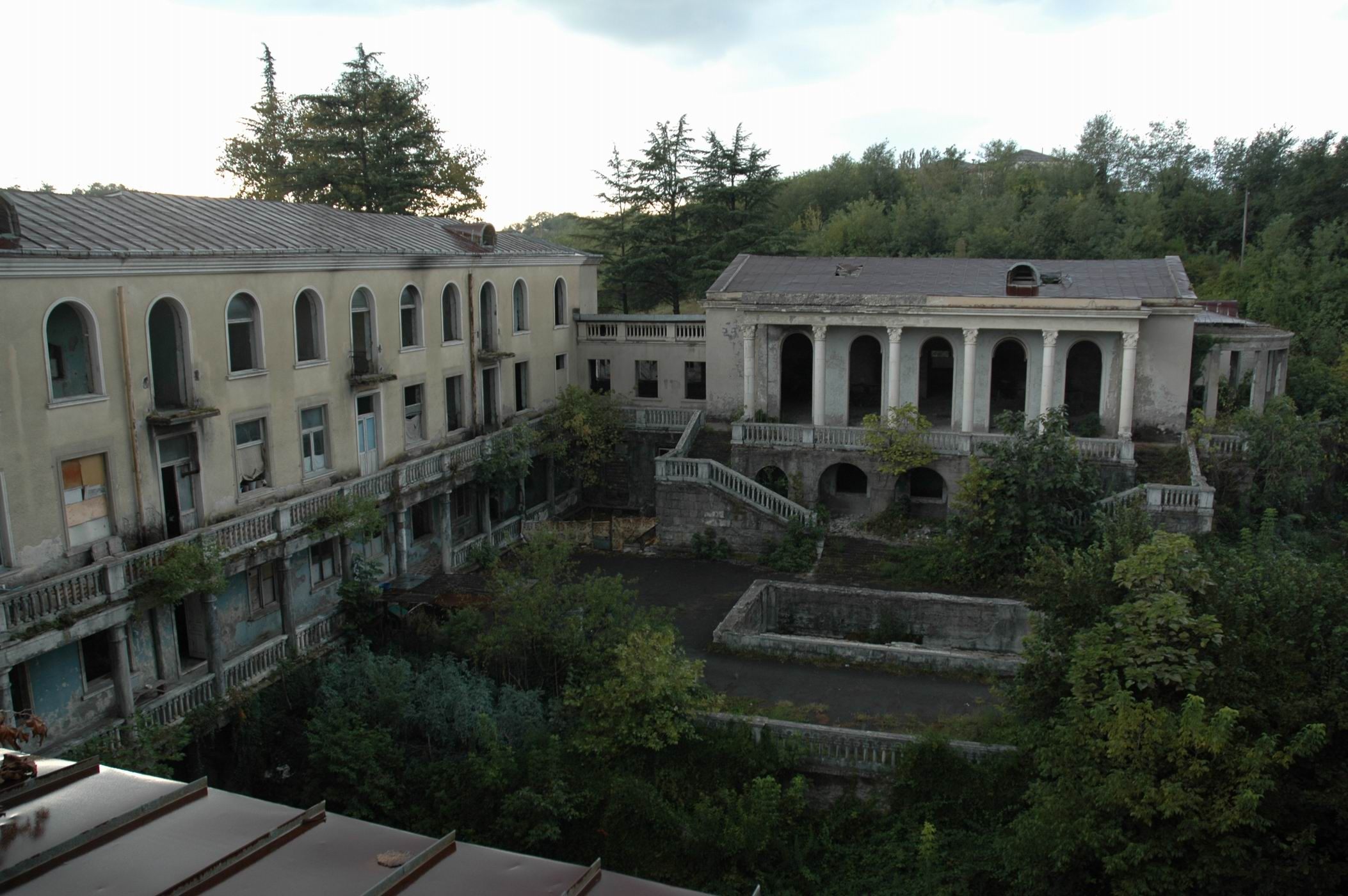
The Central Union of the Union of Soviet Socialist Republics' Medea Sanatorium (a.k.a Centrosoyuz)

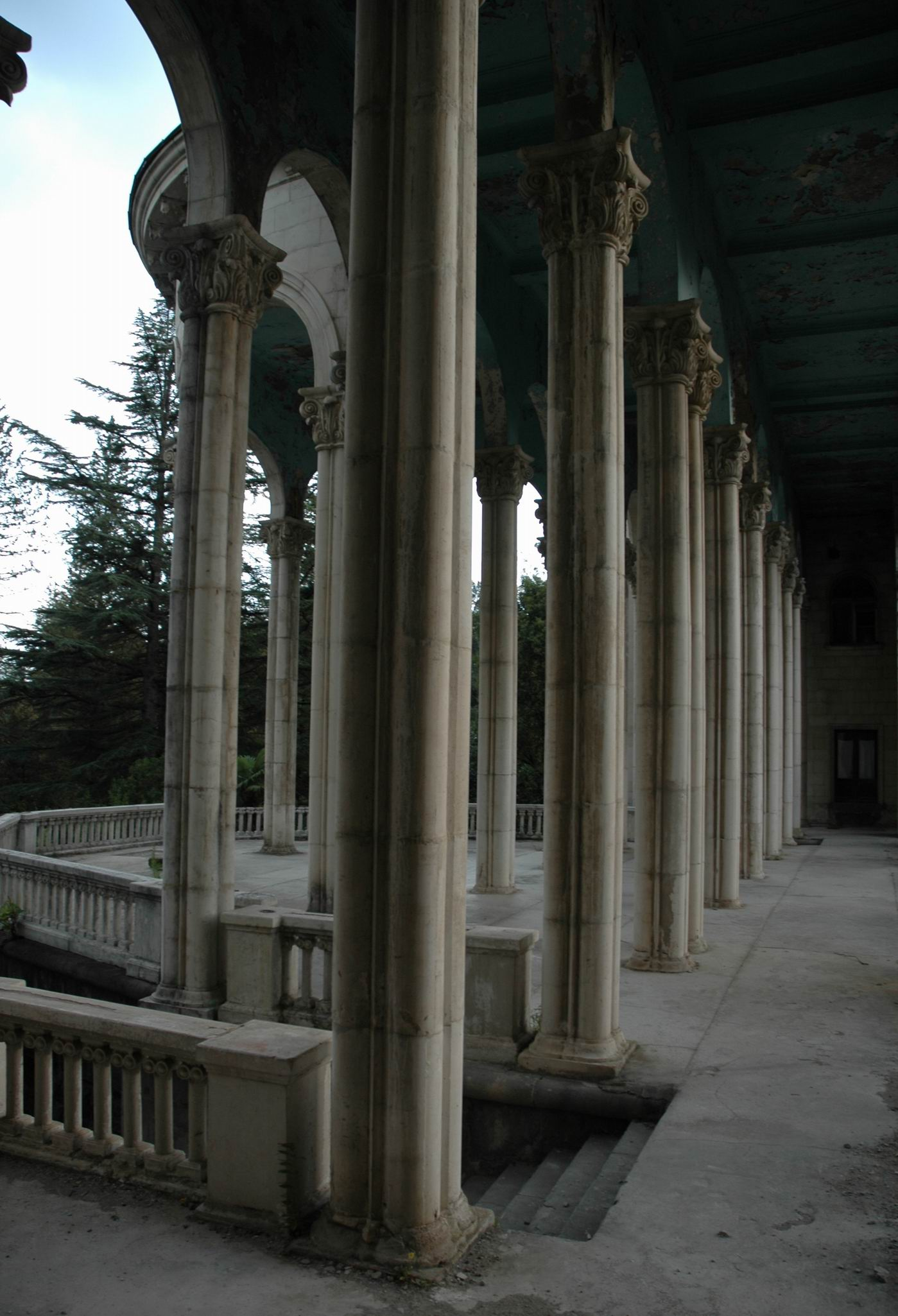
Centrosoyuz Sanatorium

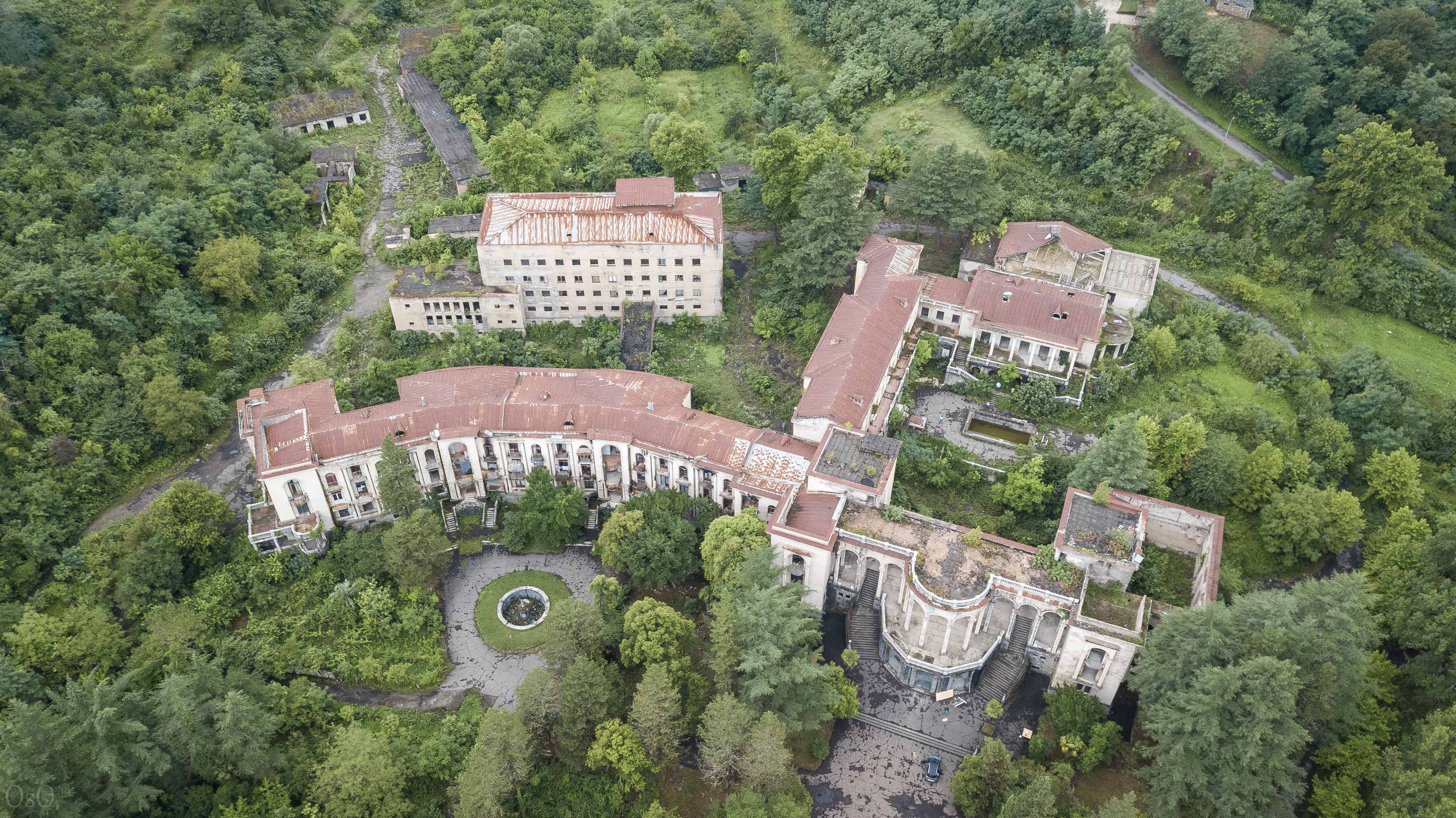
The Central Union of the Union of Soviet Socialist Republics' Medea Sanatorium (a.k.a Centrosoyuz)

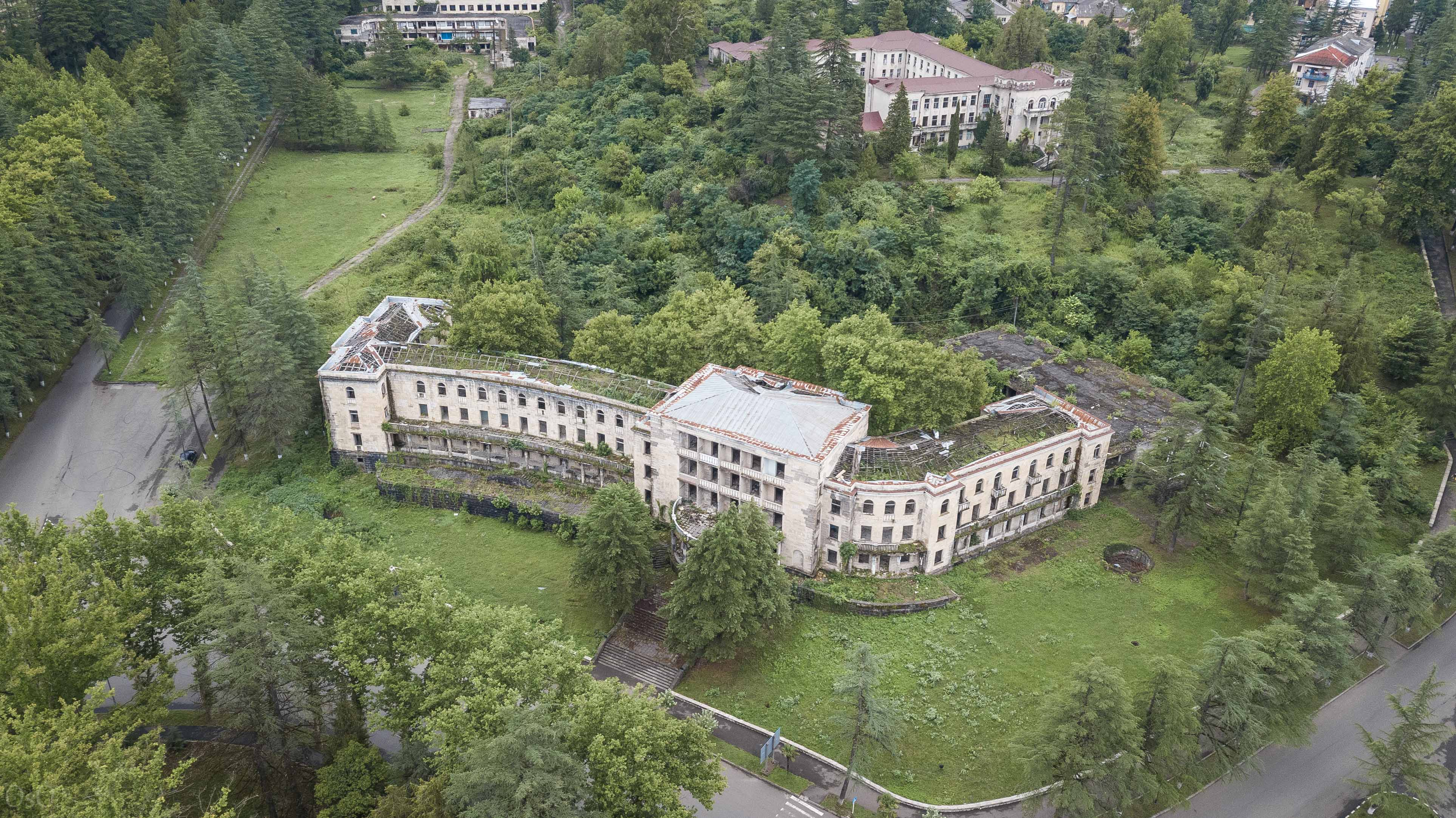
Savane boarding house

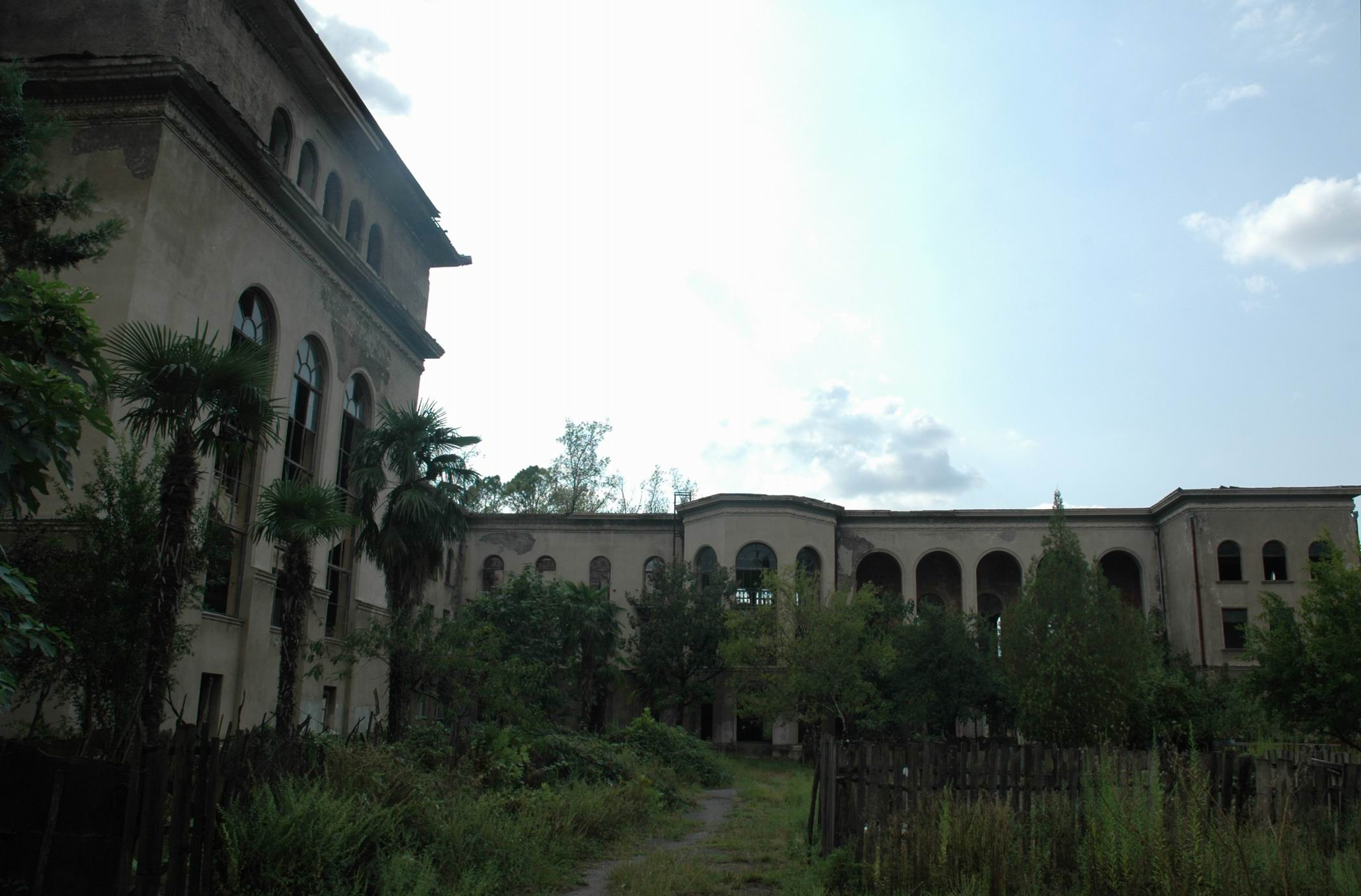
Imereti Sanatorium

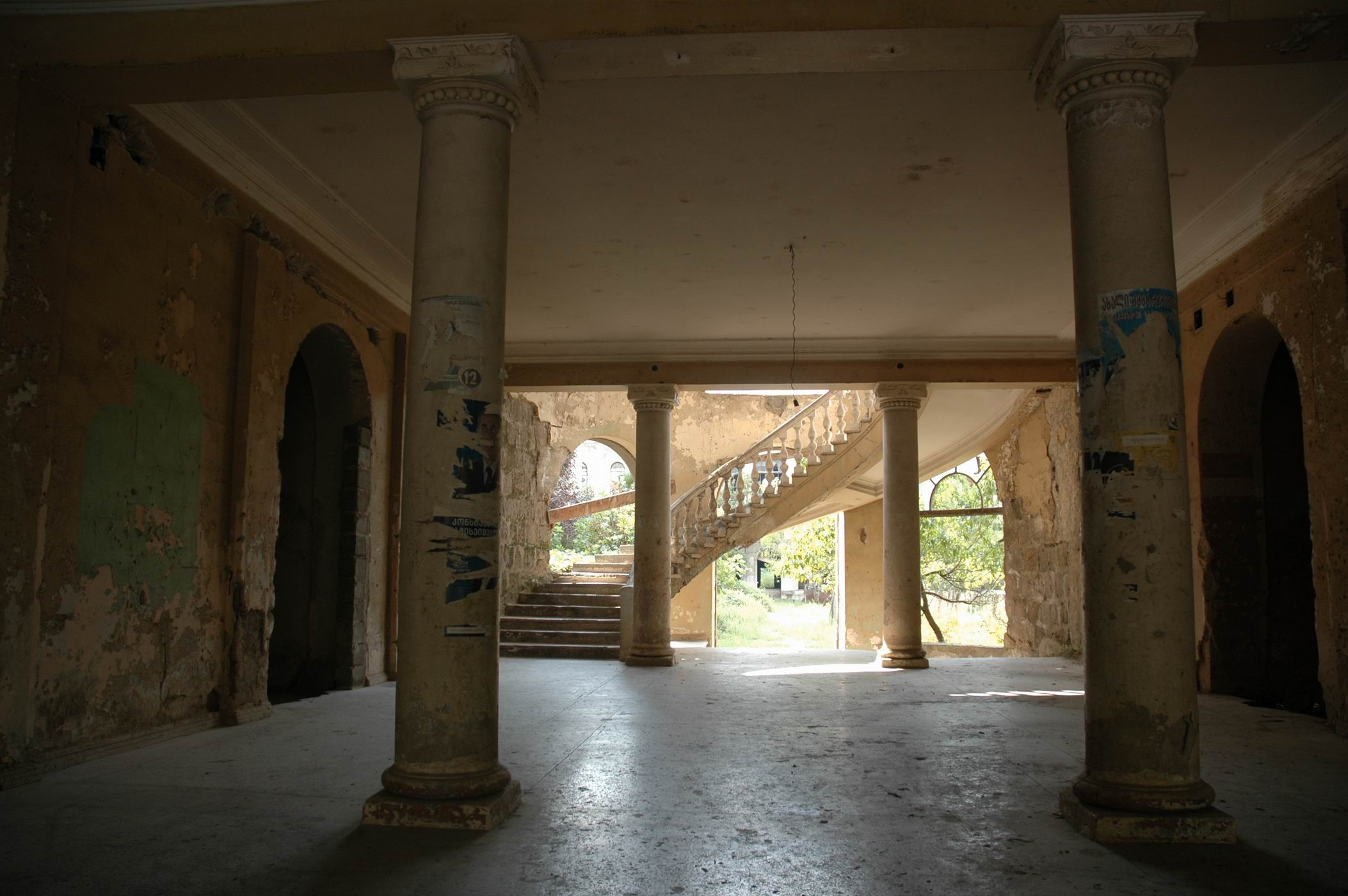
Imereti Sanatorium

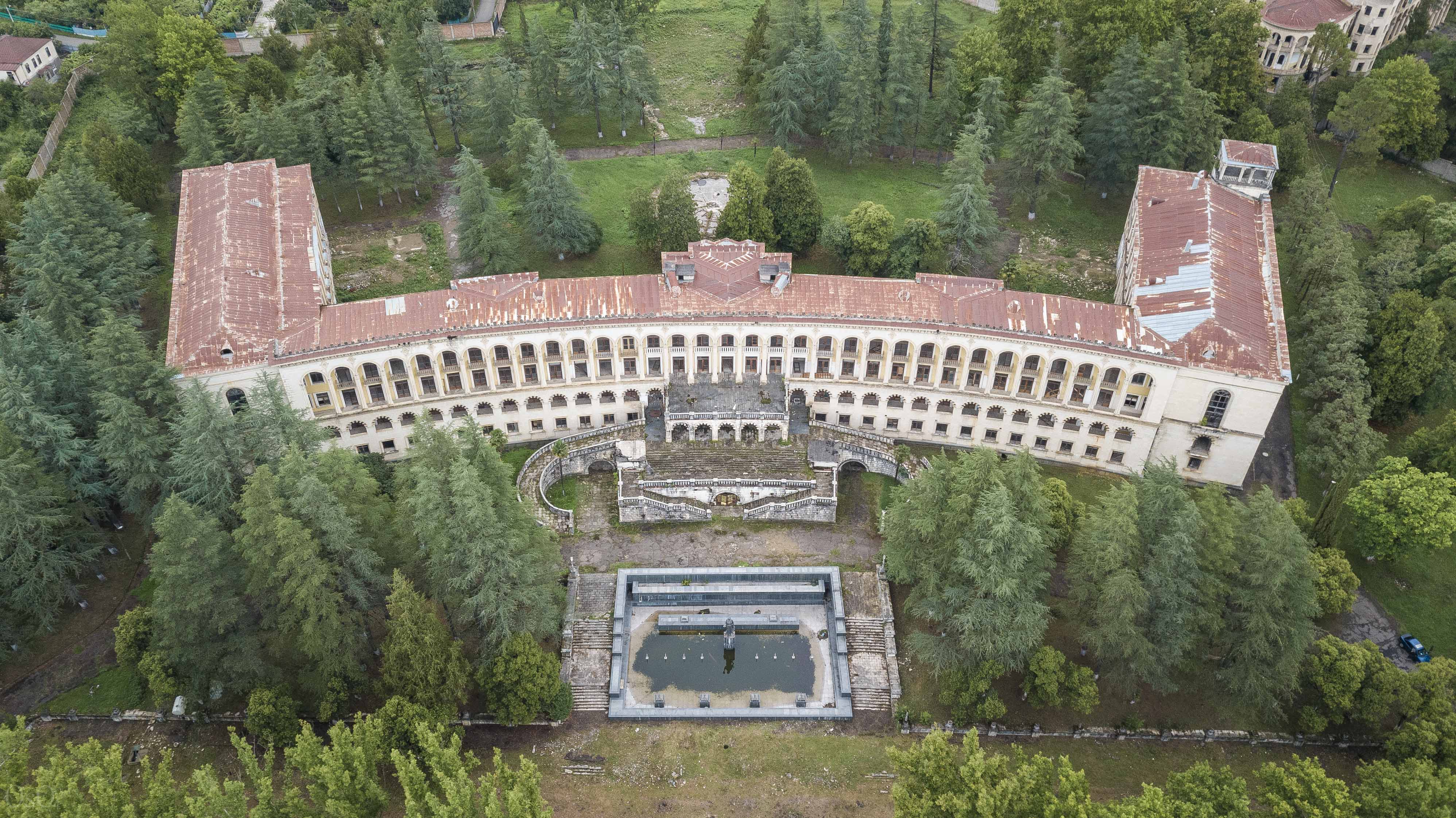
Meshakhte Sanatorium

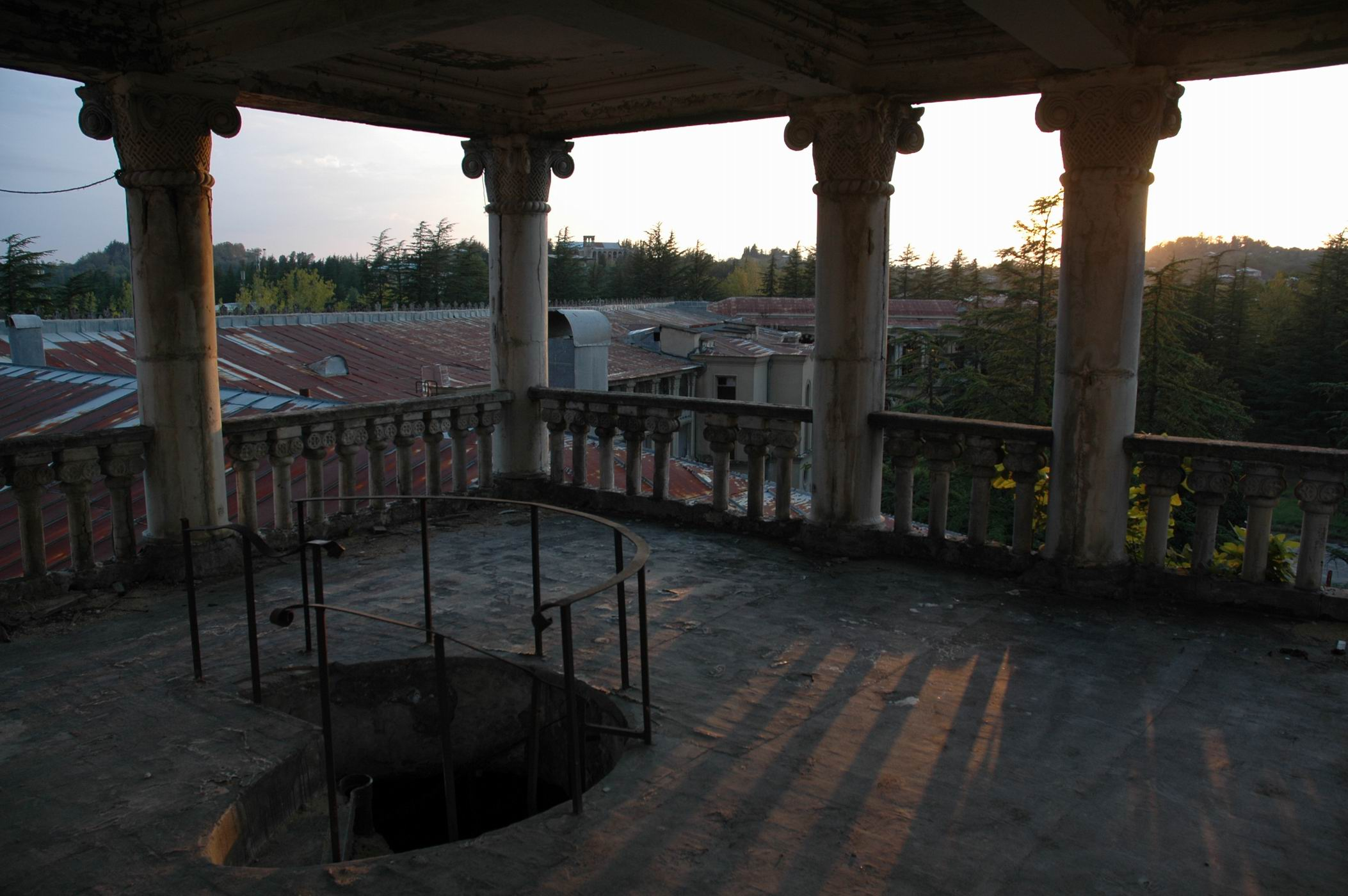
Meshakhte Sanatorium

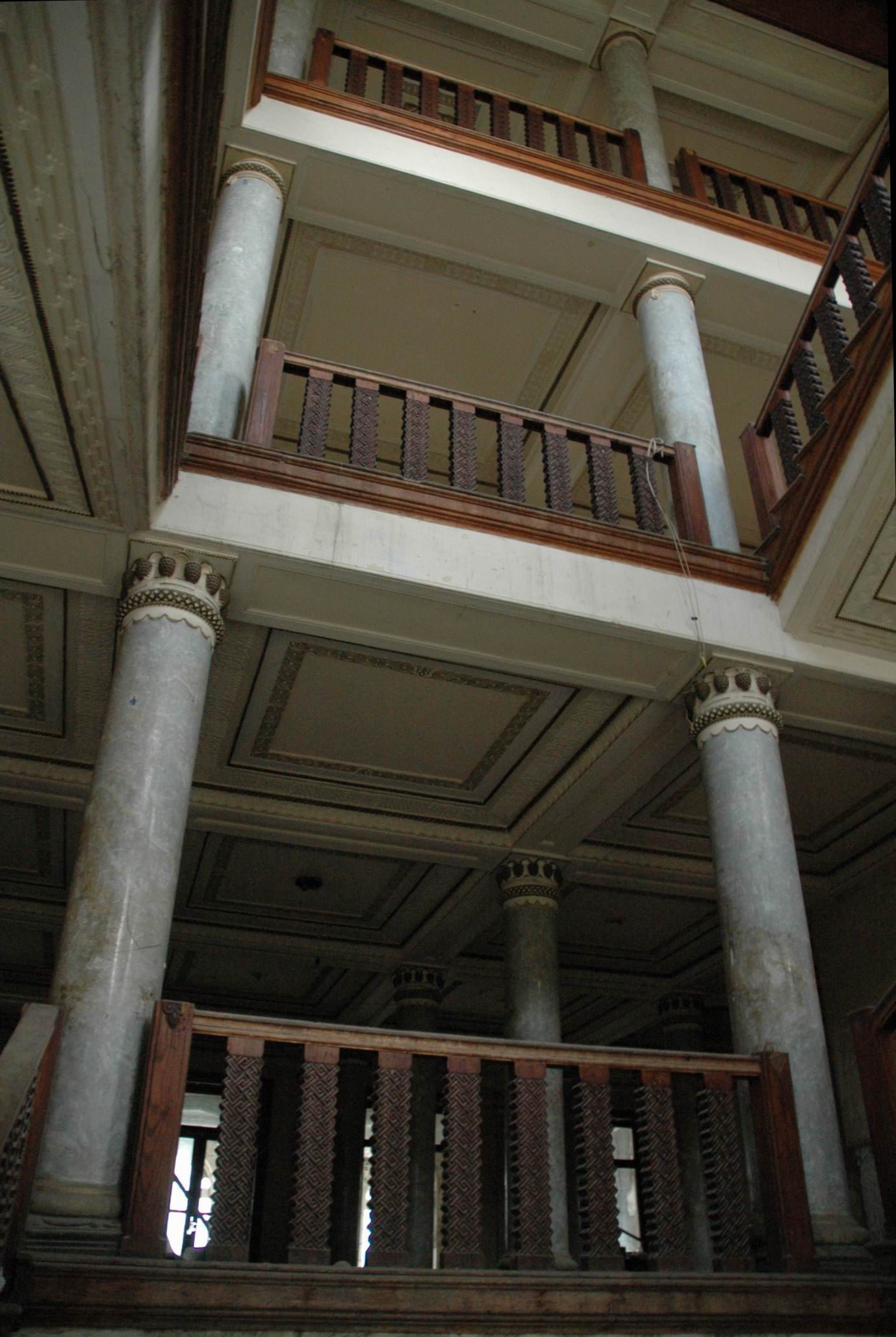
Meshakhte Sanatorium

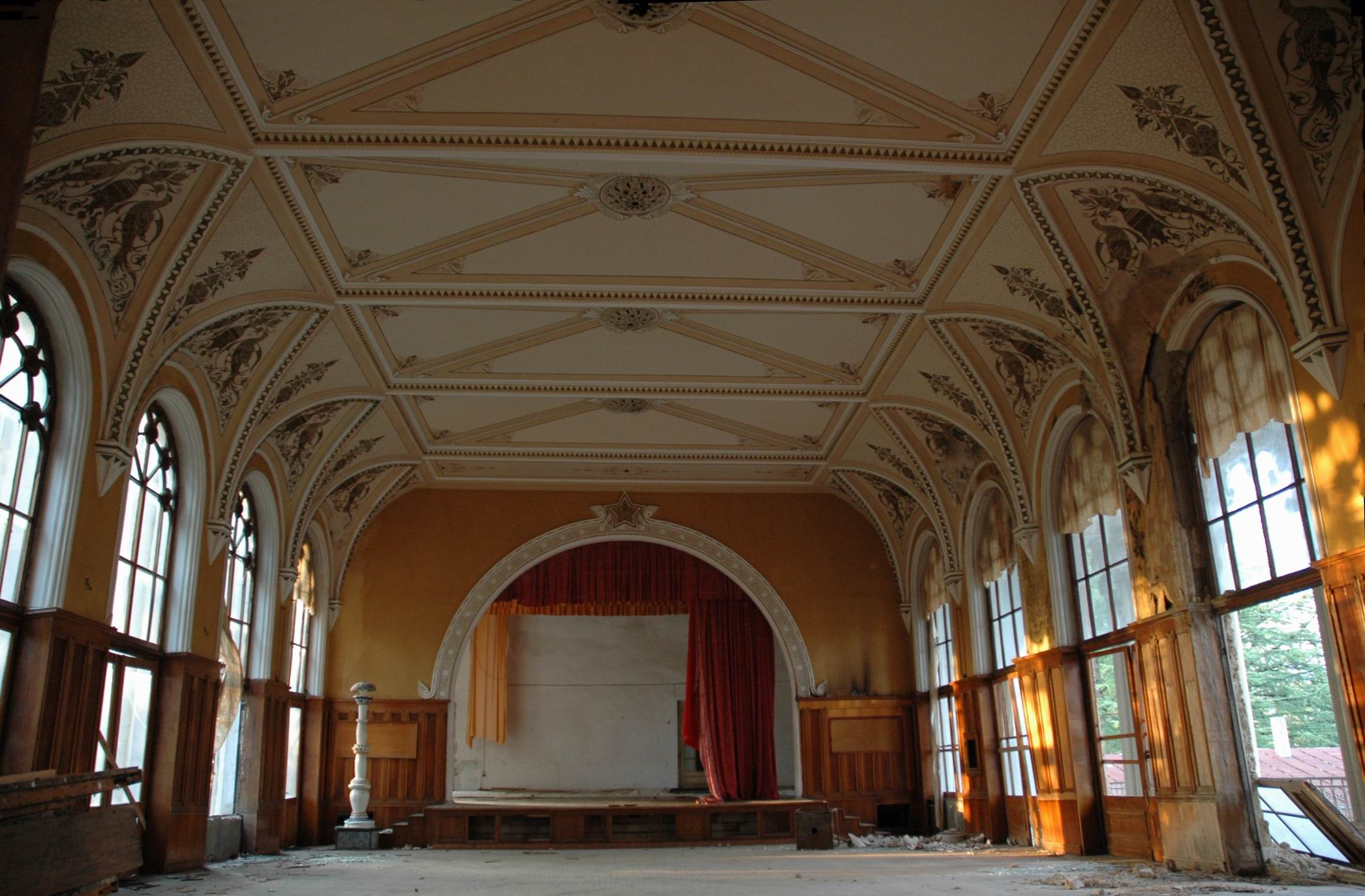
Meshakhte Sanatorium

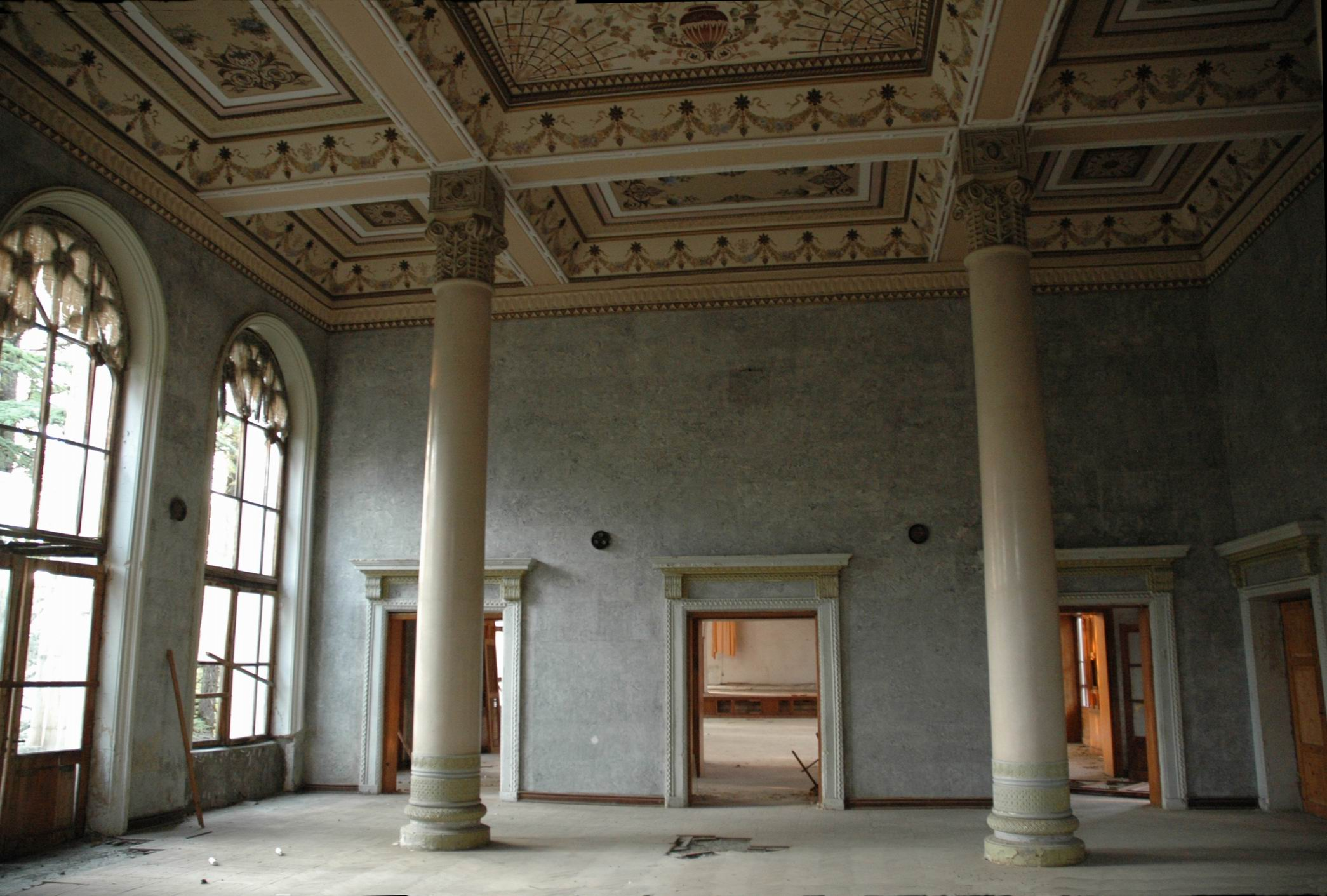
Meshakhte Sanatorium

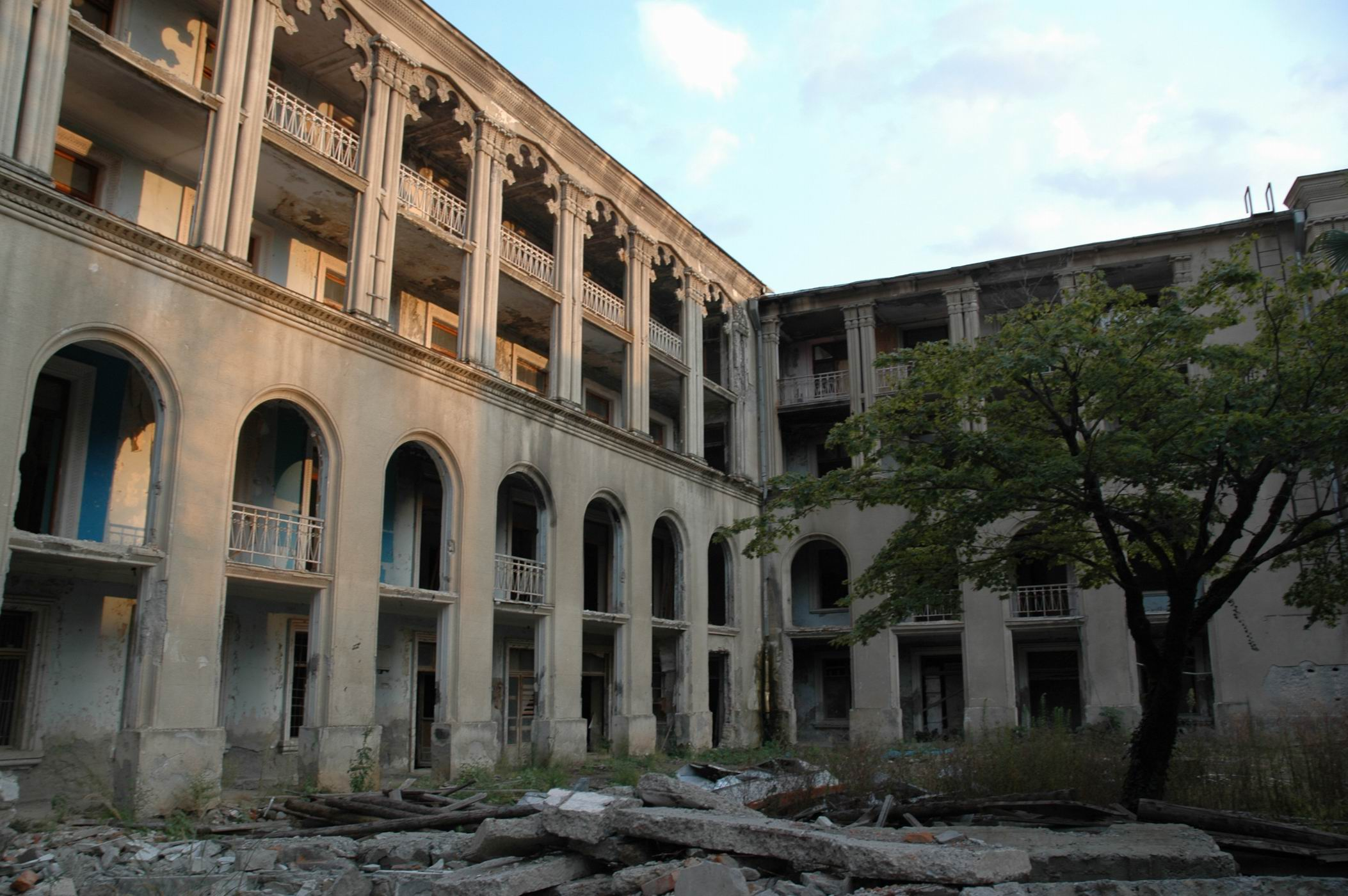
Meshakhte Sanatorium

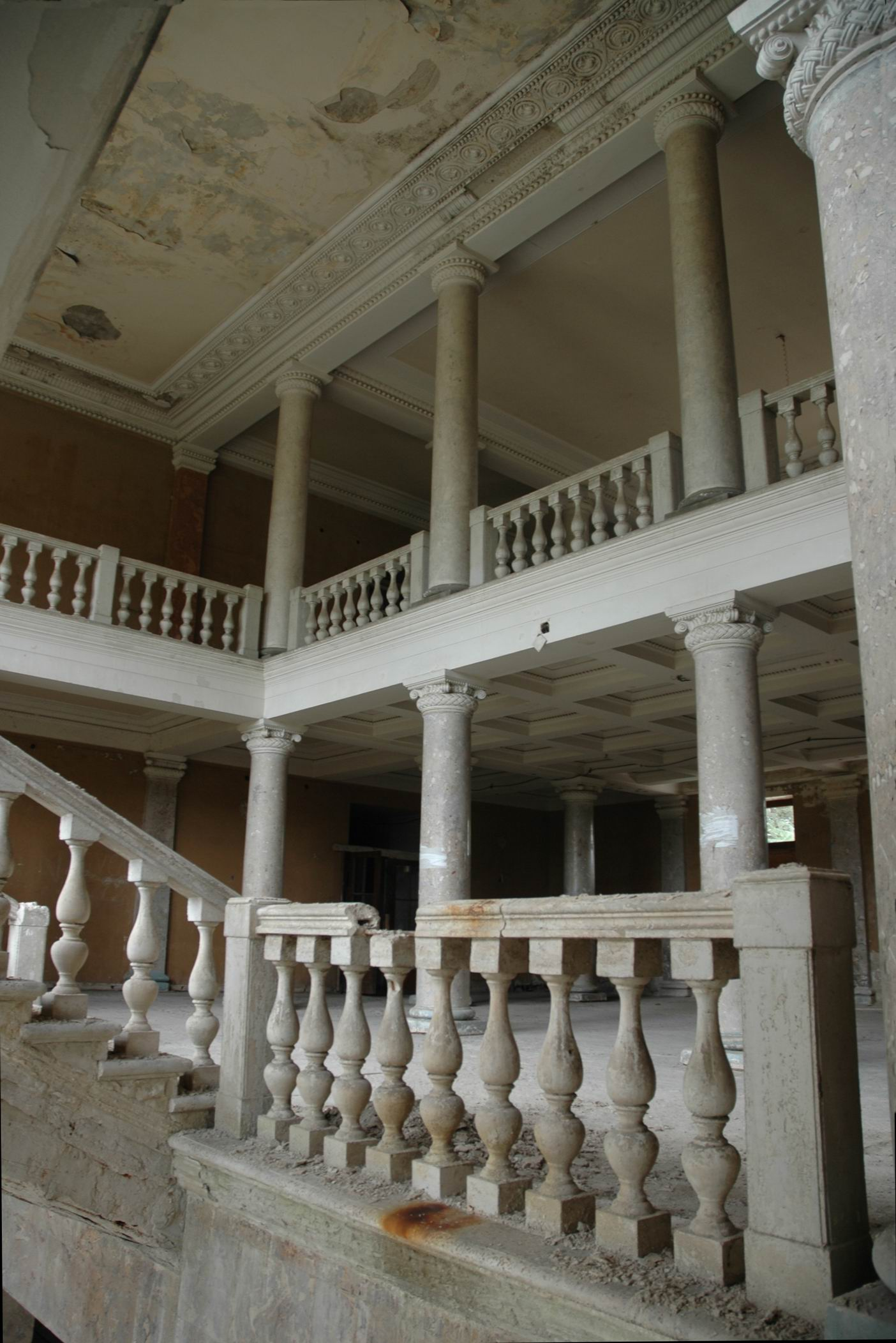
Imereti Sanatorium

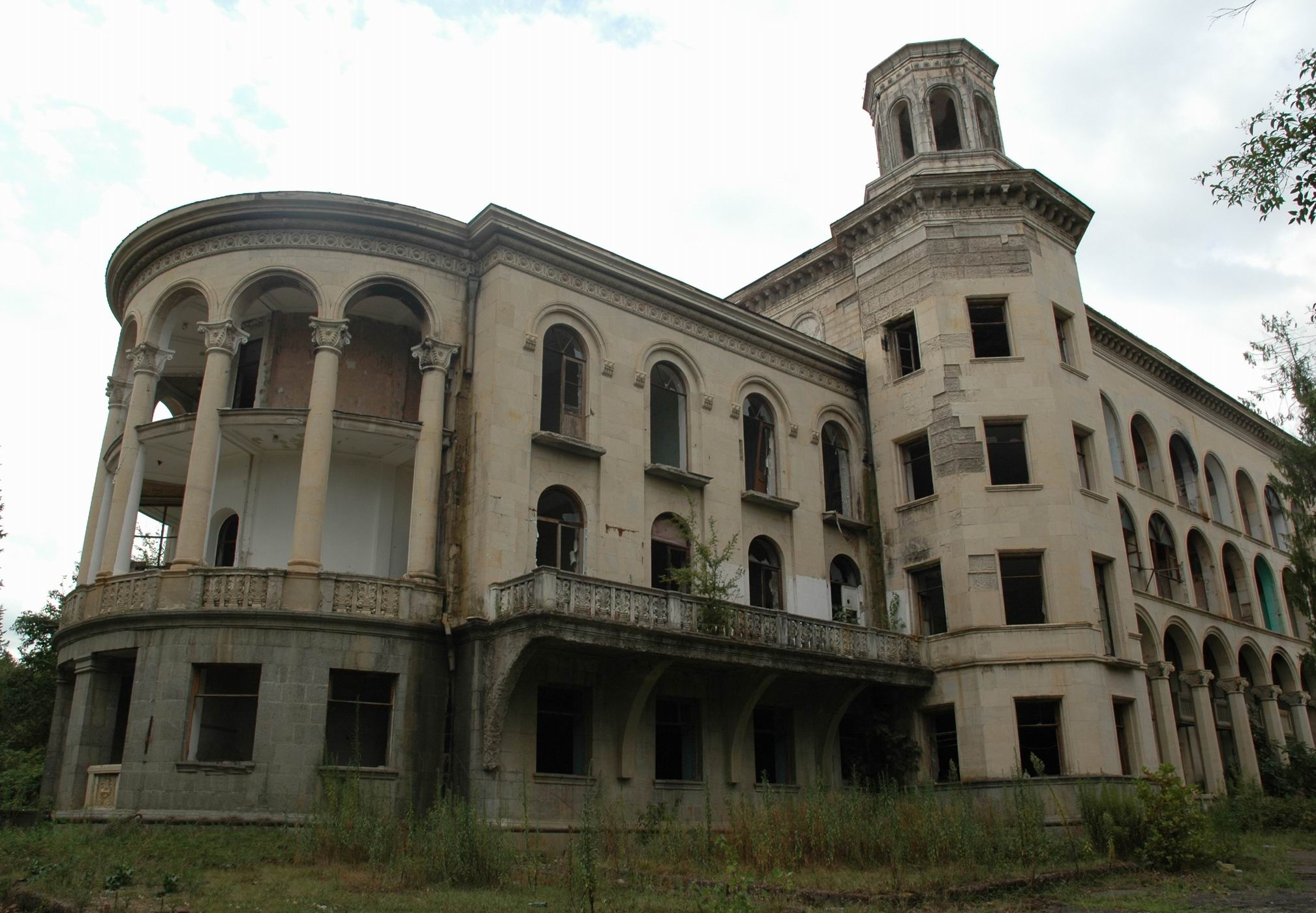
Iveria Sanatorium

== See also ==
- Imereti
- Tkvarcheli
