= Tsqaltubo Municipality =

Coordinates: 42°20′23″N 42°35′57″E

Tskaltubo Municipality წყალტუბოს მუნიციპალიტეტი
- Municipality
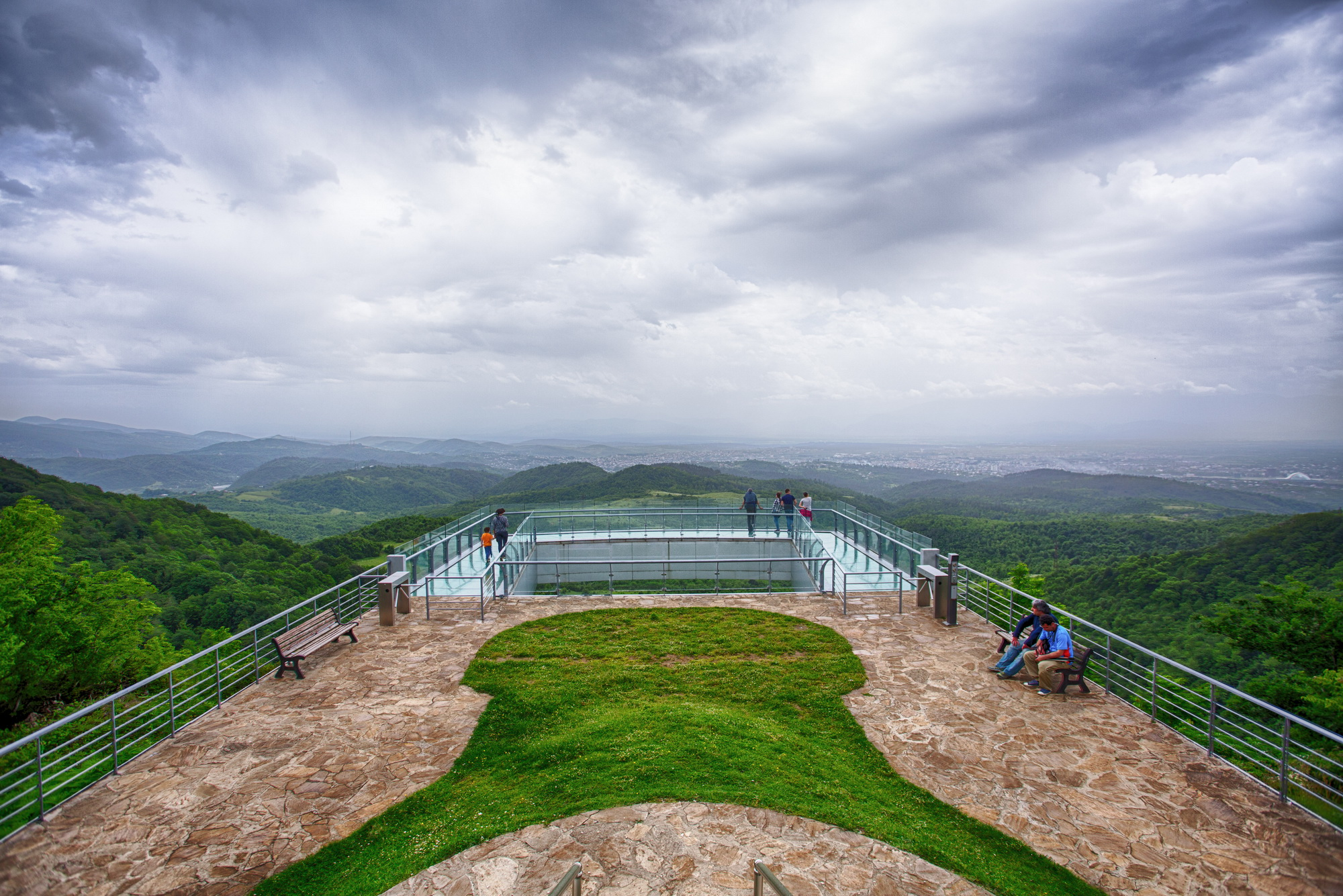
- Sataplia Managed Reserve

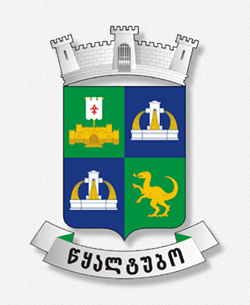
- Flag Seal

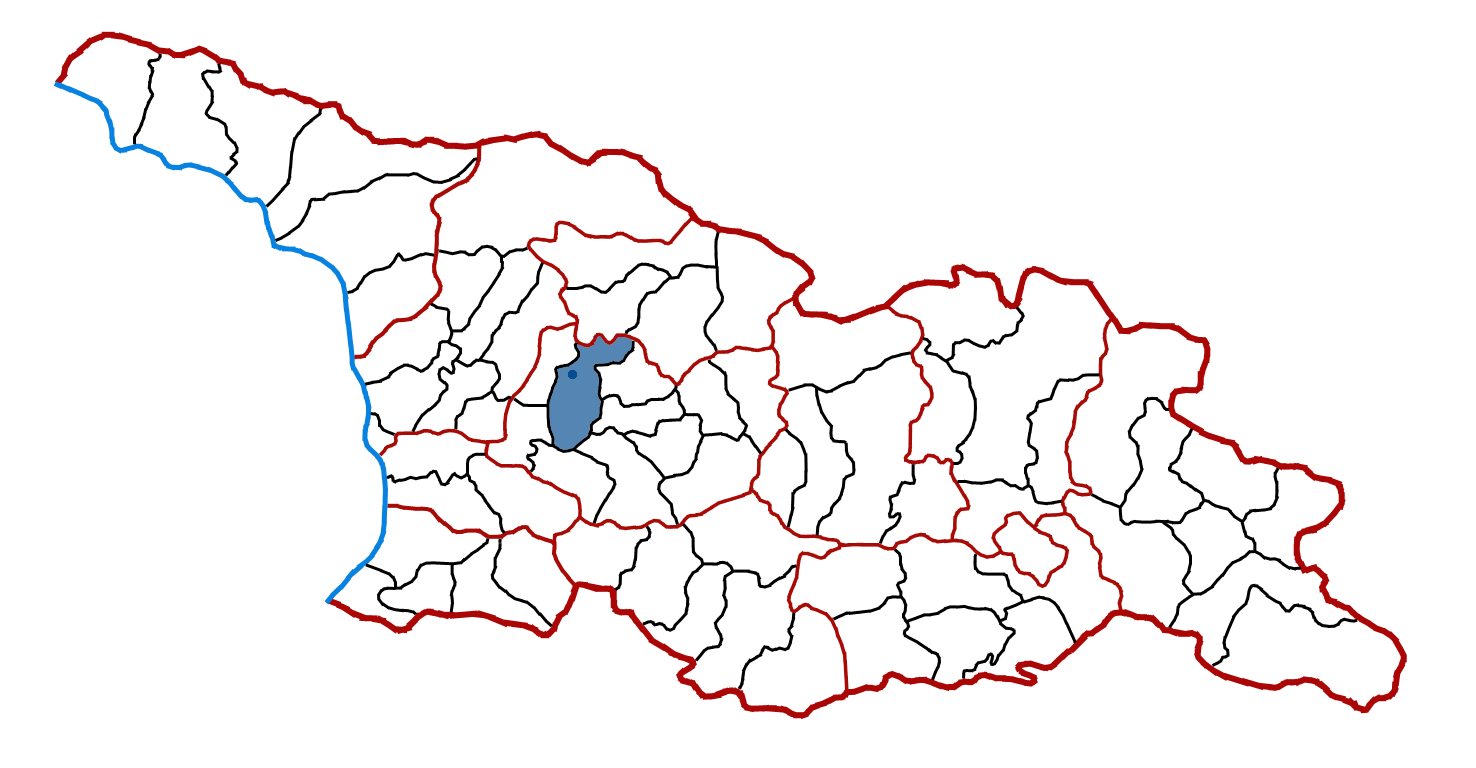
- Location of the municipality within Georgia
- Country: Georgia
- Region: Imereti
- Capital: Tsqaltubo

Government
  - Type: Mayor–Council
  - Body: Tsqaltubo Municipal Assembly
  - mayor: Grigol Ioseliani (GD)

Area
  - Total: 707.5 km^{2} (273.2 sq mi)

Population (2014)
  - Total: 56,883
  - Density: 80.4/km^{2} (208/sq mi)

Population by ethnicity
  - Georgians: 99.5 %
  - Russians: 0.26 %
  - Others: 0.24 %
- Time zone: UTC+4 (Georgian Standard Time)
- Website: tskaltubo.gov.ge

Tskaltubo (Georgian: წყალტუბოს მუნიციპალიტეტი) is a district of Georgia, in the region of Imereti. Its main town is Tskaltubo.

Tskaltubo Municipality is a self-governing unit in the Imereti region. People still lived on its territory during the Stone Age, which is confirmed by the numerous settlements discovered during the excavations. The earliest weapon in the Caucasus is found in the White Cave - a copper arrowhead dating back to the 4th-5th millennium BC. It became an official balneological resort in 1920, and was granted the status of a city in 1953.

Located in the central part of Imereti. The municipality is bordered by the city of Kutaisi to the east, Samtredia and Khoni to the west, and Baghdati and Vani to the south. The defining physical-geographical factor of the relief is the deep oval shape of the depression with the appearance of hollow mineral springs, which are bordered on each side by mountain passes. The main forms of relief are lowland-hilly. Rivers flow in the territory of Tskaltubo: Gubistskali, Tskaltubo.

There are 48 settlements in Tskaltubo: 1 city, 47 villages.

== Geography and climate ==
Tskaltubo municipality is located east of the Kolkheti lowlands, in the gorge of the rivers Rioni and Gubistskali, in the Imereti region. Its administrative center is the city of Tskaltubo. The municipality includes the following administrative units: Tskaltubo, Gvishtibi, Gumbra, Dgnorisa, Maglaki, Mekvena, Mukhiani, Opurchkheti, Opshkviti, Patriketi, Rioni, Sakulia, Partskhanakanebi, Kvitiri, Tskhunkuri, the village of Tskaltubo and Geguti. It is bordered by the city of Kutaisi to the east, Samtredia and Khoni to the west, Tsageri and Ambrolauri to the north, and Baghdati and Vani to the south. The main river of Tskaltubo is Rioni with its tributaries, Tskaltubostskali and Gubistskali. There is Tavshava Lake and an artificially created Cold Lake on the territory of the municipality.

Tskaltubo municipality has a humid subtropical climate with short winters and hot summers. Tskaltubo is one of the warmest places in Georgia in terms of air temperature. Average annual temperature is 15 °C (59 °F). The average temperature in August is 28 to 30 °C (82 to 86 °F), and in January–February 5 °C (41 °F).

== Politics ==
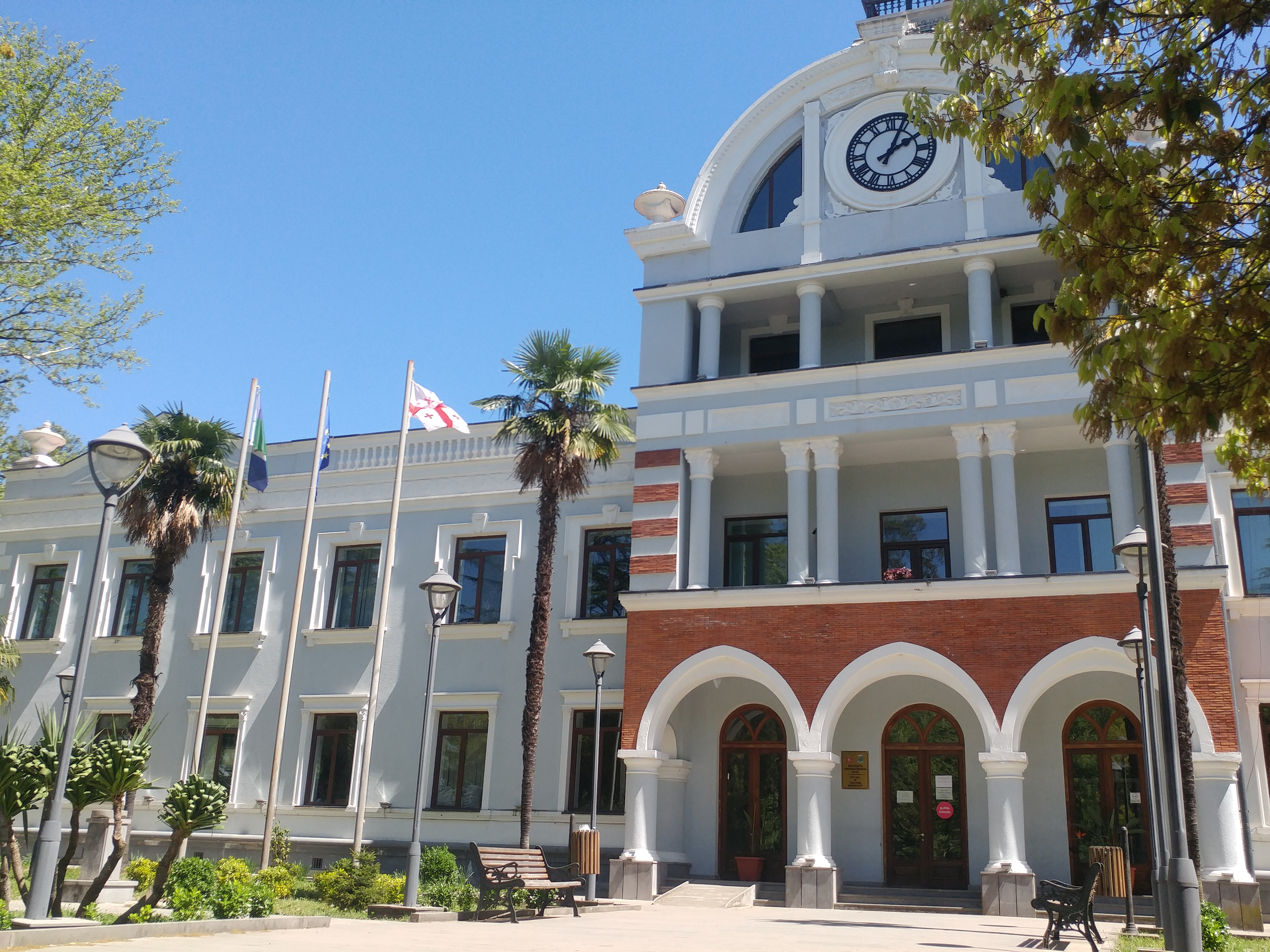
Tskaltubo City Hall

Tsqaltubo Municipal Assembly (Georgian: წყალტუბოს საკრებულო) is a representative body in Tsqaltubo Municipality. currently consisting of 39 members. The council is assembles into session regularly, to consider subject matters such as code changes, utilities, taxes, city budget, oversight of city government and more. Tsqaltubo sakrebulo is elected every four year. The last election was held in October 2021.

Party	2017	2021	Current Municipal Assembly
Georgian Dream	25	25	
United National Movement	5	13	
For Georgia		1	
European Georgia	2		
Total	32	39	

== Economy ==
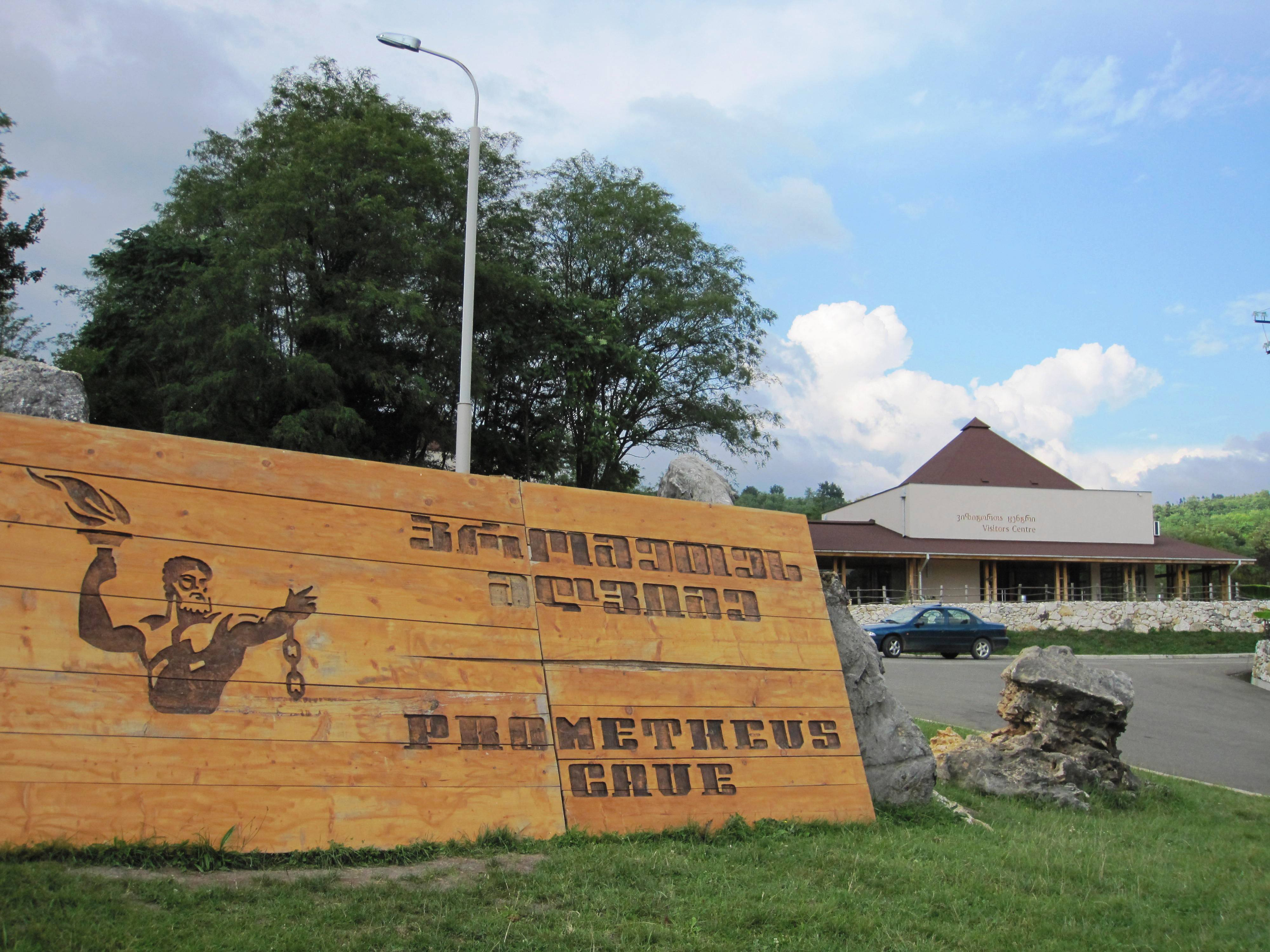
Prometheus Cave visitors center.

The leading sector of the economy of the municipality is tourism. A special role is played by the resort Tskaltubo, which is famous for its healing thermal waters. Agriculture mainly develops horticulture, fruit growing and grain production. The main transport hub of the municipality is the city of Tskaltubo, which is connected by roads to the cities: Kutaisi, Khoni, Tsageri, Tkibuli. The city is connected to Kutaisi by railway. Tskaltubo is a multifunctional, world-famous balneological resort, an important resource for the economy is the unique radon-containing water, which has always attracted tourists. Tskaltubo is interesting for tourists due to the underground beauty of the karst caves "Sataplia" and "Prometheus" and the factors characteristic of medicinal speleo tourism.

== Education and culture ==
5740 students study in 40 public and 2 private schools and 23 kindergartens in Tskaltubo municipality. There are 24 libraries, most of the rural libraries are equipped with computer equipment. More than 35 thousand exhibits are preserved in the funds of Tskaltubo museums. Tskaltubo Museum of Local Lore keeps archeology, numismatics, art, manuscripts, epigraphy, photo archival materials. Writer Niko Lortkipanidze House-Museum in the village of Chuneshi presents photos and documentary material reflecting the life and work of the writer. Academician Giorgi Akhvlediani House-Museum in the village of Derchi - where the personal belongings of a great scientist are kept.

== Twin towns – sister Municipalities ==
- Kirovsk, Ukraine
- Polotsk, Belarus
- Saldus, Latvia
- Truskavets, Ukraine

== Gallery ==
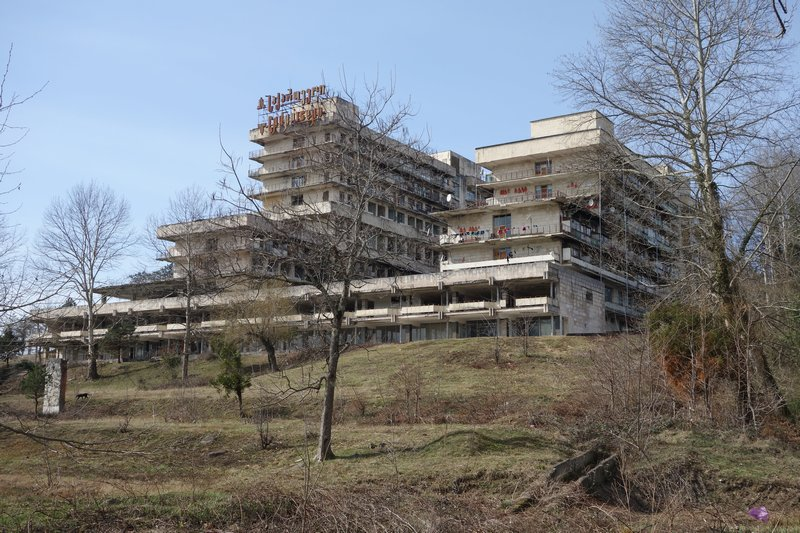
Hotel Sakartvelo

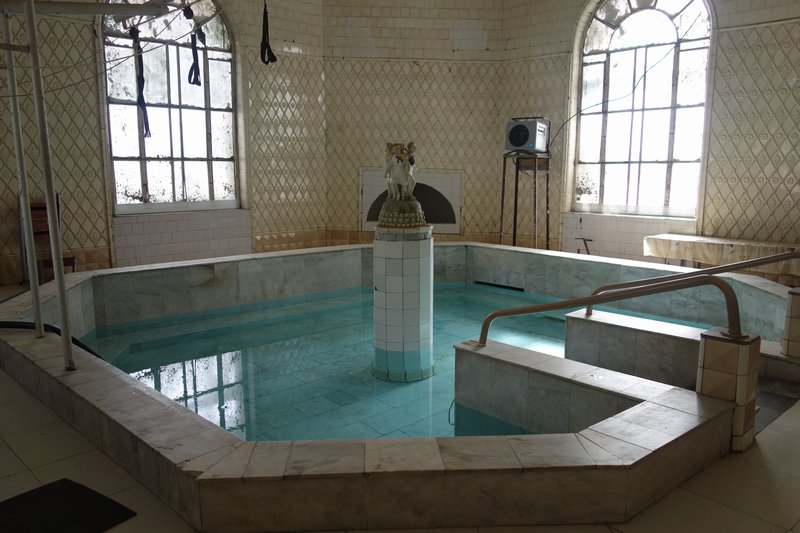
Tskaltubo Bathhouse

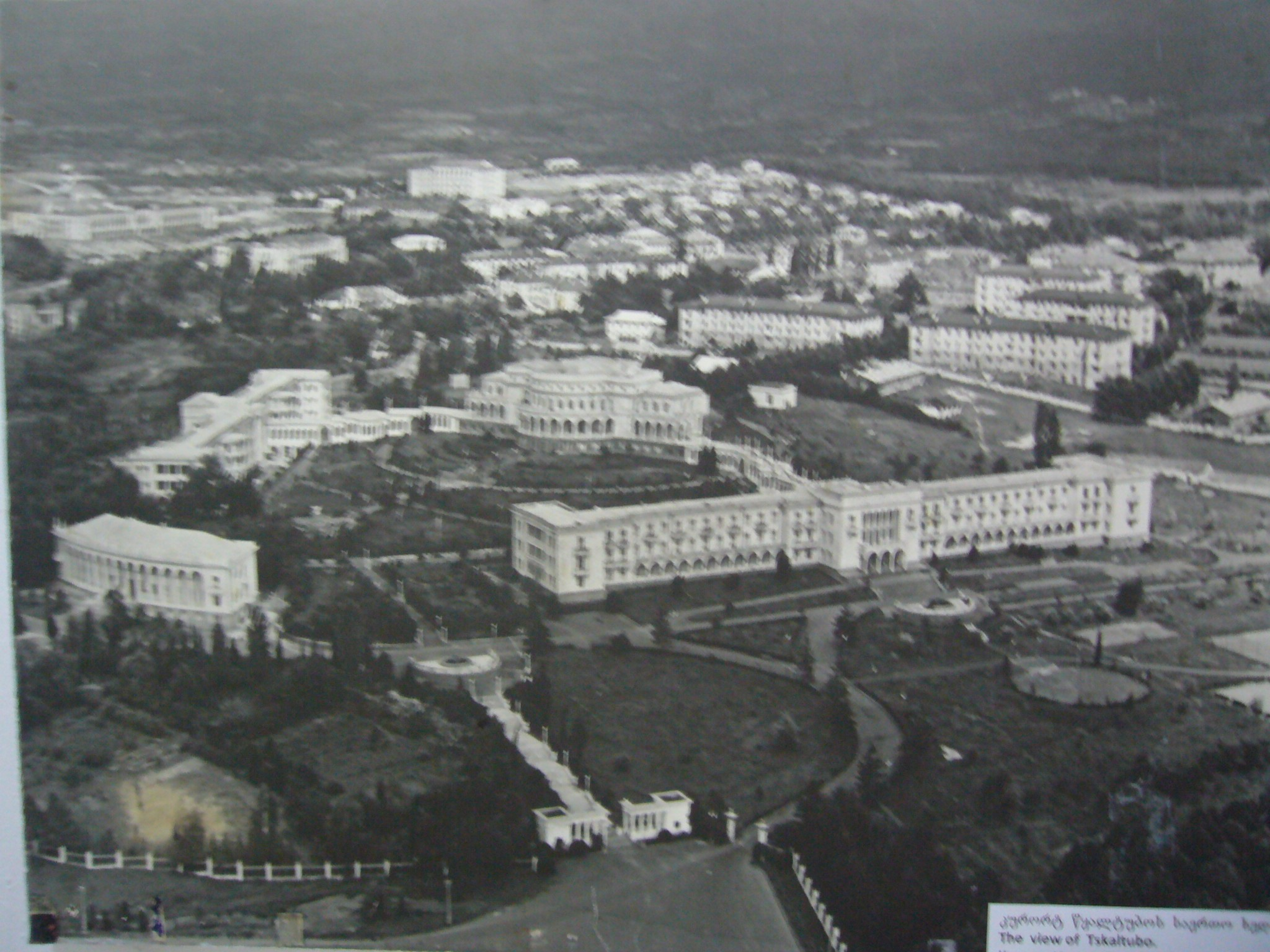
Hotel shaxtiori in the 1950s

== See also ==
- List of municipalities in Georgia (country)
