= Tusheti National Park =

National park in Georgia

- IUCN category II (national park)
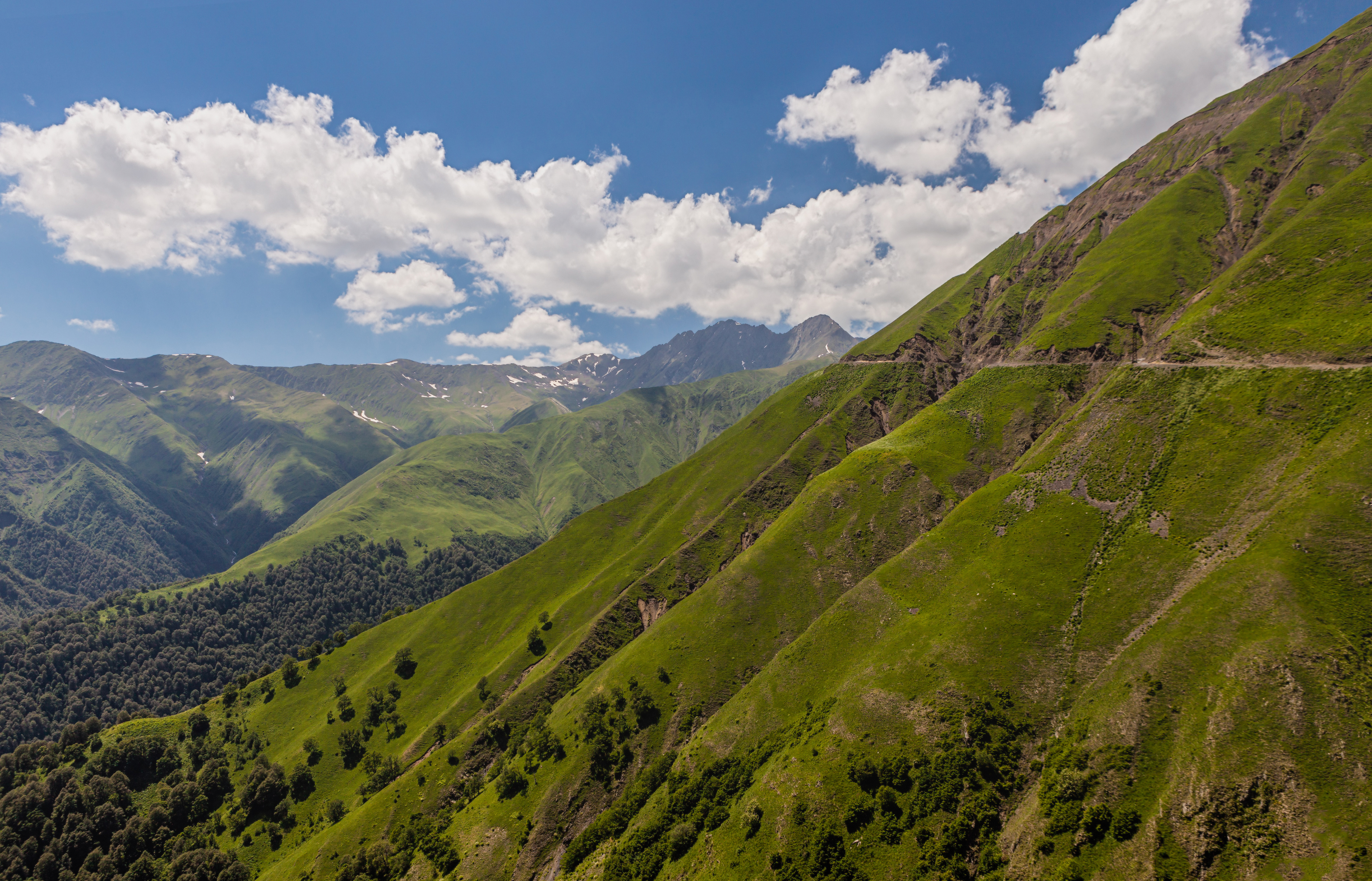
- Tusheti National Park

- Location within Georgia Location within Kakheti
- Interactive map of Tusheti National Park
- Location: Georgia
- Nearest city: Tusheti
- Coordinates: 42°24′36″N 45°29′13″E
- Area: 1,276.43 km^{2} (492.83 sq mi)
- Established: 2003
- Governing body: Agency of Protected Areas
- Website: apa.gov.ge/en/protected-areas/cattestone/tushetis-daculi-teritoriebis-administracia

The Tusheti National Park (Georgian: თუშეთის ეროვნული პარკი) in eastern Georgia is one of the eight new protected areas approved by Parliament of Georgia on 22 April 2003.

The Global Environment Facility (GEF) and the World Bank were part of this approval process under the "Georgia – Protected Areas Development Project". Plants conserved in the park are pine groves (Pinus sylvestris) and birch groves (Betula pubescens and Betula raddeana).

The Tusheti Protected Areas includes Tusheti National Park, Tusheti Protected Landscape and Tusheti Strict Nature Reserve with total protected area about 113,660.2 ha.

The key faunal species in the park are the Anatolian leopard (Panthera pardus ambornii), bear, chamois, falcon, golden eagle, lammergeyer, lynx, wild goat and wolf. The park was named one of the "12 best places you’ve never heard of" by BudgetTravel in 2011 not only for its rich biodiversity but also for its aesthetic terrain, hamlets, old defense towers, cuisine, and folk culture.

== Location ==
The park is set in the Tusheti Mountainous region in the north-eastern part of the country. It is 205 kilometres (127 mi) away from Tbilisi with the en route Alvani lying 120 kilometres (75 mi) away. Omalo-Alvani highway of 85 kilometres (53 mi) length is in a hilly terrain and is difficult to drive. The visitor center to the parks and reserves of Tusheti is located along the 85 kilometres (53 mi) of the main watershed ridge of Caucasus in lower Omalo. Its ecoregion is that of the Caucasus mixed forests.

== Features ==
The park has an approved land area of 83,453 hectares (206,220 acres), which lies within an elevation range of 900–4,800 metres (3,000–15,700 ft). The main functions of the park administration are to provide protection and conserve the flora and fauna of the park concurrently supporting the interests of the 50 nomadic communities, and achieving conservation of the linked historic monuments; and also to encourage eco-tourism.

For the endangered wild goat (Capra aegagrus) the park is the only intact habitat. To protect this species from poaching and enable its viewing in the park by visitors, the Centre for Biodiversity Conservation & Research (NACRES), an IUCN member, carried out a pilot project titled "viewing potential" by monitoring the "risks and benefits to conservation and the cost of setting up and operation of wildlife viewing trails". The local partners associated with this study were Tusheti Guide and Friends of Tusheti Protected Areas. A wild goat monitoring scheme was established, and local guides, park rangers and local groups were trained to ensure protection to the wild goat. The project has proved successful as more visitors could view the goat now, and NACRES is continuing its support.

== Fauna ==
In Tusheti National Park, there are seven mammals, ten birds and one fish which are on the Georgia Red List. Mammals are represented by otter, brown bear, wild goat, tur, deer and barbastelle. Birds, including some rare species, are common in the park. They include the imperial eagle, greater spotted eagle, lesser kestrel, corncrake, steppe eagle, black kite, vulture, Montagu's harrier, Caucasian grouse and Caucasian snowcock. Trout is the only one species of fish on the list.

== Gallery ==
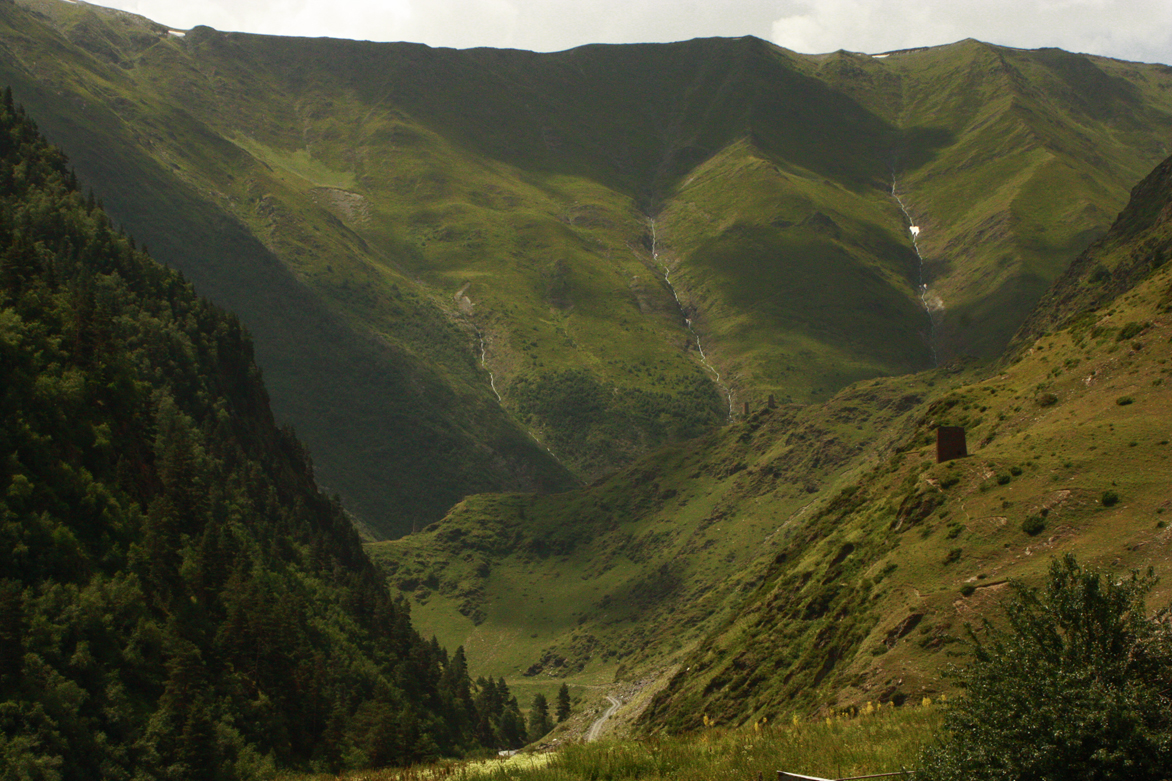
Tusheti National Park

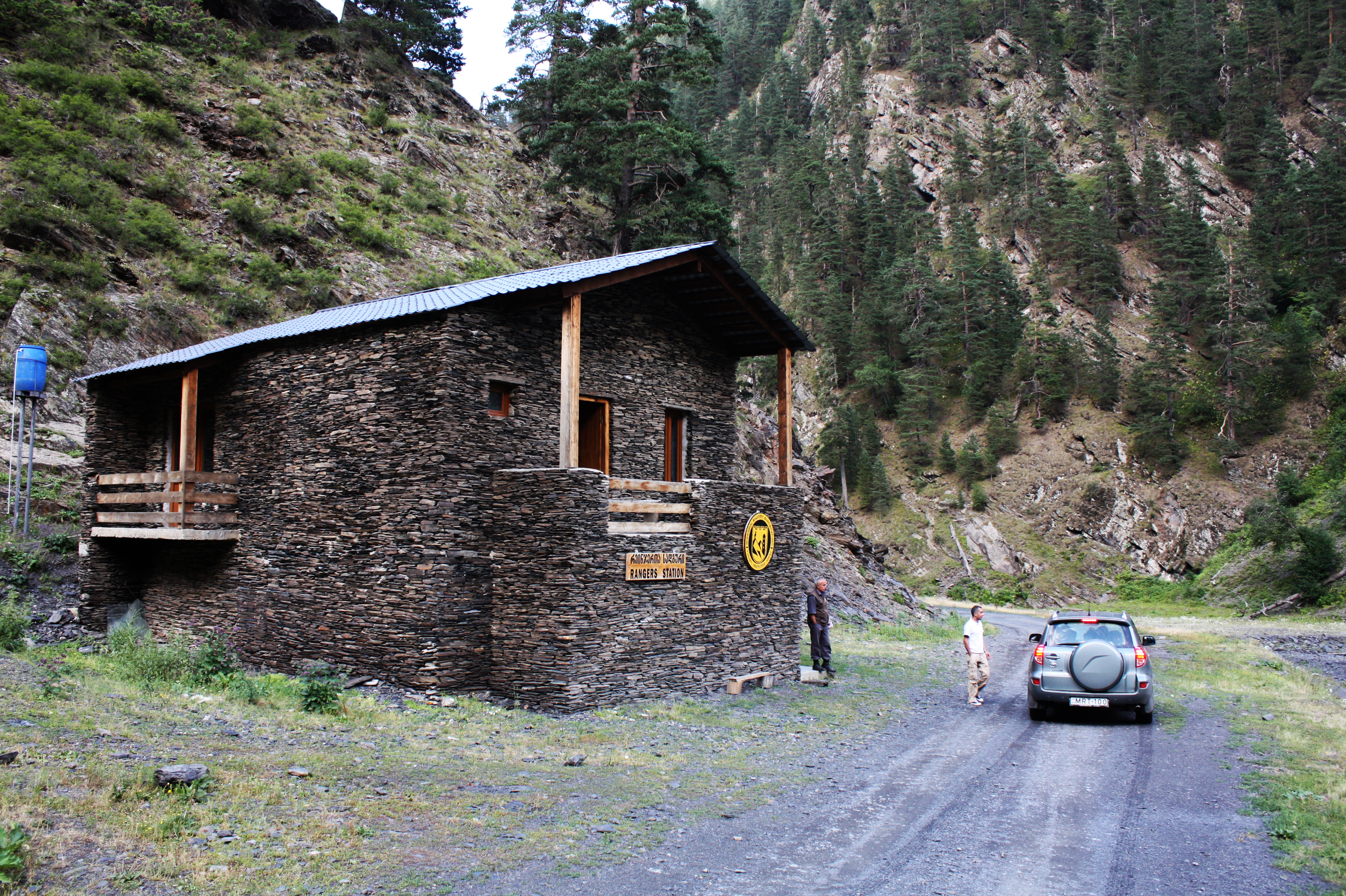
A ranger station in the park

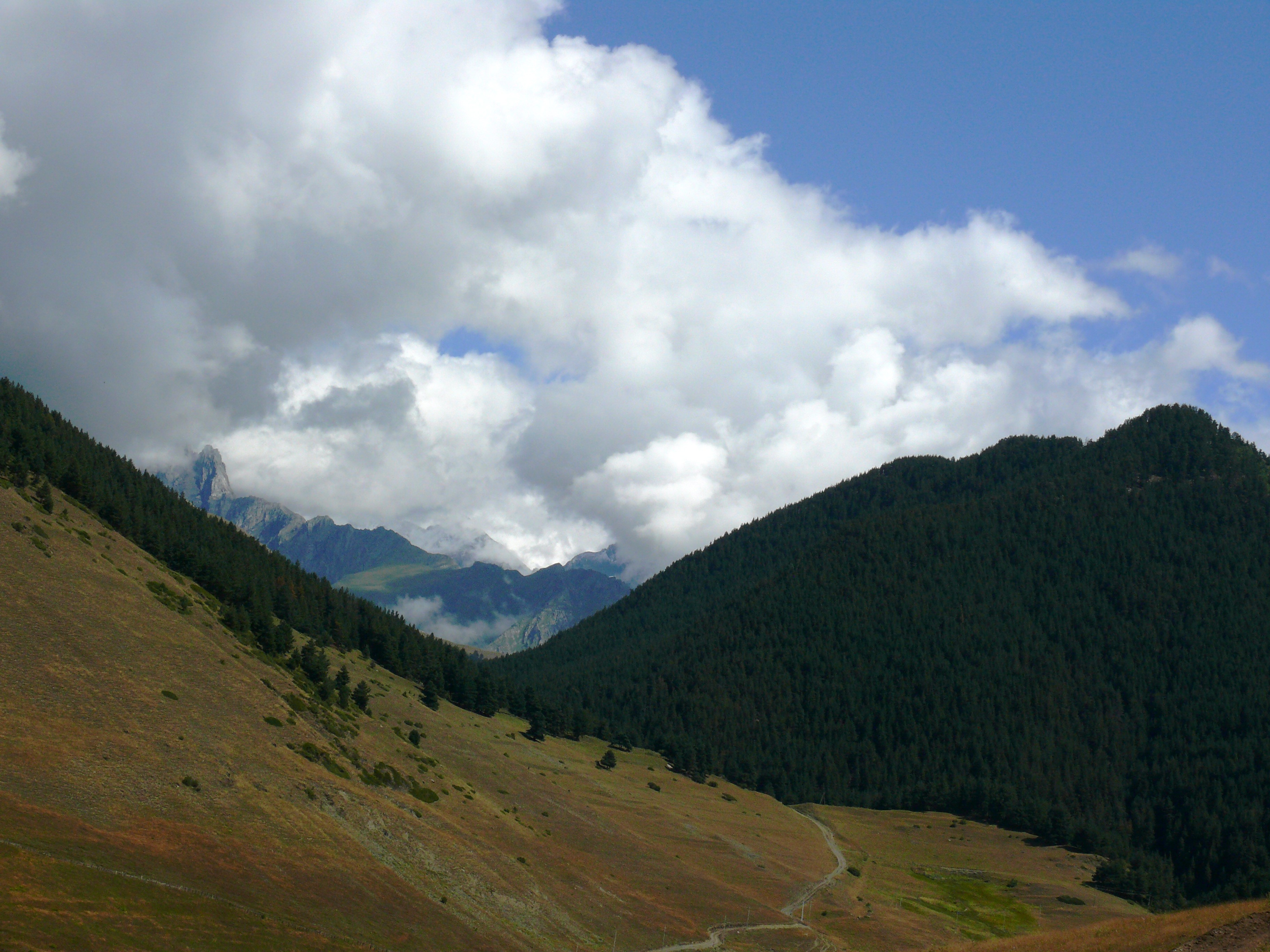
Another view of the park

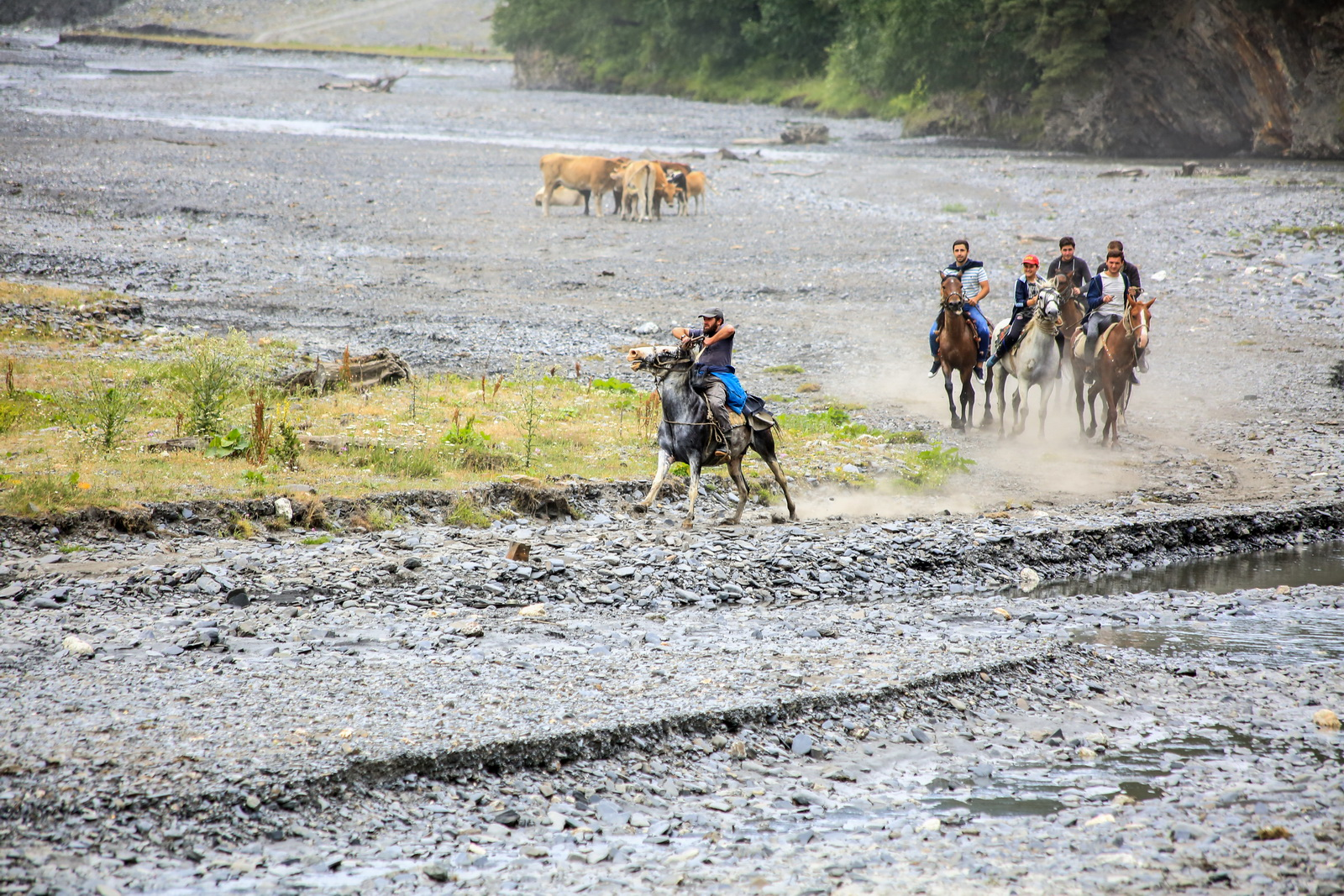

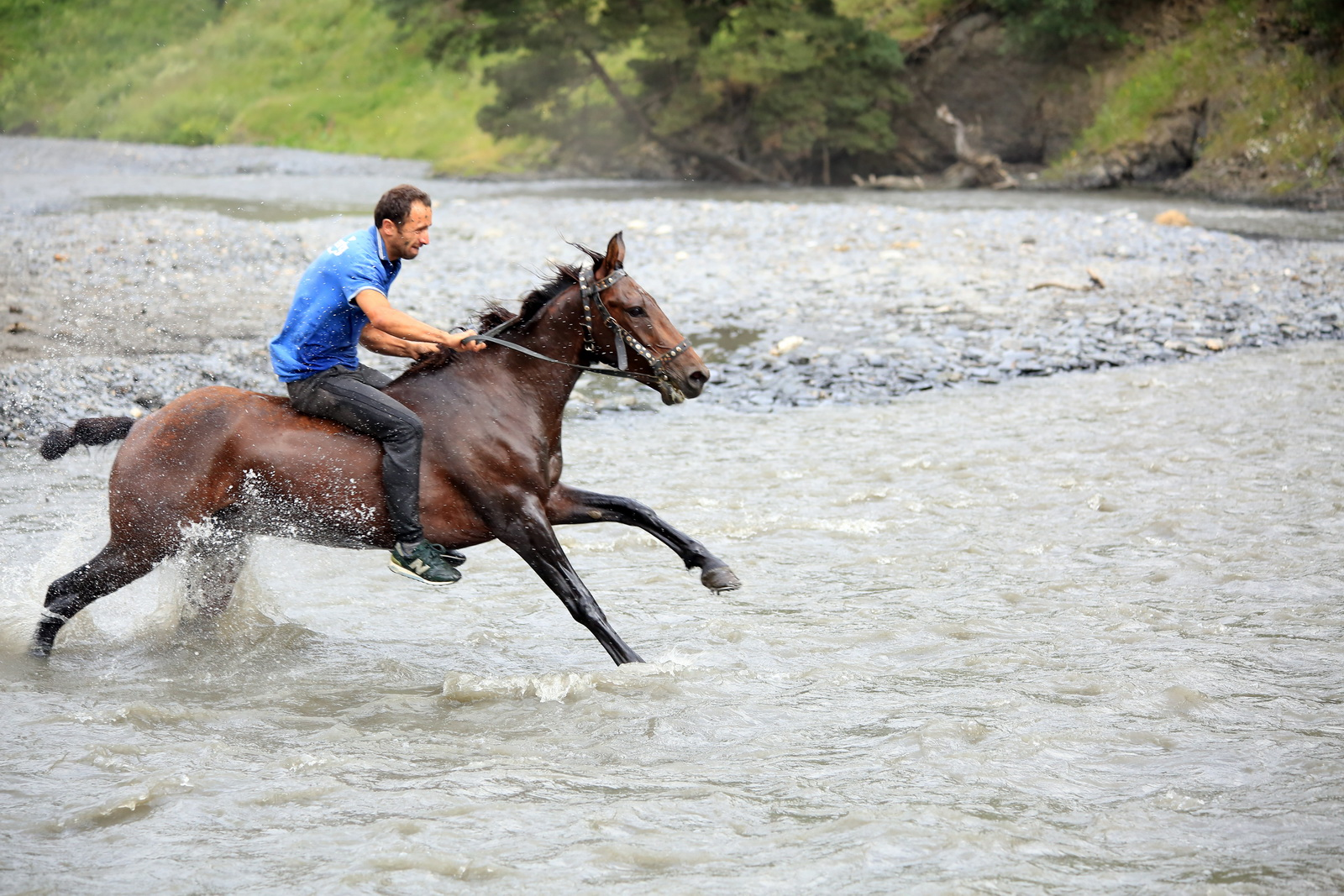

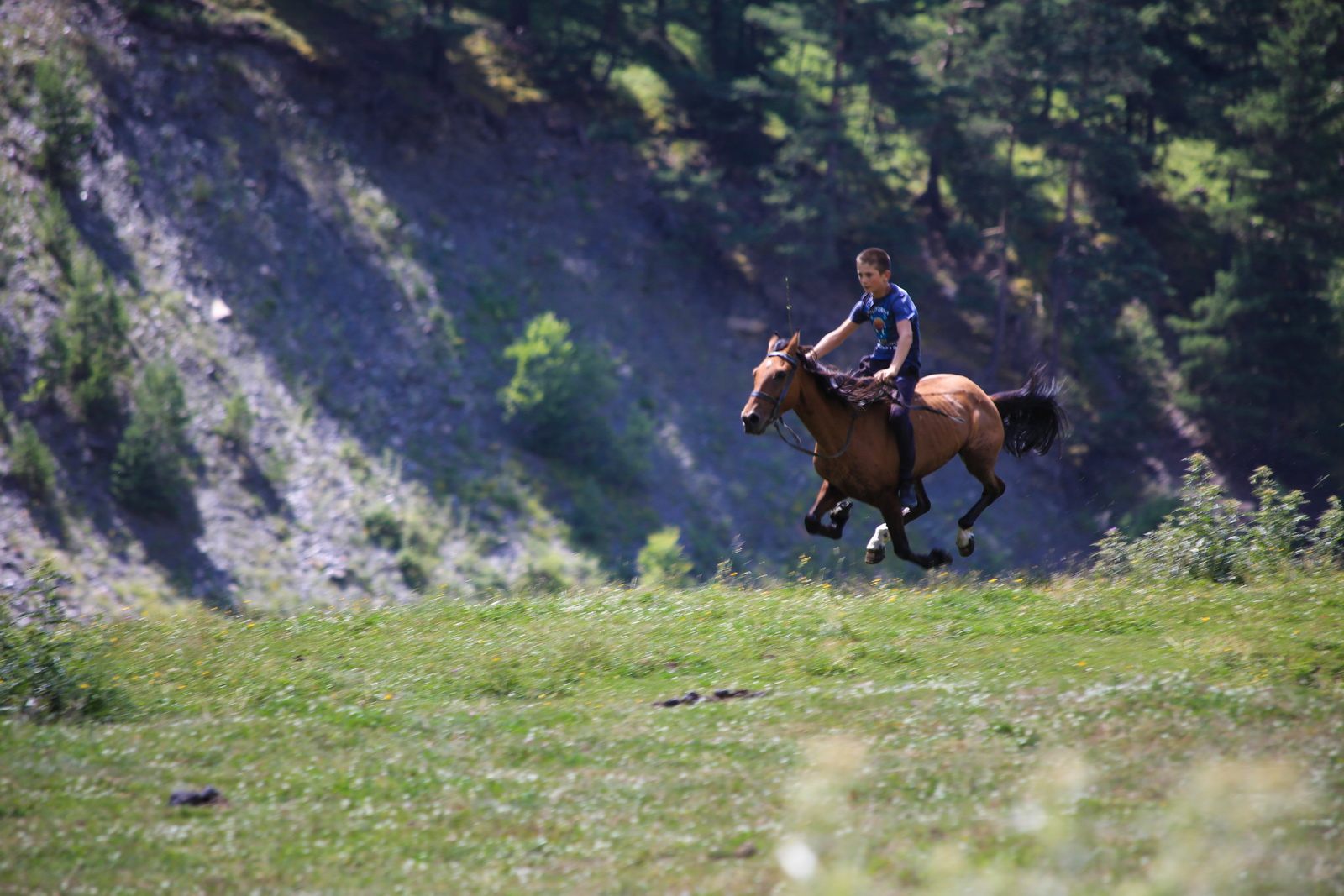

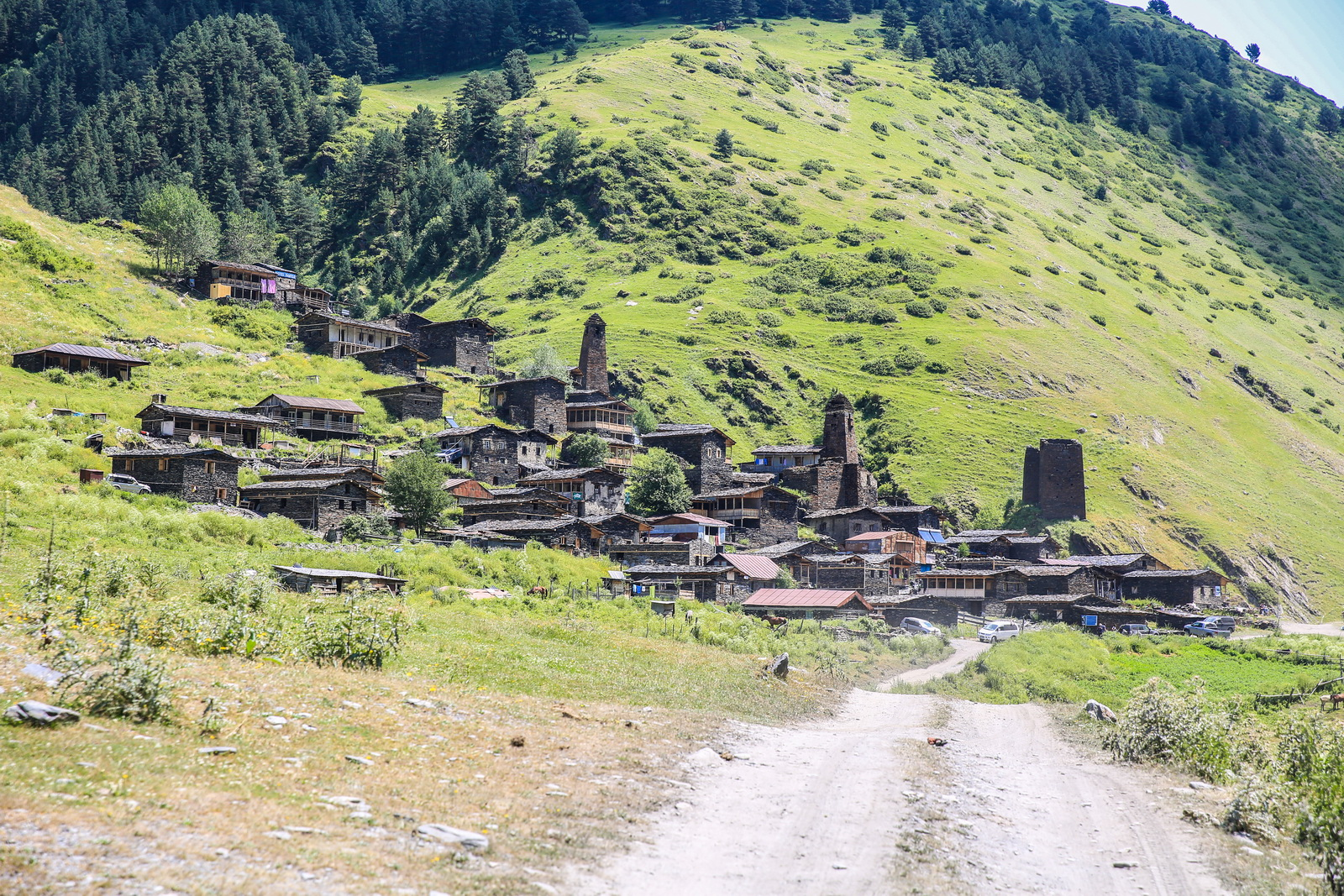

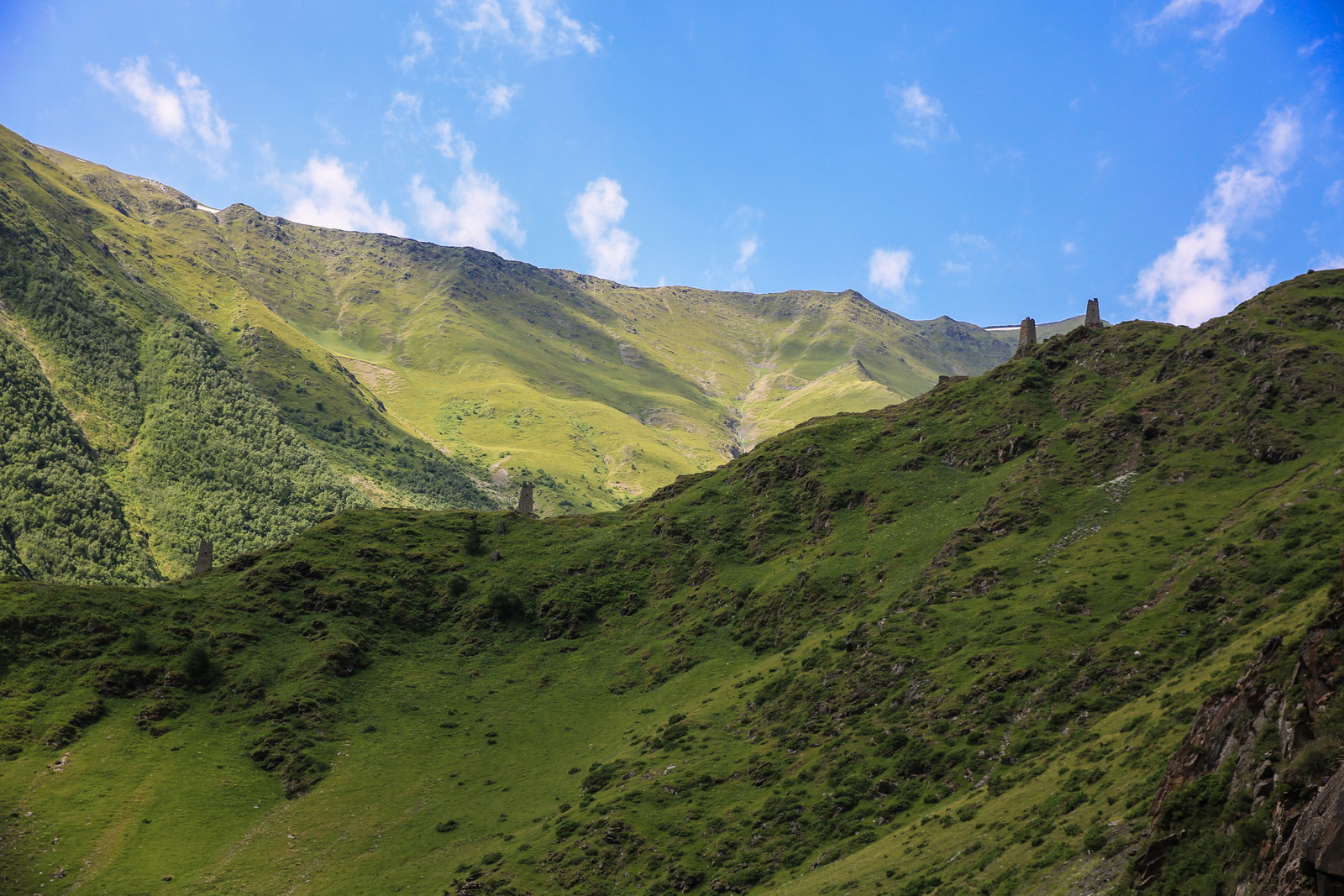

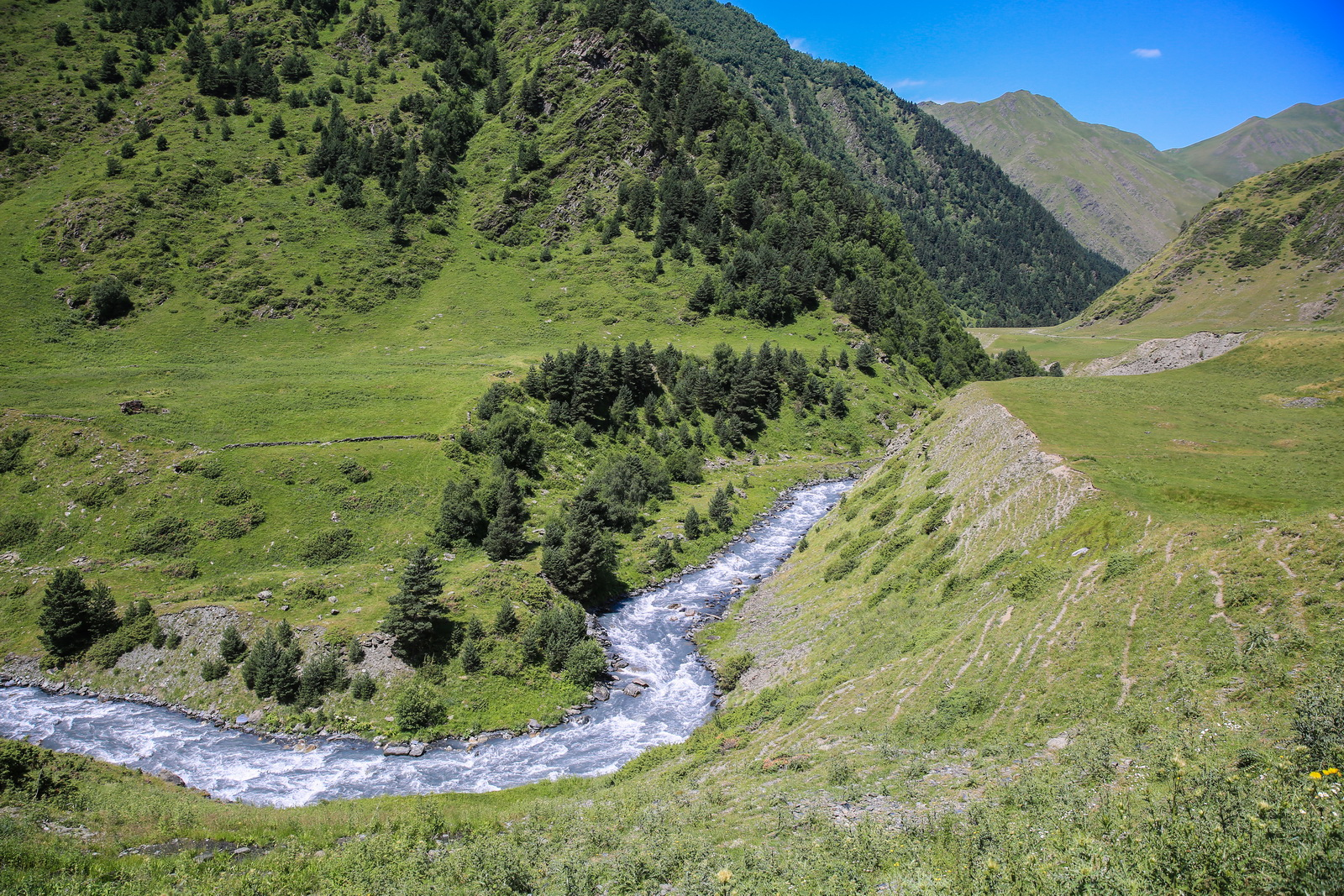

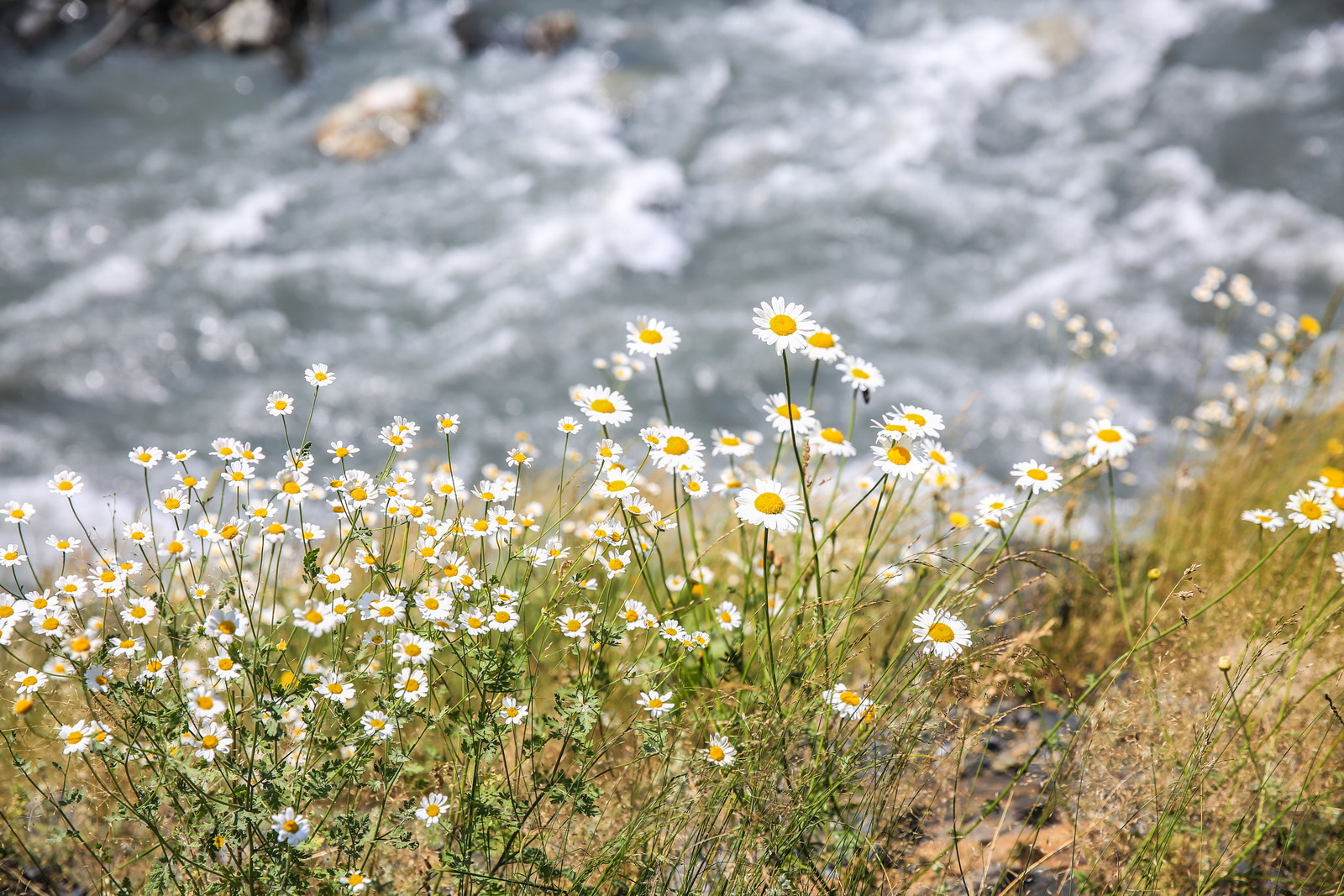

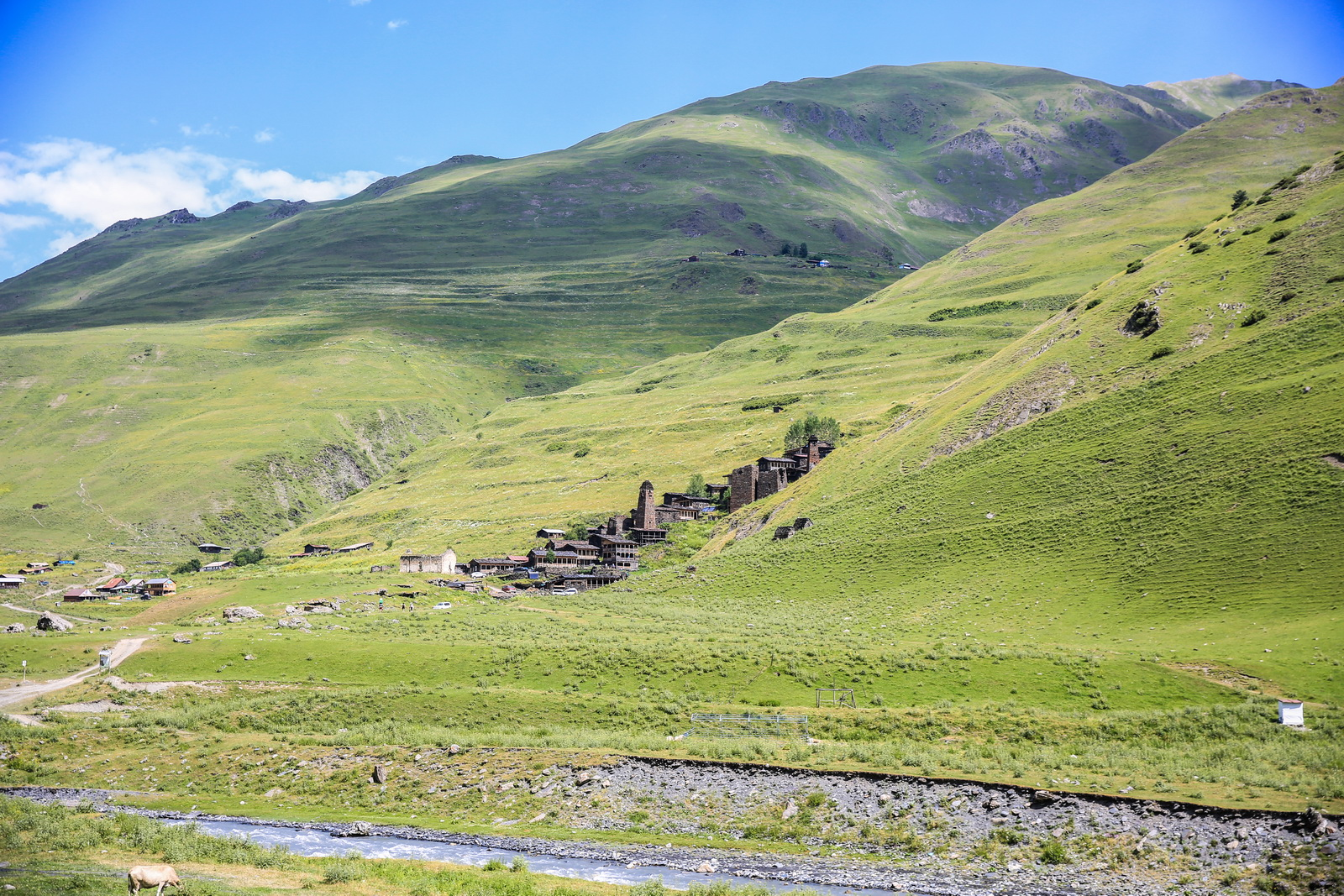

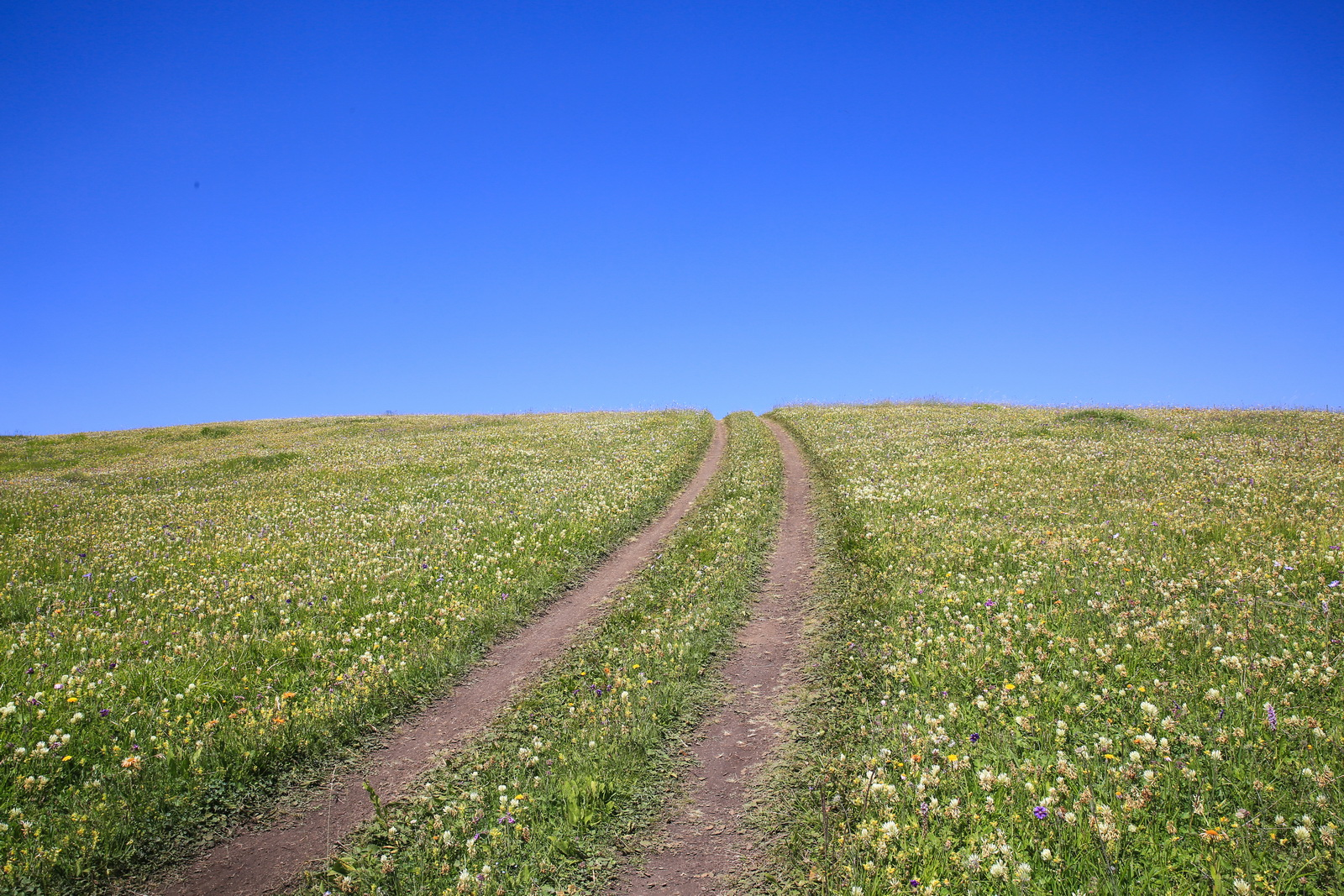

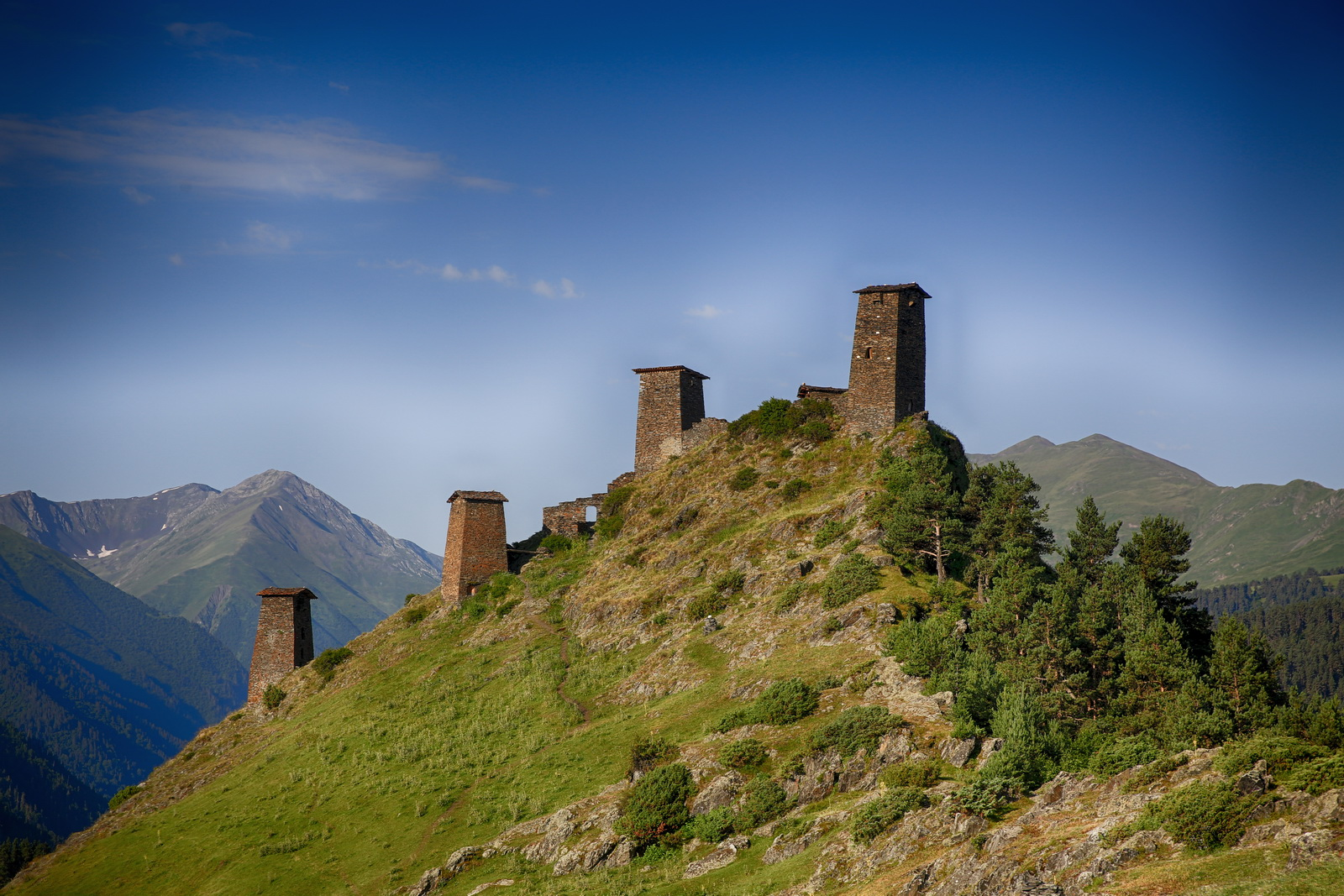

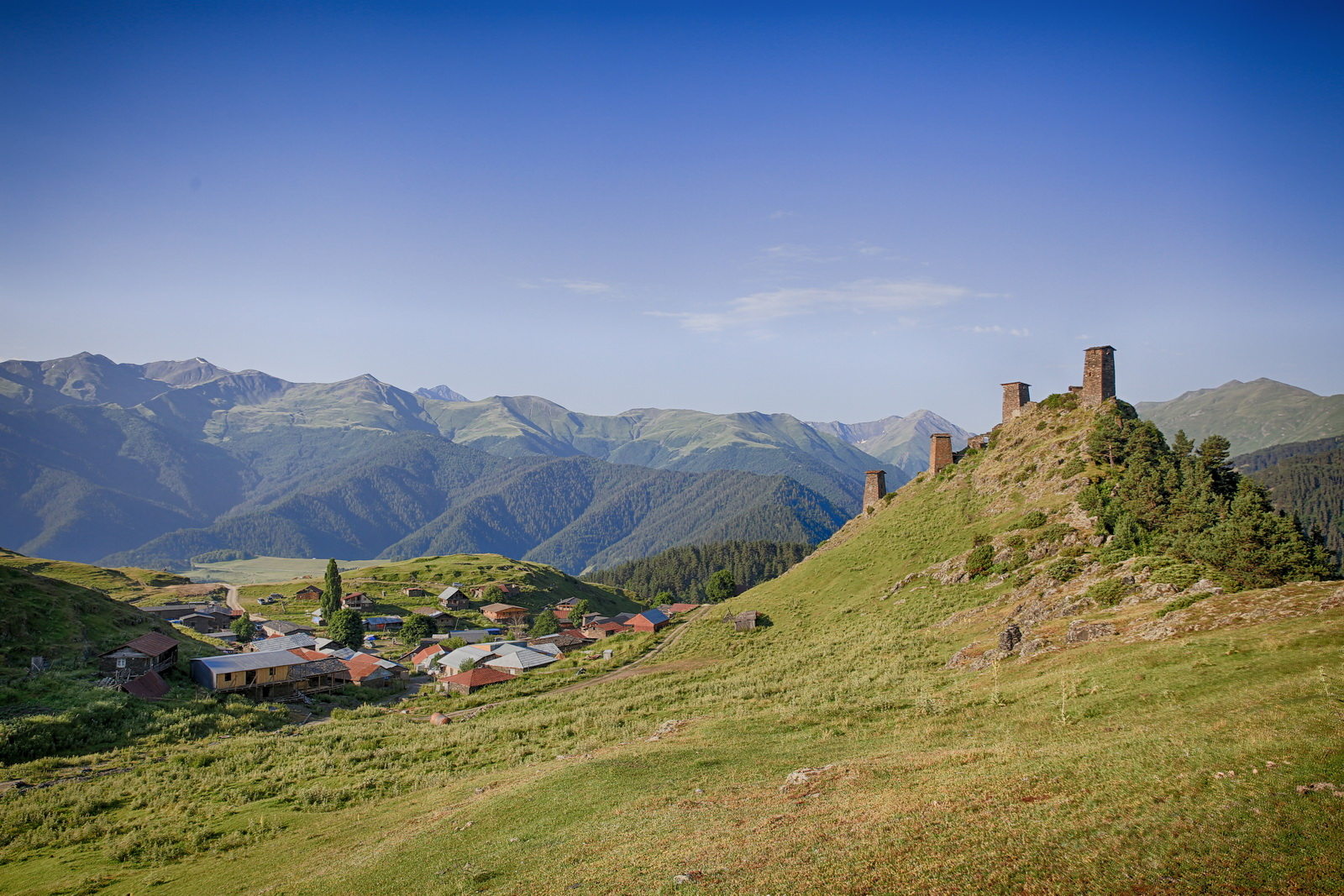

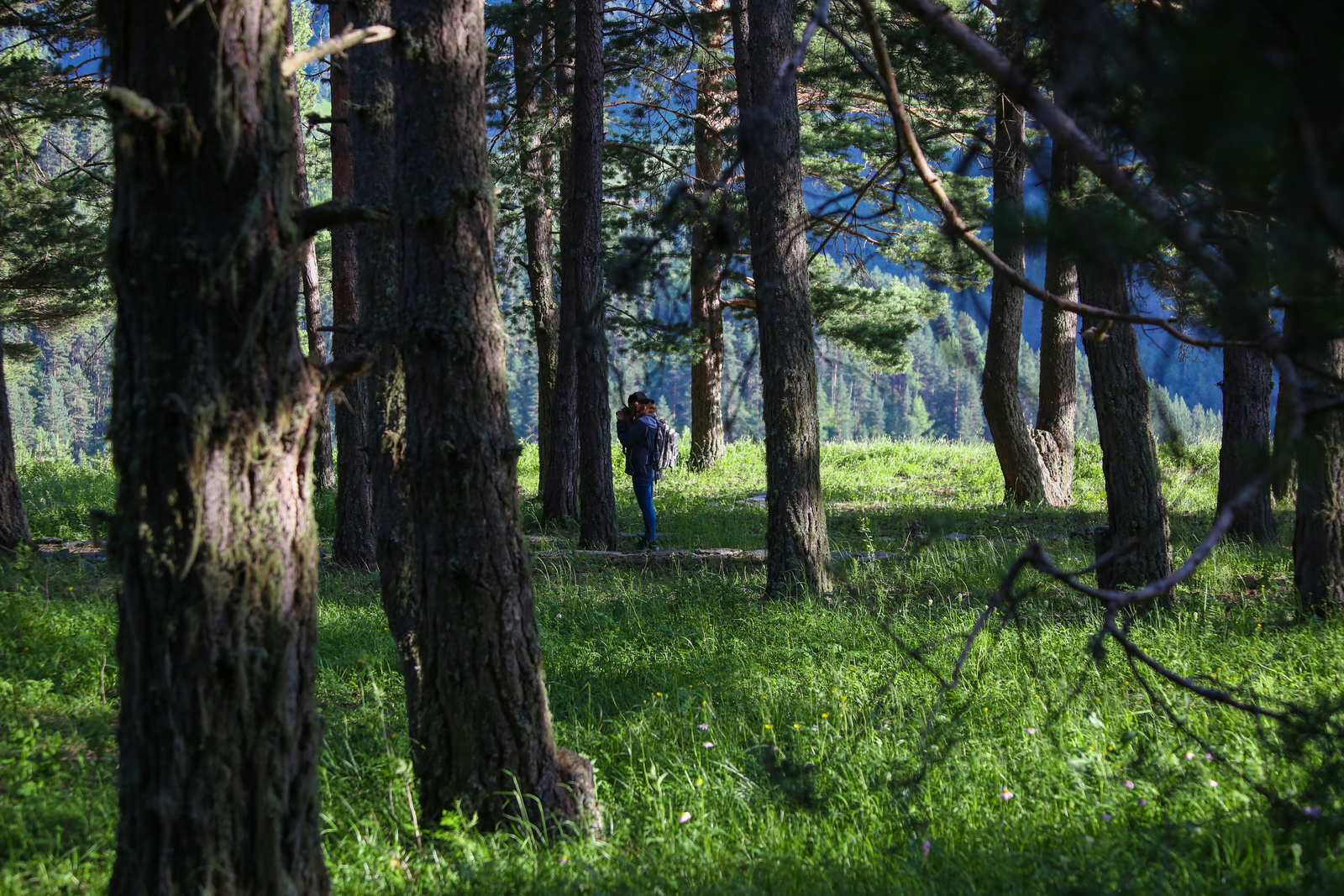

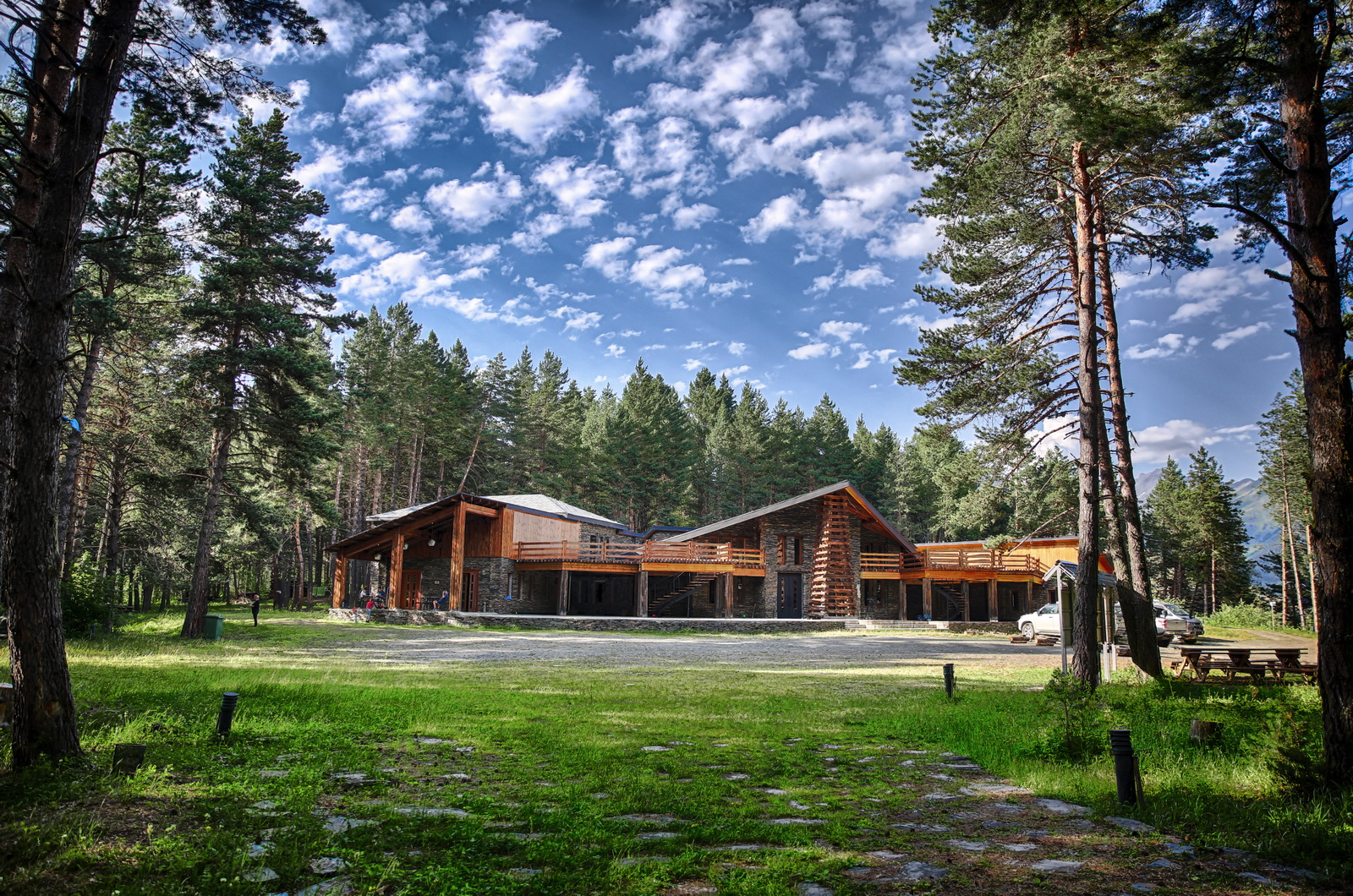

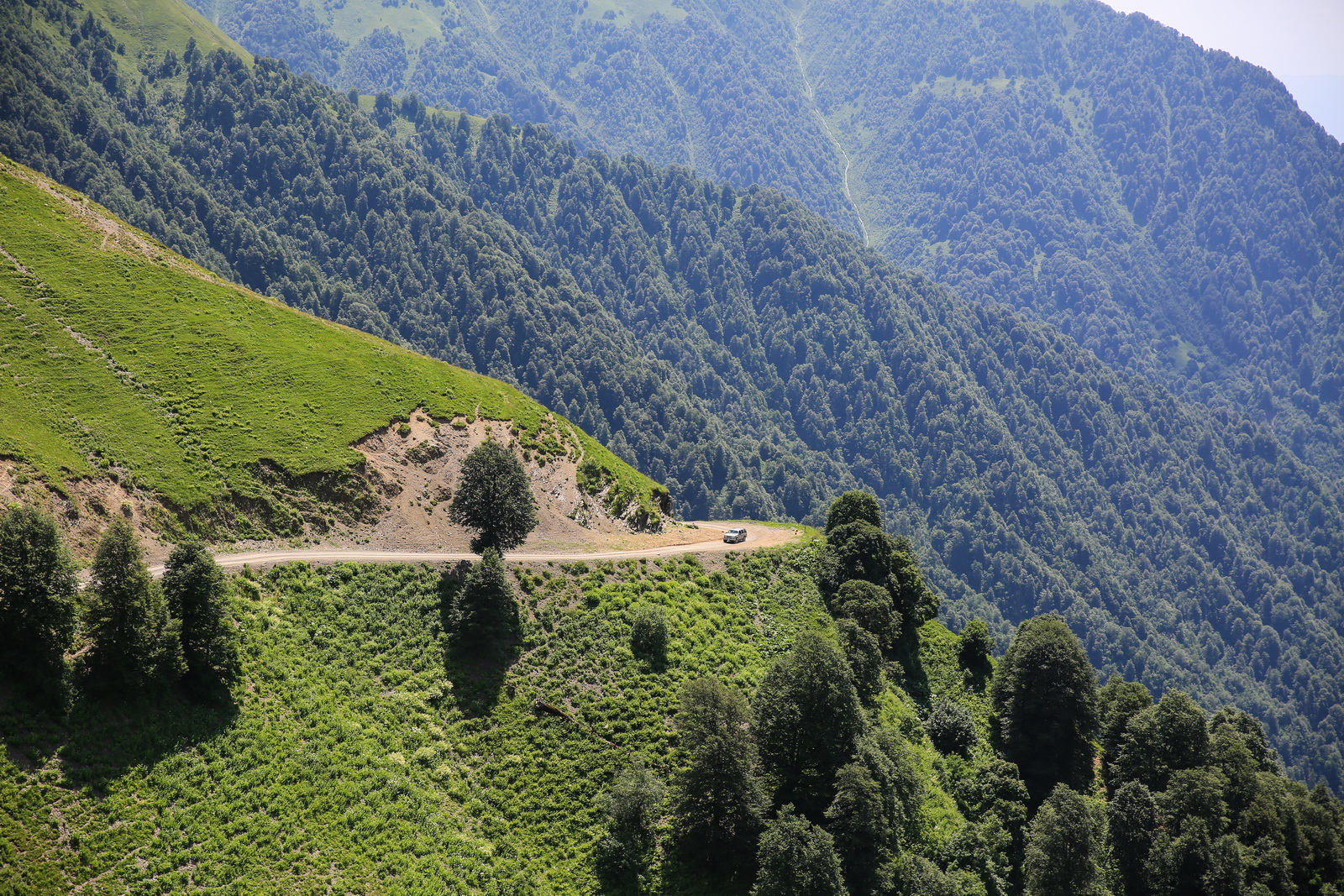

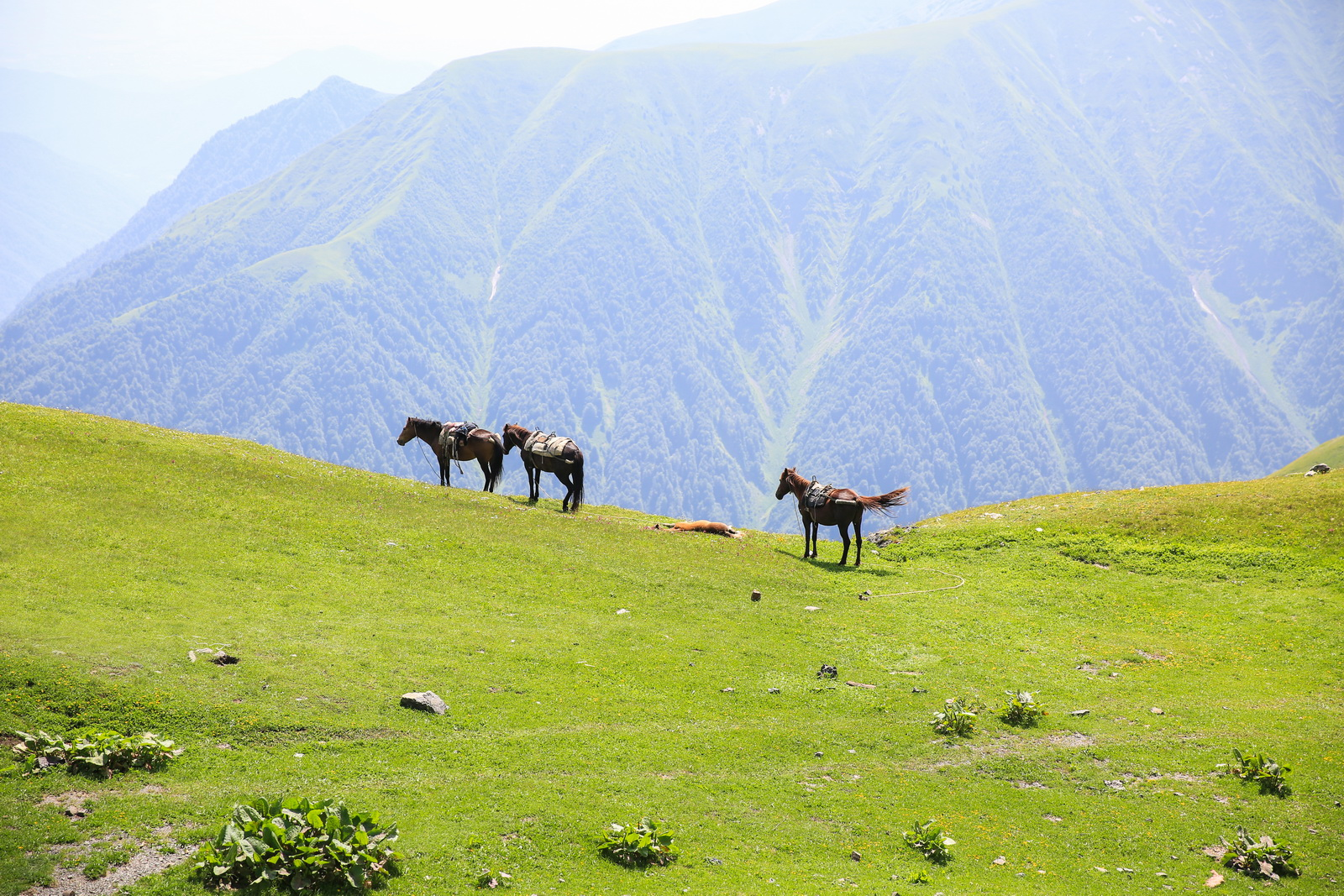

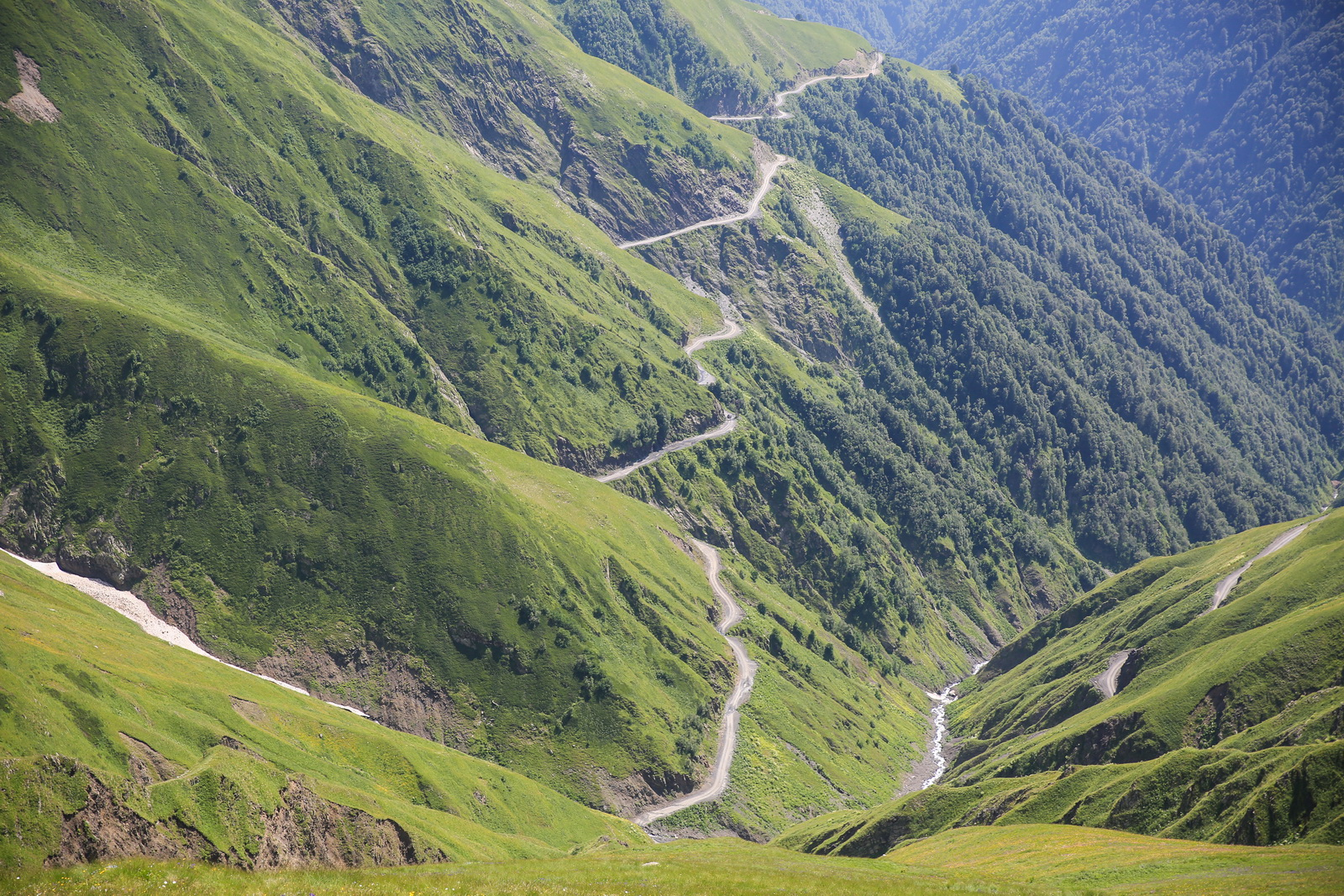

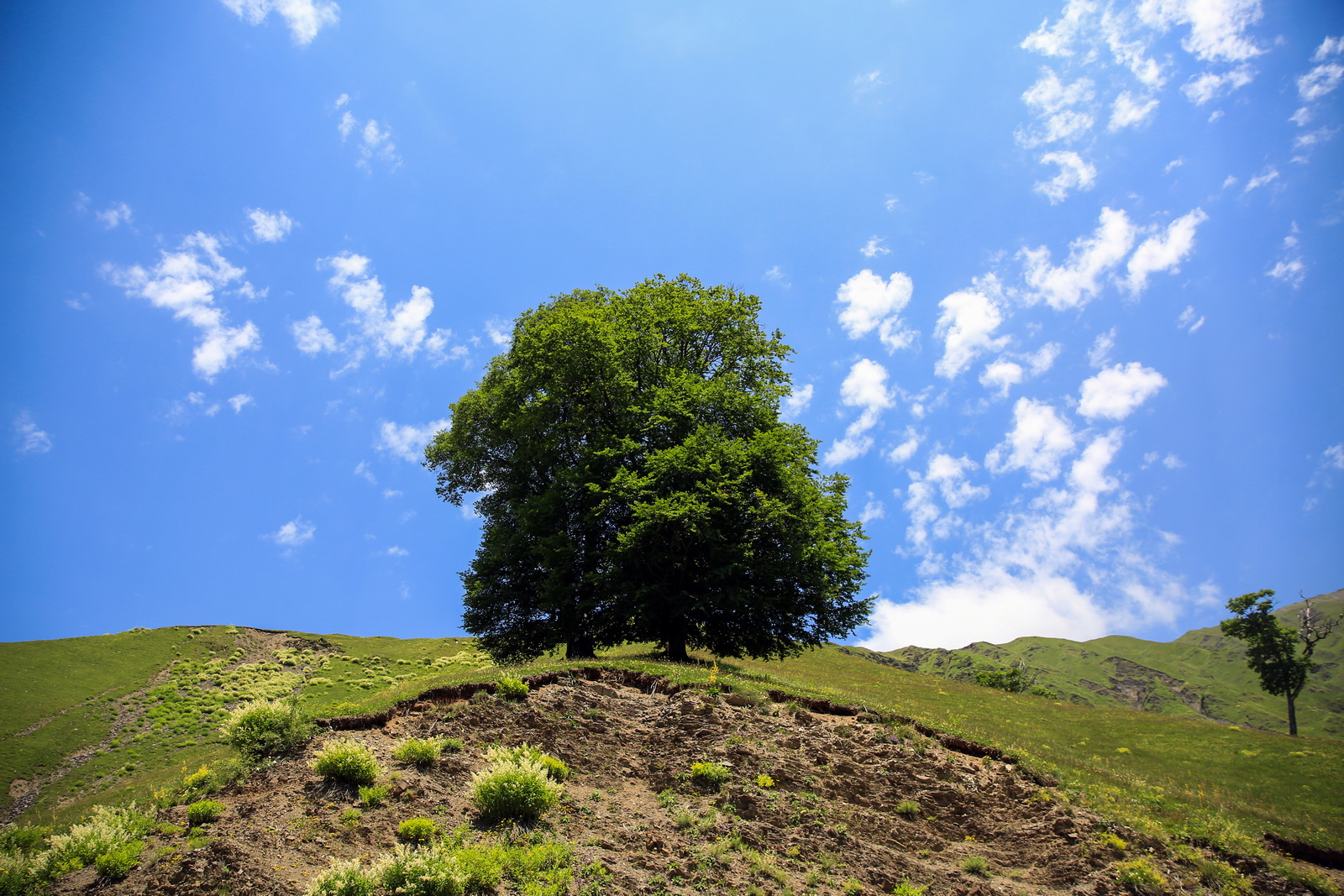

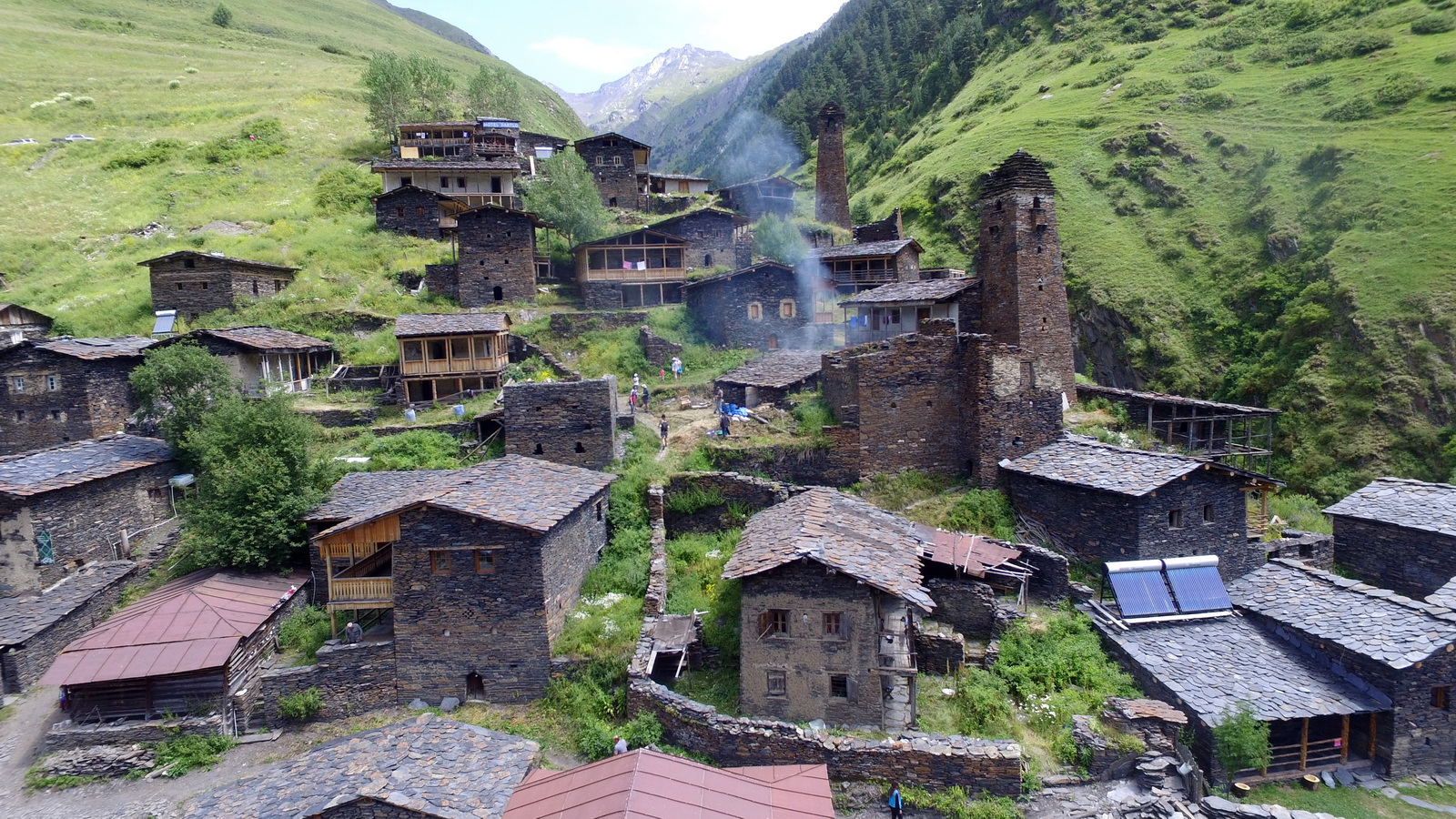

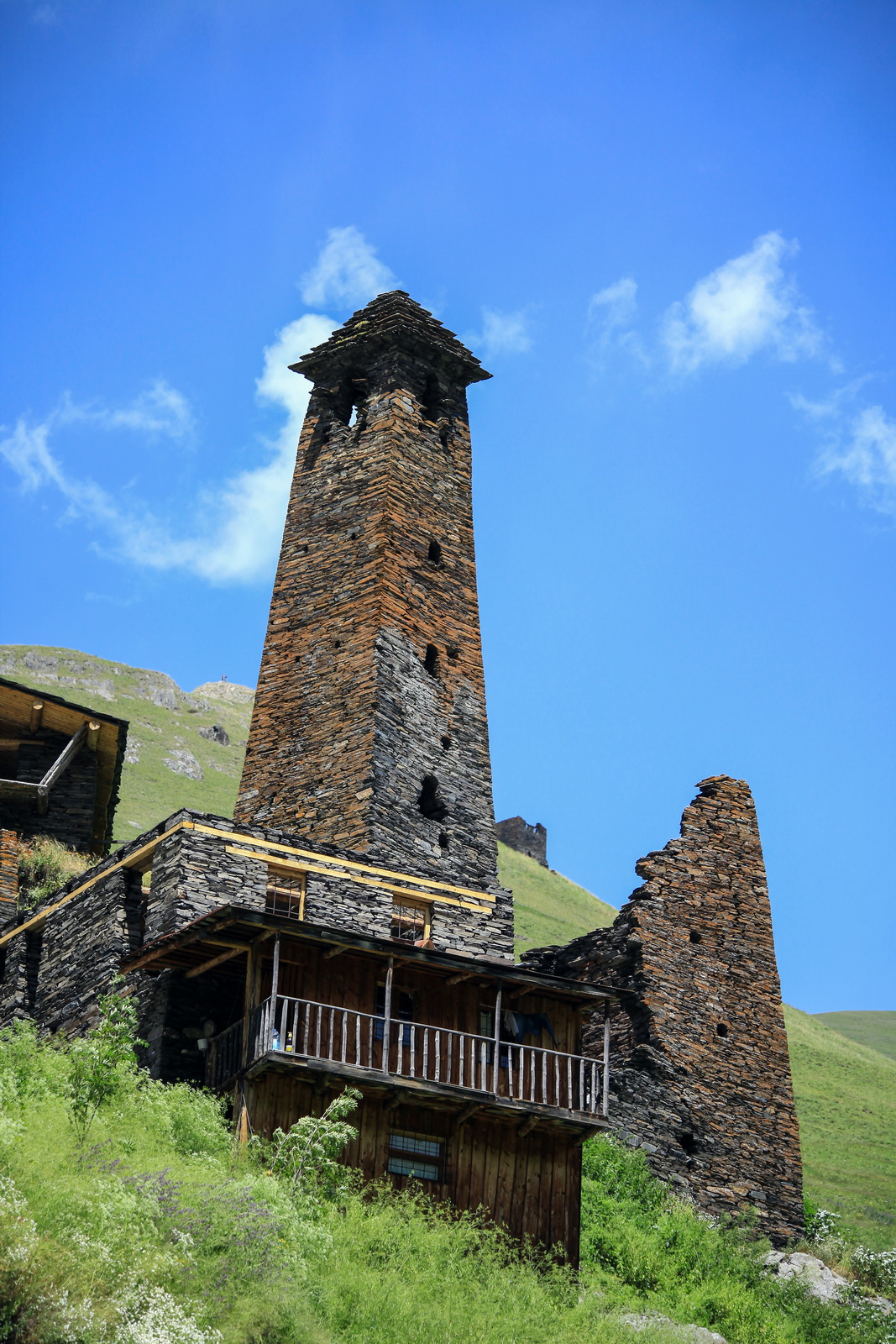

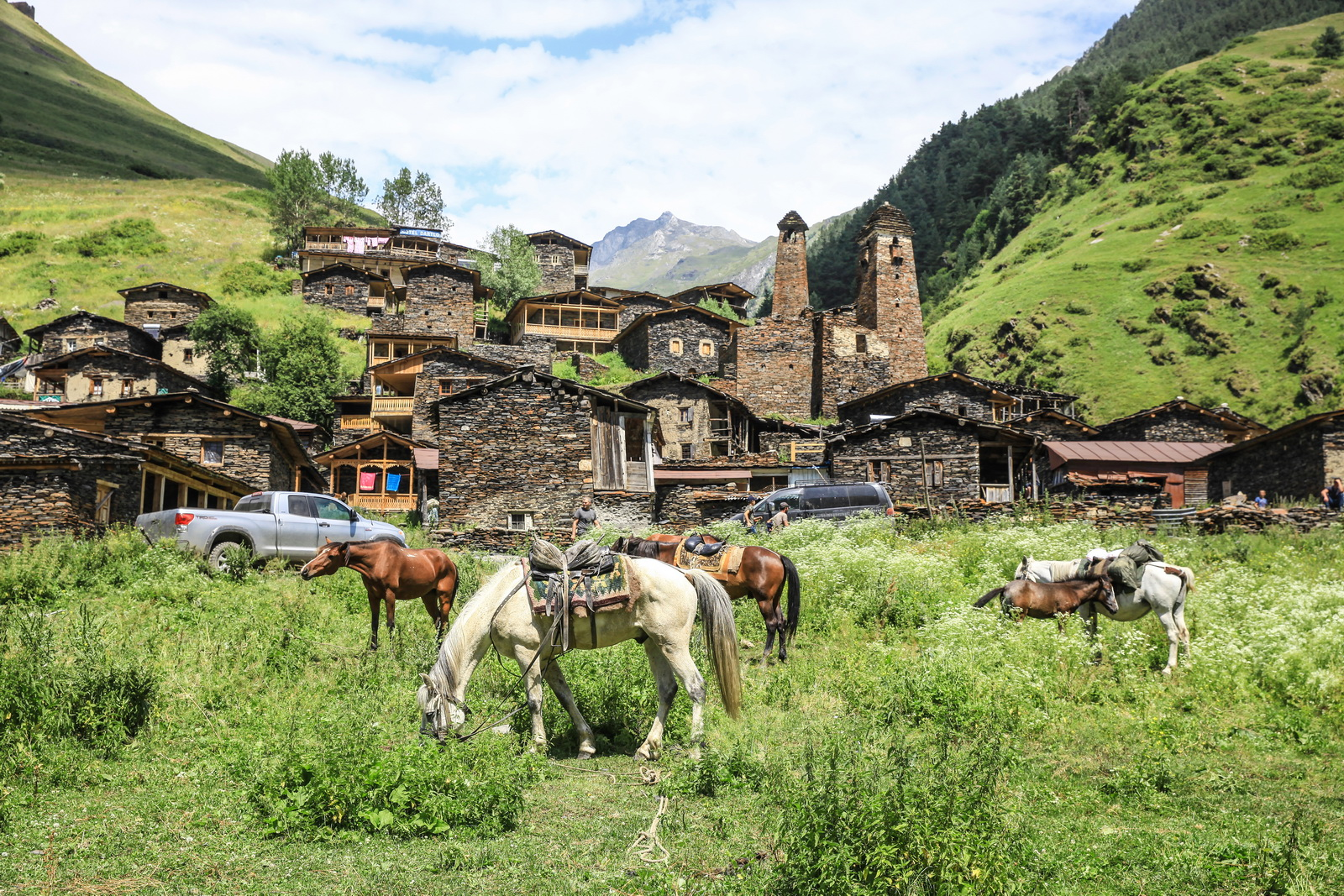

== See also ==
- Lagodekhi Protected Areas
- Tusheti Strict Nature Reserve
- Tusheti Protected Landscape
- Omalo Ethnographic Museum
