= Tusheti Strict Nature Reserve =

Georgian nature reserve

- IUCN category Ia (strict nature reserve)
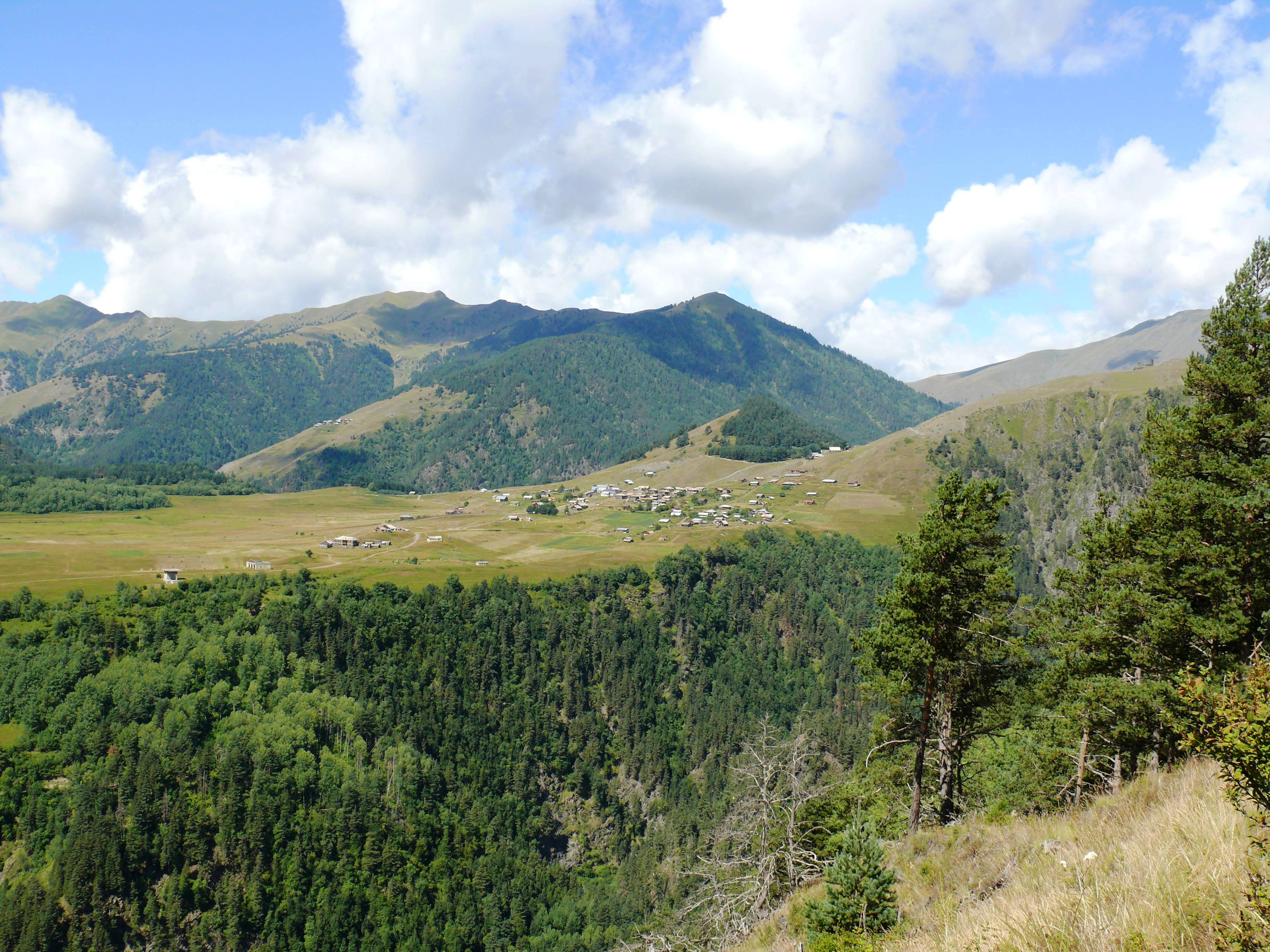
- Tusheti Omalo

- Location within Georgia Location within Kakheti
- Interactive map of Tusheti Strict Nature Reserve
- Location: Georgia
- Nearest city: village Omalo
- Coordinates: 42.38°N 45.62°E
- Area: 231.51 km^{2} (89.39 sq mi)
- Established: 2003
- Governing body: Agency of Protected Areas
- Website: Tusheti Protected Areas Administration

The Tusheti Strict Nature Reserve (თუშეთის სახელმწიფო ნაკრძალი) is located in the Tusheti Mountainous region in northeastern Georgia. Its center is located in the Akhmeta Municipality.

The Tusheti Protected Areas includes the Tusheti Strict Nature Reserve, Tusheti National Park, and the Tusheti Protected Landscape, with a total protected area of about 113,660 ha. It is one of the eight new Protected Areas approved by Parliament of Georgia on 22 April 2003.

== Flora ==
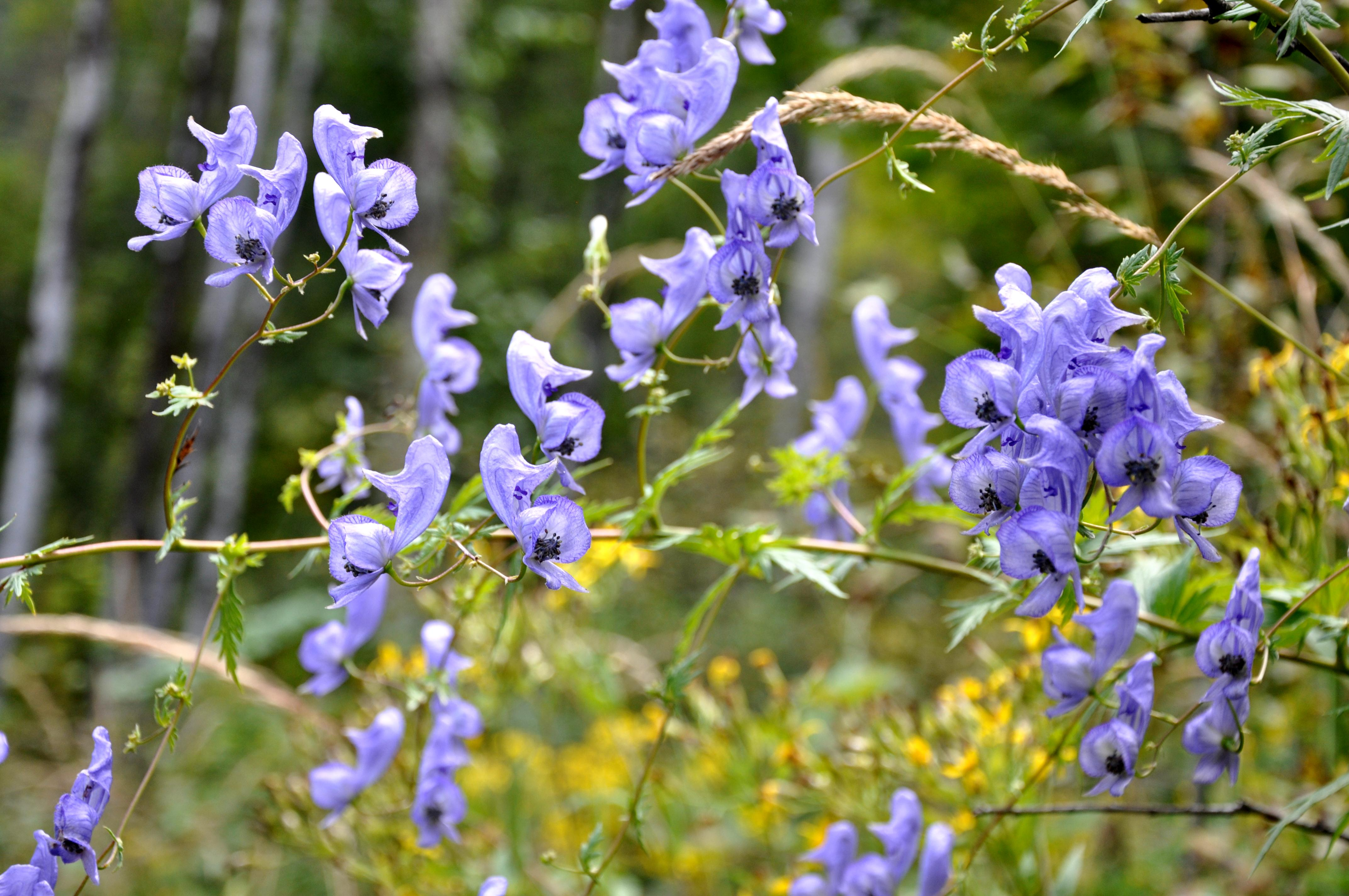
Tushetian Monkshood (Aconitum tuscheticum)

Flora of Tusheti region is highly endemic to Caucasus represented by 230 endemic plants which is more than 20% of total amount of endemics found in entire Caucasus region.

This includes Tushetian monkshood (Aconitum tuscheticum), Iberian barberry (Berberis iberica), bellflower (Campanula), bear nut-tree (Corylus iberica), lily (Pancratium), Tushetian dog-rose (Rosa tuschetica), Tebulo's buttercup (Ranunculus tebulossicus) Black or Radde's birch (Betula raddeana), Caucasian fritillaries (Fritillaria caucasica), yellow Caucasian fritillaries (Fritillaria lutea), Juliana primrose (Primula juliae), Georgian snow rose (Rhododendron caucasicum), squill (Scilla) to name just a few.

== Fauna ==
Fauna is represented by 60 species of mammals, about 120 species of birds, four species of reptiles, six species of amphibians and one species of fish.

== See also ==
- List of protected areas of Georgia
- Tusheti National Park
- Tusheti Protected Landscape
- List of mammals of Georgia (country)
- List of birds of Georgia (country)
- Caucasus-Anatolian-Hyrcanian temperate forest
