= Tusheti Protected Landscape =

National park in Georgia

- IUCN category V (protected landscape/seascape)
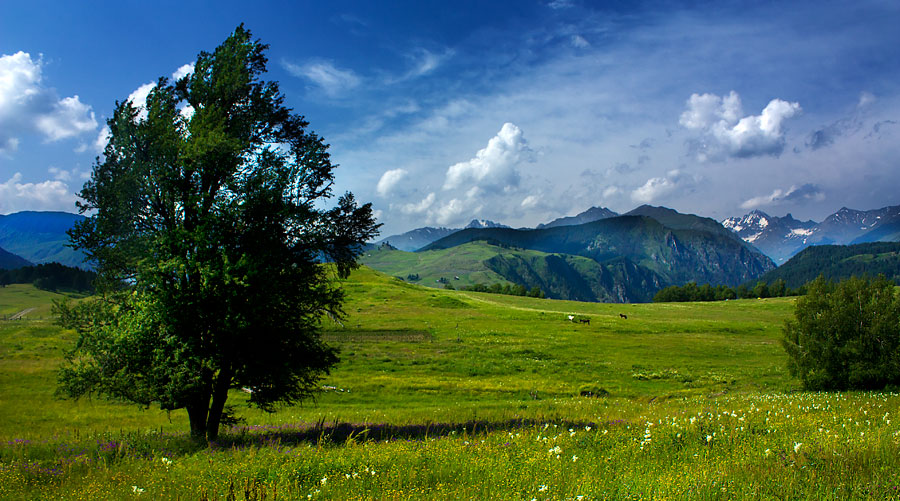
- Omalo area

- Location within Georgia Location within Kakheti
- Interactive map of Tusheti Protected Landscape
- Location: Georgia
- Nearest city: Tusheti
- Coordinates: 42°24′03.4″N 45°42′30.5″E
- Area: 579.17 km^{2} (223.62 sq mi)
- Established: 2003
- Governing body: Agency of Protected Areas
- Website: Tusheti Protected Areas Administration

Tusheti Protected Landscape (Georgian: თუშეთის დაცული ლანდშაფტი) is located in the Tusheti Mountainous region in the north-eastern part of Georgia. Visitors center is located in village lower Alvani, Akhmeta Municipality. It is one of the eight new Protected Areas approved by Parliament of Georgia on 22 April 2003.

The Tusheti Protected Areas includes Tusheti Protected Landscape, Tusheti National Park and Tusheti Strict Nature Reserve with total protected area about 113,660.2 ha.

== See also ==
- List of protected areas of Georgia
- Tusheti National Park
- Tusheti Strict Nature Reserve
