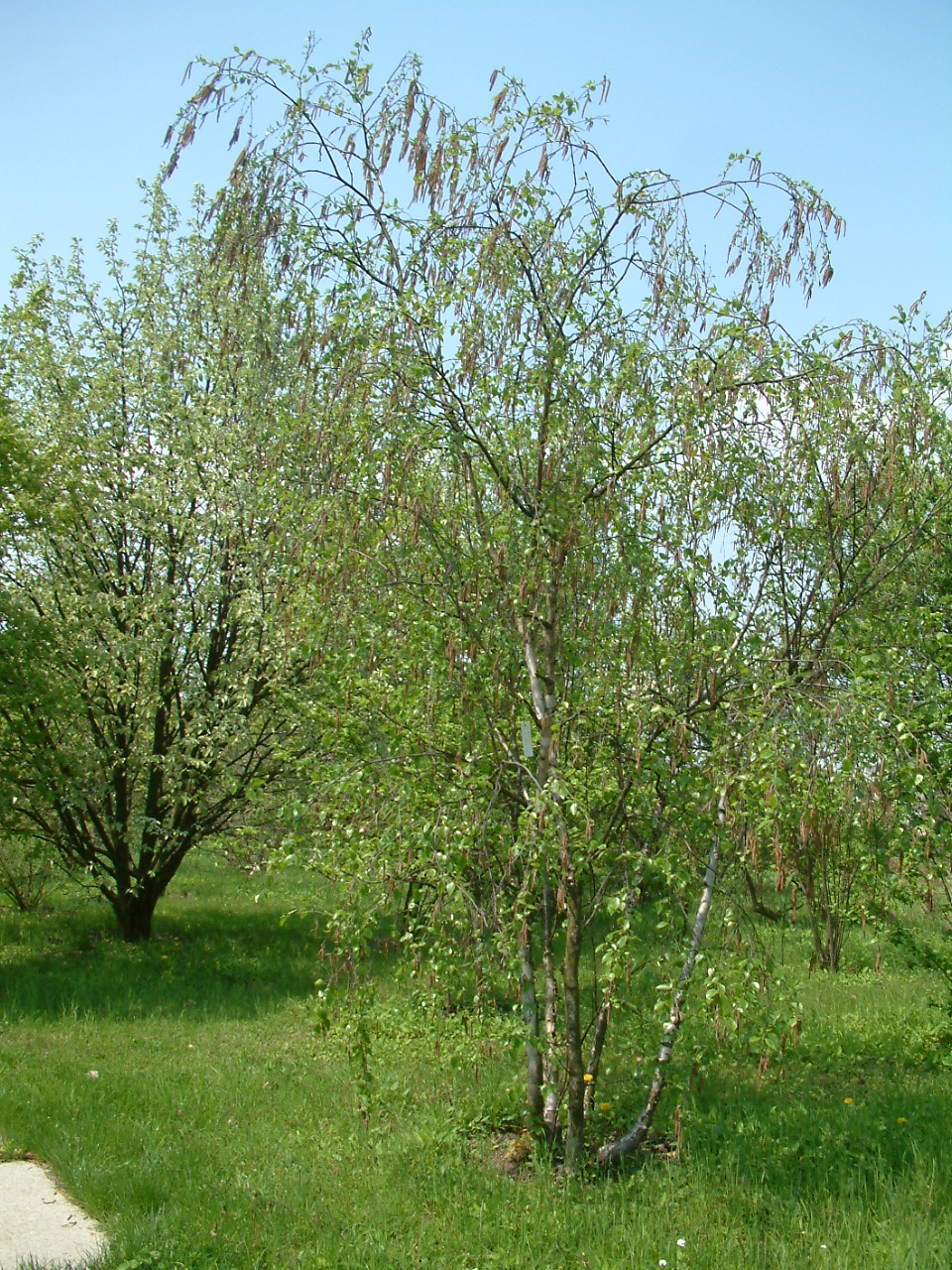

Conservation status
- Least Concern (IUCN 3.1)

Scientific classification
- Kingdom: Plantae
- Clade: Embryophytes
- Clade: Tracheophytes
- Clade: Angiosperms
- Clade: Eudicots
- Clade: Rosids
- Order: Fagales
- Family: Betulaceae
- Genus: Betula
- Subgenus: Betula subg. Neurobetula
- Species: B. raddeana

Binomial name
- Betula raddeana Trautv.

Synonyms
- Betula aischatiae E.S.Husseinov; Betula maarensis V.N.Vassil. & Husseinova; Betula victoris E.S.Husseinov

= Betula raddeana =

Species of birch

Betula raddeana is a species of flowering plant in the Betulaceae family. It is a tree native to the Caucasus of Georgia and Russia. It is threatened by habitat loss.
