= Caucasus Mountains =

Mountain system at the intersection of Europe and Asia

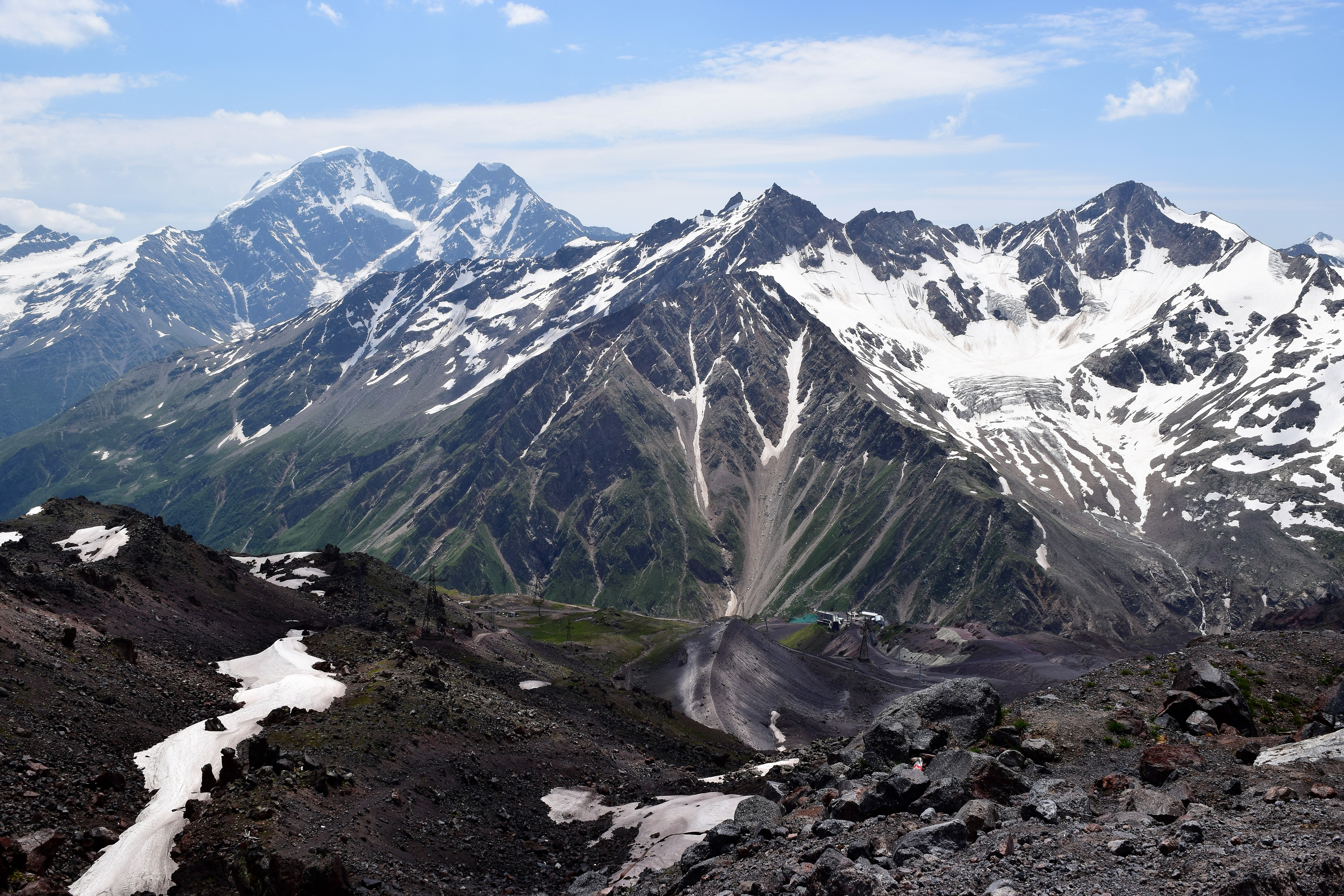

Highest point
- Peak: Mount Elbrus
- Elevation: 5,642 m (18,510 ft)
- Listing: Seven Summits
- Coordinates: 43°21′18″N 42°26′31″E

Dimensions
- Length: 1,200 km (750 mi)
- Width: 160 km (99 mi)
- Area: 477,165 km^{2} (184,234 sq mi)

Geography
- Topographic map
- Countries: Russia; Georgia; Azerbaijan; Armenia
- Continent: Eurasia
- Range coordinates: 42°30′N 45°00′E

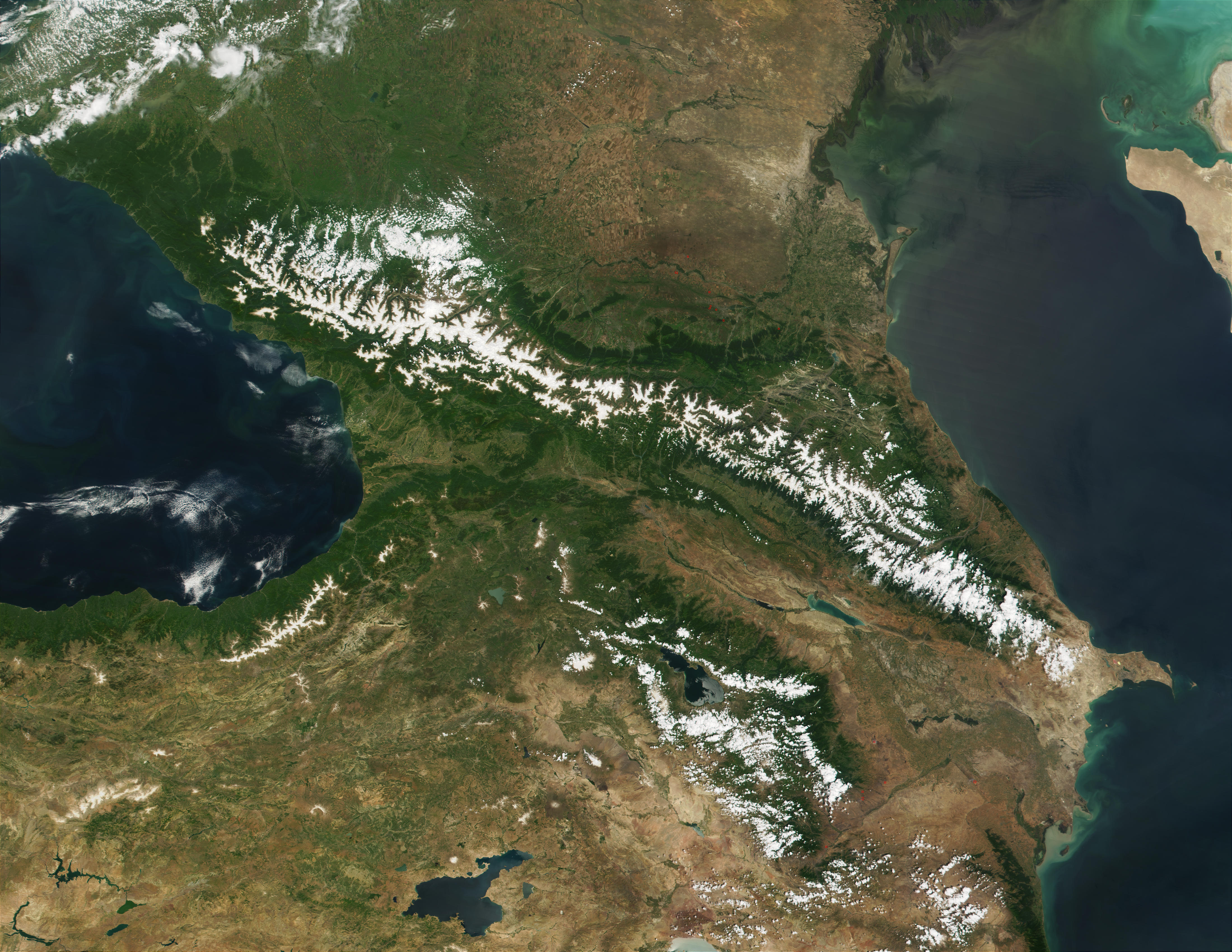
Satellite image of the Caucasus Mountains

The Caucasus Mountains (Note: Native names: Georgian: კავკასიონი, romanized: k'avk'asioni [kʼafkʼasioni]; Armenian: Կովկասյան լեռներ, romanized: Kovkasyan leṙner [kɔvkɑsjɑn lɛrˈnɛɾ]; Azerbaijani: Гафгаз дағлары, Qafqaz dağları [qɑfqɑz dɑʁlɑrɯ]; Russian: Кавка́зские го́ры, romanized: Kavkázskiye góry [kɐfˈkasːkʲɪje ˈɡorɨ]; Avar: Кавказалъул мугӀрул, romanized: Kavkazaļul muⱨrul; Lezgian: Кавказдин дагъ, romanized: Kavkazdin dagh; Kumyk: Кавказны тёбе, romanized: Kavkaznı töbe; Chechen: Кавказан лаьмнаш, romanized: Kavkazan lämnaş; Ingush: Кавказа лоамаш, romanized: Kavkaza loamash; Karachay-Balkar: Кавказ таула, romanized: Kavkaz tawla; Abkhaz: Акавказтә ашьха, romanized: Akavkazṭ° ašʹxa; Iron Ossetic: Кавказы хӕхтӕ, romanized: Kavkazy hæhtæ; Turkish: Kafkas Dağları [kafkas daːɫaɾɯ]; Persian: كوه‌هاى قفقاز, romanized: kuhhâ-ye Qafqâz) are a mountain range at the intersection of Asia and Europe. Stretching between the Black Sea and the Caspian Sea, they are surrounded by the Caucasus region and are home to Mount Elbrus, the highest peak in Europe at 5,642 metres (18,510 ft) above sea level.

The Caucasus Mountains include the Greater Caucasus in the north and the Lesser Caucasus in the south. The Greater Caucasus runs west-northwest to east-southeast, from the Western Caucasus on the northeastern shore of the Black Sea to close to Baku on the Caspian Sea, in Azerbaijan. The Lesser Caucasus runs parallel to the Greater about 100 km (62 mi) south. The Greater and Lesser Caucasus ranges are connected by the Likhi Range, and to the west and east of the Likhi Range lie the Colchis Plain and the Kur-Araz Lowland respectively. The Meskheti Range is a part of the Lesser Caucasus system. In the southeast, the Aras River separates the Lesser Caucasus from the Talysh Mountains which run through the Greater Azerbaijan region. The Lesser Caucasus and the Armenian Highland constitute the Transcaucasian Highland, which at their western end converges with the highland plateau of Eastern Anatolia. The Caucasus Mountains were part of the Silk Road.

== Geology ==
Geologically, the Caucasus Mountains belong to the Alpide belt system that extends from southeastern Europe into Asia and is considered a border between the two continents. The Greater Caucasus Mountains are mainly composed of Cretaceous and Jurassic rocks with the Paleozoic and Precambrian rocks in the higher regions. Some volcanic formations are found throughout the range. On the other hand, the Lesser Caucasus Mountains are formed predominantly of the Paleogene rocks with a much smaller portion of Jurassic and Cretaceous rocks. The evolution of the Caucasus began from the Late Triassic to the Late Jurassic during the Cimmerian orogeny at the active margin of the Tethys Ocean while the uplift of the Greater Caucasus is dated to the Miocene during the Alpine orogeny.

The Caucasus Mountains formed largely as the result of a tectonic plate collision between the Arabian plate moving northwards with respect to the Eurasian plate. As the Tethys Sea was closed and the Arabian plate collided with the Iranian plate and was pushed against it, and with the clockwise movement of the Eurasian plate towards the Iranian plate and their final collision, the Iranian plate was pressed against the Eurasian plate. As this happened, the rocks that had been deposited in this basin from the Jurassic to the Miocene were folded to form the Greater Caucasus Mountains. This collision also caused the uplift and the Cenozoic volcanic activity in the Lesser Caucasus Mountains.

The entire region is regularly subjected to strong earthquakes from this activity. While the Greater Caucasus Mountains have a mainly folded sedimentary structure, the Lesser Caucasus Mountains are largely of volcanic origin.

The Javakheti Plateau in Georgia and the surrounding volcanic ranges which extend well into central Armenia are some of the youngest features of the region. Only recently was the Caucasus a scene for intense volcanic activity: the Armenian highland was flooded by calc-alkaline basalts and andesites in the Pliocene and the highest summits of the Caucasus, the Elbrus, and the Kazbek, formed as Pleistocene-Pliocene volcanoes. The Kazbek is no longer active, but the Elbrus erupted in postglacial times and fumarole activity is registered near its summit. Contemporary seismic activity is a prominent feature of the region, reflecting active faulting and crustal shortening. Clusters of seismicity occur in Dagestan and in northern Armenia. Many devastating earthquakes have been documented in historical times, including the Spitak earthquake in December 1988 which destroyed the Gyumri-Vanadzor region of Armenia.

== Notable peaks ==
Mount Elbrus, at 5,642 m (18,510 ft), in the Caucasus Mountains, is sometimes cited as the highest peak in Europe. Mount Elbrus is 832 m (2,730 ft) higher than Mont Blanc, the highest peak in the Alps and Western Europe at 4,810 m (15,780 ft). However, there are some technical disagreements over whether Mount Elbrus is in Europe. The crest of the Greater Caucasus Mountains is usually taken to define the Greater Caucasus Watershed which marks the continental boundary between Asia and Europe for the region between the Black and Caspian seas. This classification would place Mount Elbrus at the junction with Asia.

The table below lists some of the highest peaks of the Caucasus. With the exception of Shkhara, the heights are taken from Soviet 1:50,000 mapping. The list includes the ten ultras (mountains of more than 1,500 m prominence) and all mountains over 4,500 m height with 300 m prominence. Mount Ağrı (5,137 m) in Turkey is just south of the Lesser Caucasus.

Some of the Highest peaks in the Caucasus Mountains
Peak name	Elevation (metres)	Prominence (metres)	Country
Elbrus	5,642	4,741	Russia
Dykh-Tau	5,205	2,002	Russia
Shkhara	5,193 (Note: The elevation and coordinates given here are taken from a DGPS survey by Peter Schoen and Boris Avdeev, in association with "GeoAT".. It was carried out in July 2010 and "made available". November 2010. in November 2010. Some sources, including the Great Soviet Encyclopedia, give the estimation of only 5,068 metres (16,627 feet), but this is the correct height of the lower western summit. Soviet era 1:50,000 mapping shows a 5,158 metre spot height to the east, and this can be verified using a "panoramic photograph". Archived from the original on July 25, 2011. taken from Elbrus. The true [maximum] elevation is on higher ground, still further east along the Shkhara ridge.)	1,365	Georgia / Russia
Koshtan-Tau	5,152	822	Russia
Pushkin peak	5,100	110	Russia
Janga (Dzhangi-Tau)	5,085	300	Georgia / Russia
Mizhirgi	5,047	10	Russia
Kazbek	5,034	2,353	Georgia / Russia
Katyn-Tau	4,979	240	Georgia / Russia
Kukurtlu Dome	4,978	18	Russia
Gistola	4,860	320	Georgia / Russia
Shota Rustaveli	4,960	c. 50	Georgia / Russia
Tetnuldi	4,858	672	Georgia
Jimara (Jimari)	4,780	840	Georgia / Russia
Ushba	4,710	1,143	Georgia
Dumala-Tau	4,682	332	Russia
Gora Uilpata	4,649	1300	Russia
Tikhtengen	4,618	768	Georgia / Russia
Ailama	4,547	1,067	Georgia / Russia
Tiutiun-Tau	4,540	380	Russia
Jailik	4,533	926	Russia
Salinan	4,508	621	Russia
Tebulosmta	4,499	2,145	Georgia / Russia
Mount Bazardüzü	4,466	2,454	Azerbaijan / Russia
Mount Shan	4,451	1,775	Georgia / Russia
Tepli	4,431	1,144	Russia
Diklo	4,285	843	Georgia / Russia
Mount Shahdagh	4,243	1,102	Azerbaijan
Gora Addala; Shukgelmezr	4,152	1,792	Russia
Gora Dyultydag	4,127	1,834	Russia
Aragats	4,090	2,143	Armenia
Deavgay	4,016	1,251	Russia

== Climate ==
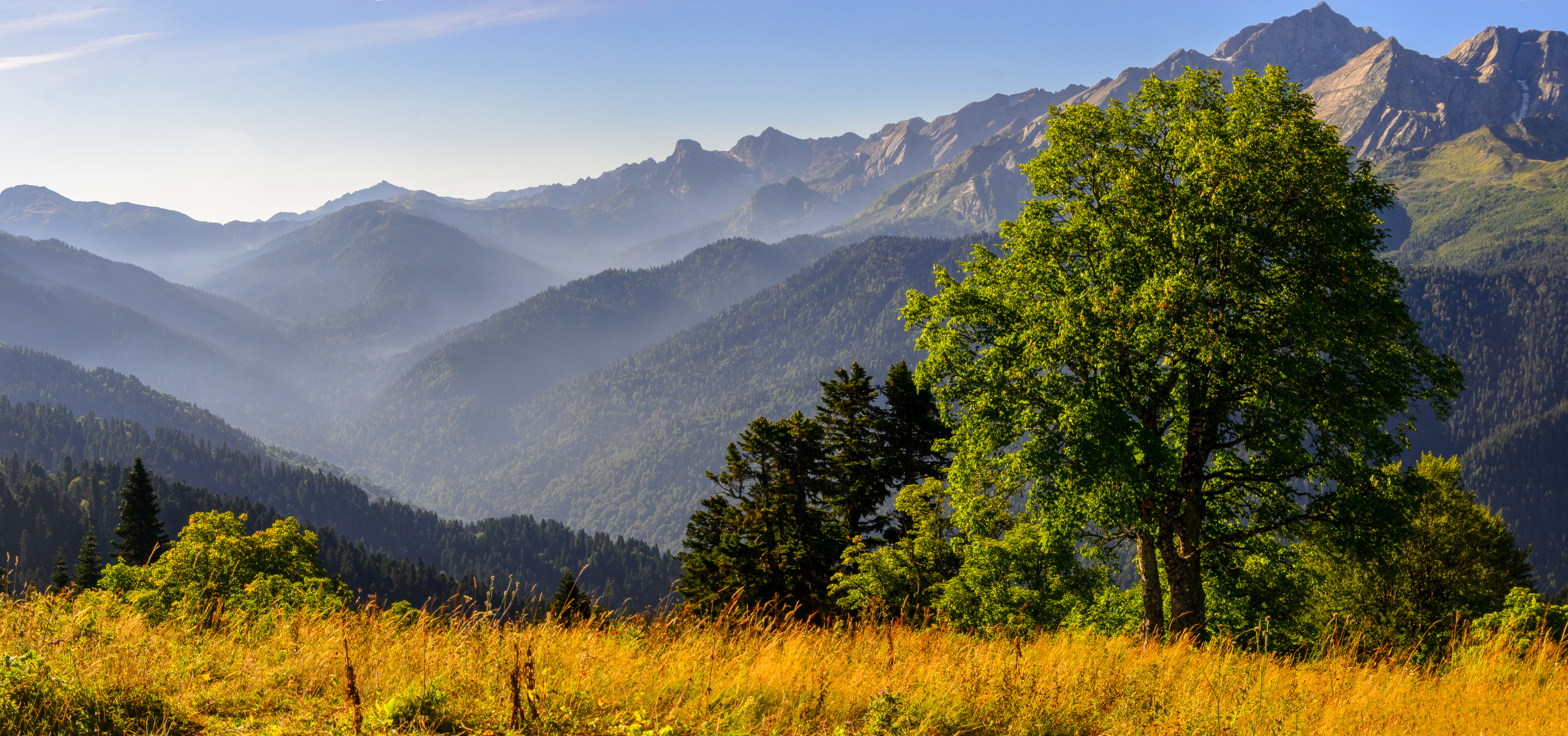
Aishkho Pass, Caucasus Nature Reserve

The climate of the Caucasus varies both vertically (according to elevation) and horizontally (by latitude and location). Temperature generally decreases as elevation rises. Average annual temperature in Sokhumi, Abkhazia at sea level is 15 °C (59 °F) while on the slopes of Mt.Kazbek at an elevation of 3,700 metres (12,100 ft), average annual temperature falls to −6.1 °C (21.0 °F). The northern slopes of the Greater Caucasus Mountain Range are 3 °C (5.4 °F) colder than the southern slopes. The highlands of the Lesser Caucasus Mountains in Armenia, Azerbaijan, and Georgia are marked by sharp temperature contrasts between the summer and winter months due to a more continental climate.

Precipitation increases from east to west in most areas. Elevation plays an important role in the Caucasus and mountains generally receive higher amounts of precipitation than low-lying areas. The north-eastern regions (Dagestan) and the southern portions of the Lesser Caucasus Mountains are the driest. The absolute minimum annual precipitation is 250 mm (9.84 in) in the northeastern Caspian Depression. Western parts of the Caucasus Mountains are marked by high amounts of precipitation. The southern slopes of the Greater Caucasus Mountain Range receive higher amounts of precipitation than the northern slopes. Annual precipitation in the Western Caucasus ranges from 1,000 to 4,000 mm (39.37–157.48 in) while in the Eastern and Northern Caucasus (Chechnya, Ingushetia, Kabardino-Balkaria, Ossetia, Kakheti, Kartli, etc.) precipitation ranges from 600 to 1,800 mm (23.62–70.87 in). The absolute maximum annual precipitation is 4,100 mm (161.42 in) around the Mount Mtirala area which lies on the Meskheti Range in Adjara. The precipitation of the Lesser Caucasus Mountain Range (Southern Georgia, Armenia, western Azerbaijan), not including the Meskheti Range, varies from 300-800 mm (31.50 in) annually.

The Caucasus Mountains are known for the high amount of snowfall, although many regions which are not located along the windward slopes do not receive nearly as much snow. This is especially true for the Lesser Caucasus Mountains which are somewhat isolated from the moist influences coming in from the Black Sea and receive considerably less precipitation (in the form of snow) than the Greater Caucasus Mountains. The average winter snow cover of the Lesser Caucasus Mountains ranges from 10 to 30 cm (3.94–11.81 in). The Greater Caucasus Mountains (especially the southwestern slopes) are marked by heavy snowfall. Avalanches are common from November to April.

Snow cover in several regions (Svaneti and northern Abkhazia) may reach 5 metres (16 ft). The Mt. Achishkho region, which is the snowiest place in the Caucasus, often records snow depths of 7 m (23 ft).

== Landscape ==
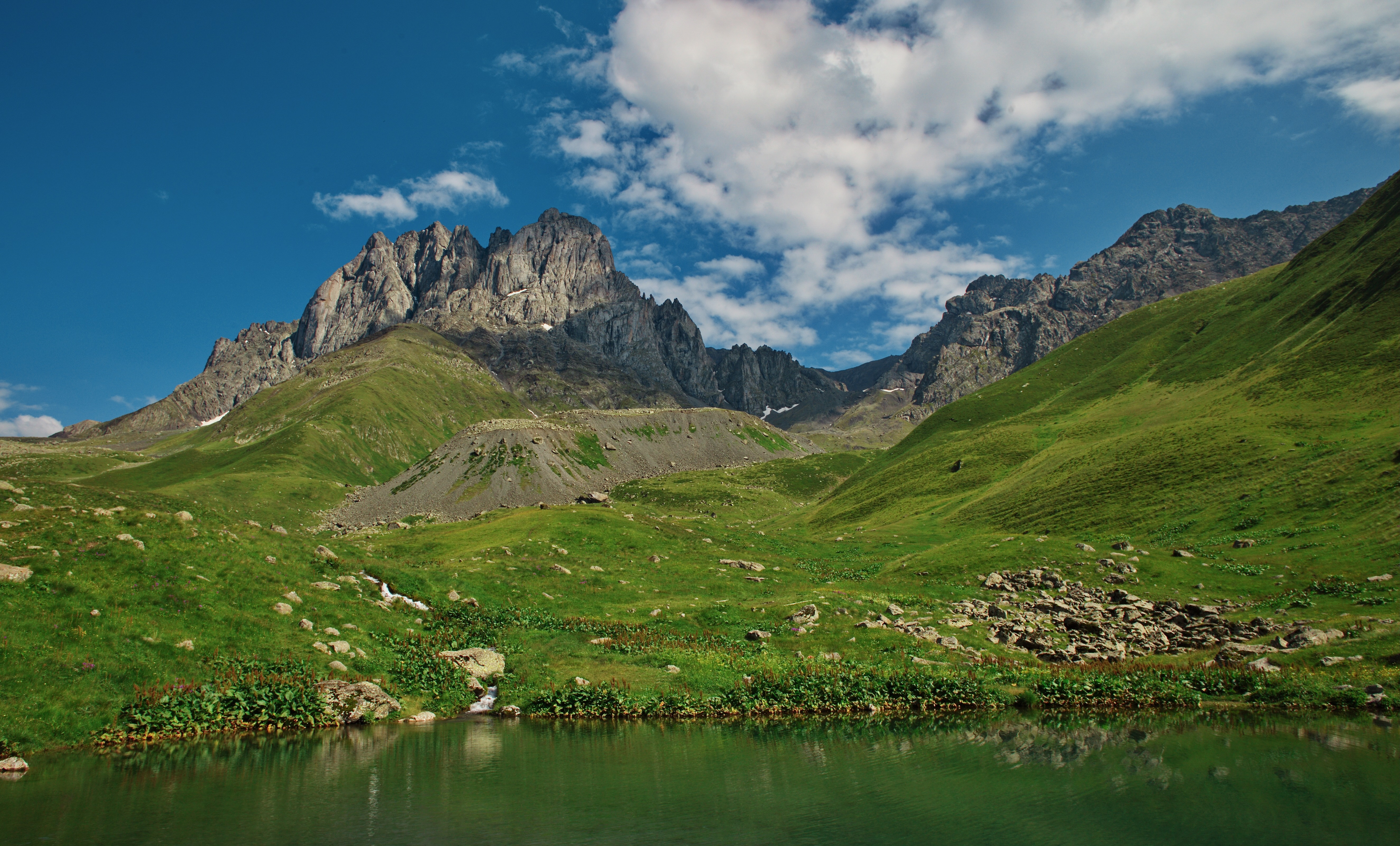
Juta Valley in Georgia, on the southern slopes of Greater Caucasus

The Caucasus Mountains have a varied landscape which changes according to elevation and distance from large bodies of water. The region contains biomes ranging from subtropical lowland marshes and forests to glaciers (Western and Central Caucasus), and highland semideserts, steppes, and alpine meadows in the south (mainly in Armenia and Azerbaijan).

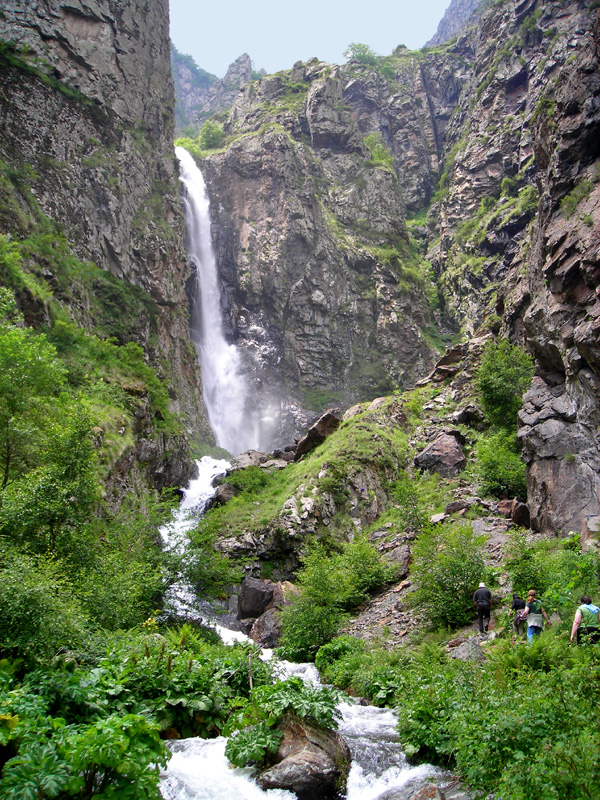
Waterfall in Georgia, part of Dariali Gorge

The northern slopes of the Greater Caucasus Mountains are covered by oak, hornbeam, maple, and ash forests at lower elevations while birch and pine forests take over at higher elevations. Some of the lowest areas of the region are covered by steppes and grasslands. The slopes of the North-western Greater Caucasus (Kabardino-Balkaria, Cherkessia, etc.) also contain spruce and fir forests. The alpine zone replaces the forest at around 2,000 metres (6,600 ft) above sea level. The permafrost/glacier line generally starts around 2,800–3,000 metres (9,200–9,800 ft). The southeastern slopes of the Greater Caucasus Mountains are covered by beech, oak, maple, hornbeam, and ash forests. Beech forests tend to dominate in higher locations. The south-western slopes of the Greater Caucasus are covered by Colchian forests (oak, buxus, beech, chestnut, hornbeam, elm) at lower elevations with coniferous and mixed forests (spruce, fir and beech) taking over at higher elevations. The alpine zone on the southern slopes may extend up to 2,800 metres (9,200 ft) above sea level while the glacier/snow line starts at 3,000–3,500 metres (9,800–11,500 ft).

The northern and western slopes of the Lesser Caucasus Mountains are characterized both by Colchian and other deciduous forests at lower elevations while mixed and coniferous forests (mainly spruce and fir) dominate at higher elevations. Beech forests are also common at higher elevations. The southern slopes of the Lesser Caucasus Mountains are largely covered by grasslands and steppes up to an elevation of 2,500 metres (8,200 ft). The highest areas of the region also contain alpine grasslands. Volcanic and other rock formations are common throughout the region. The volcanic zone extends over a large area from southern Georgia into Armenia and southwestern Azerbaijan. Some of the prominent peaks of the region include Mt. Aragats, Didi Abuli, Samsari, and others. The area is characterized by volcanic plateaus, lava flows, volcanic lakes, volcanic cones and other features. The Lesser Caucasus Mountains lack the type of glaciers and glacial features that are common on the Greater Caucasus Mountain Range.

== History ==
Crossing the Caucasus Mountain range was an important section of the northern arm of the Silk Route. Tusheti shepherds of Georgia have been herding livestock to seasonal grazing grounds, a practice known as transhumance for over 10,000 years. There was one pass on the southeast end in Derbent (known as the Caspian Gates or Gates of Alexander), and multiple passes throughout the range: Jvari Pass at 2379 m and above the Darial Gorge on the Georgian Military Road, Mamison Pass on the Ossetian Military Road at 2911 m, and Roki Tunnel at 2310 m.

== Image gallery ==
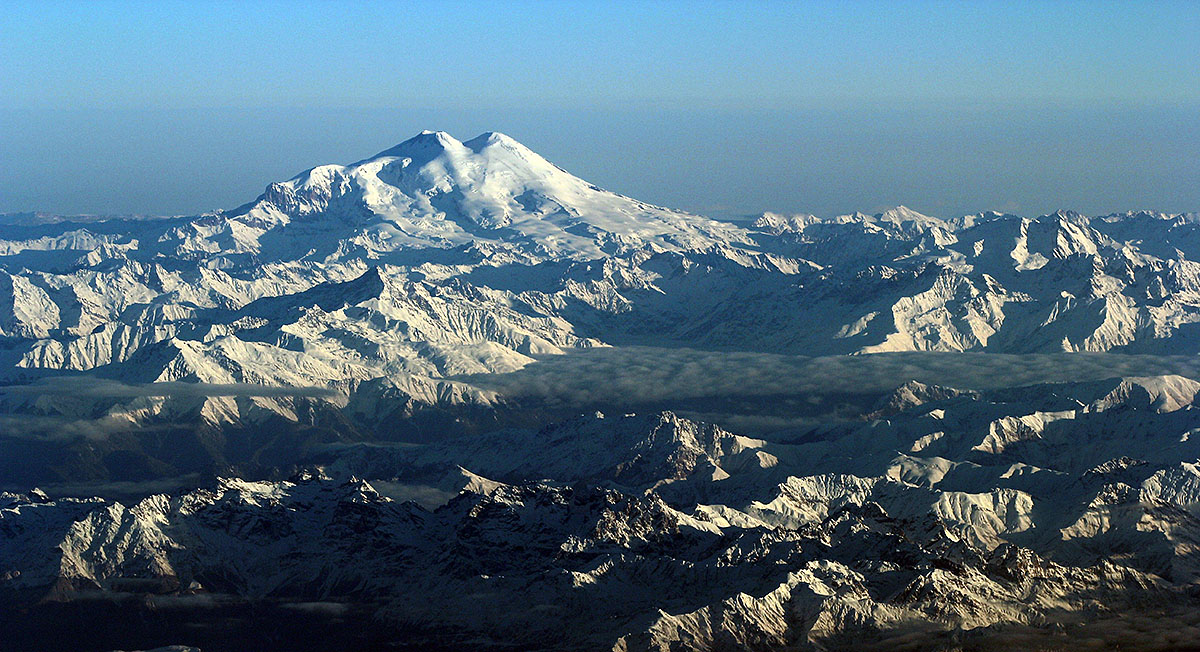
Mount Elbrus viewed from the south in Kabardino-Balkaria

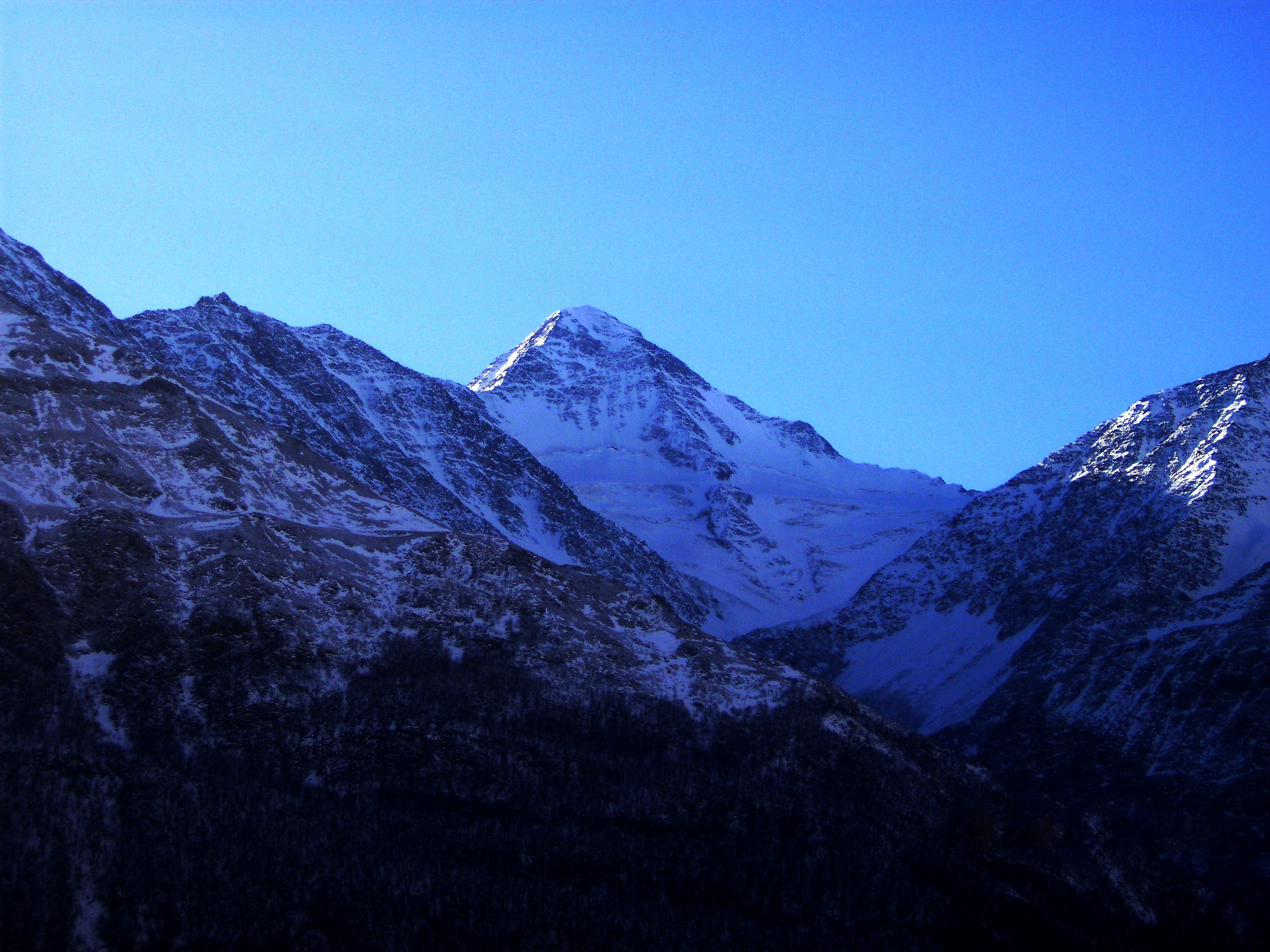
Komito Mountain in Chechnya

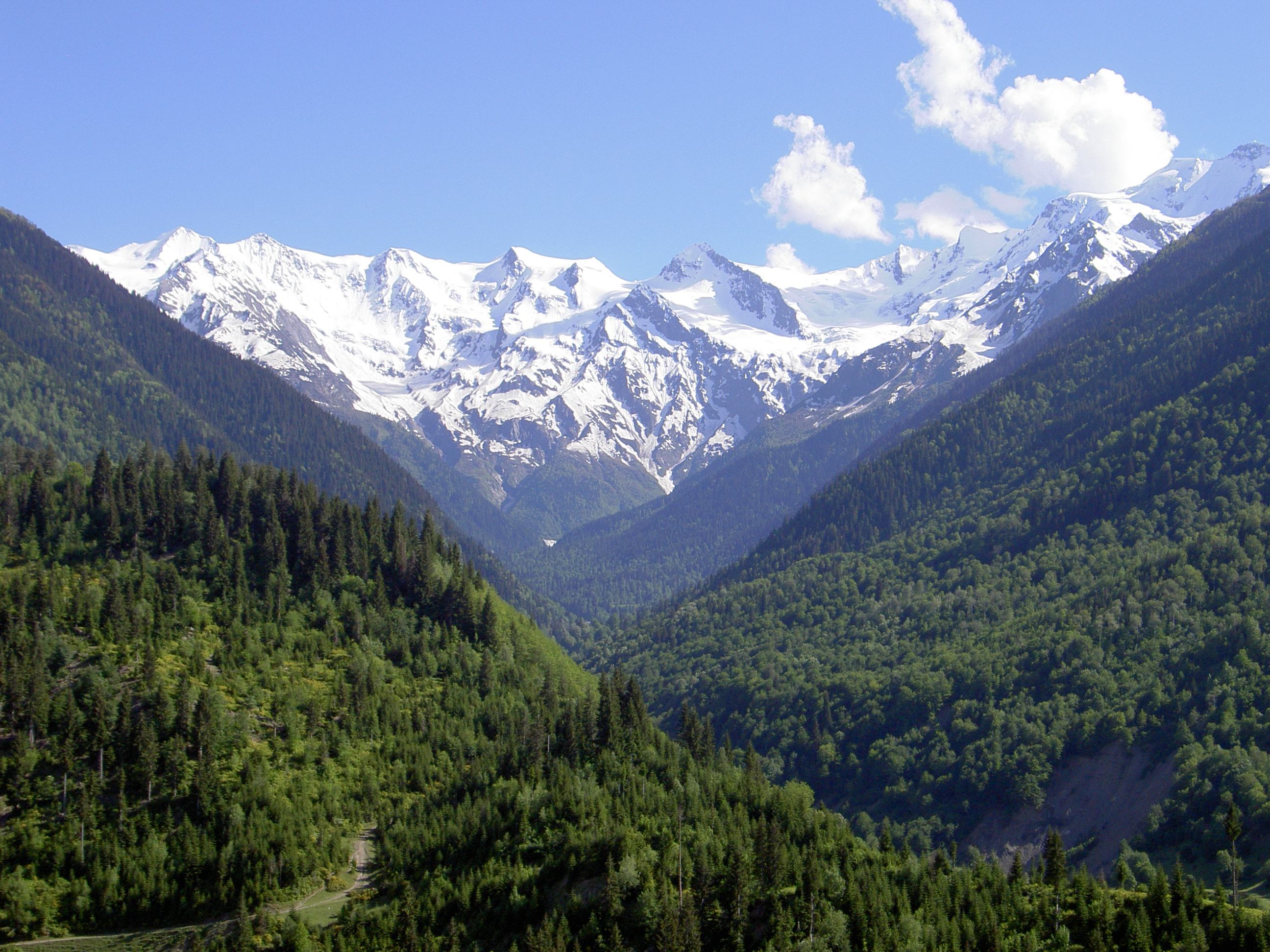
Caucasus Mountains in Svaneti, Georgia

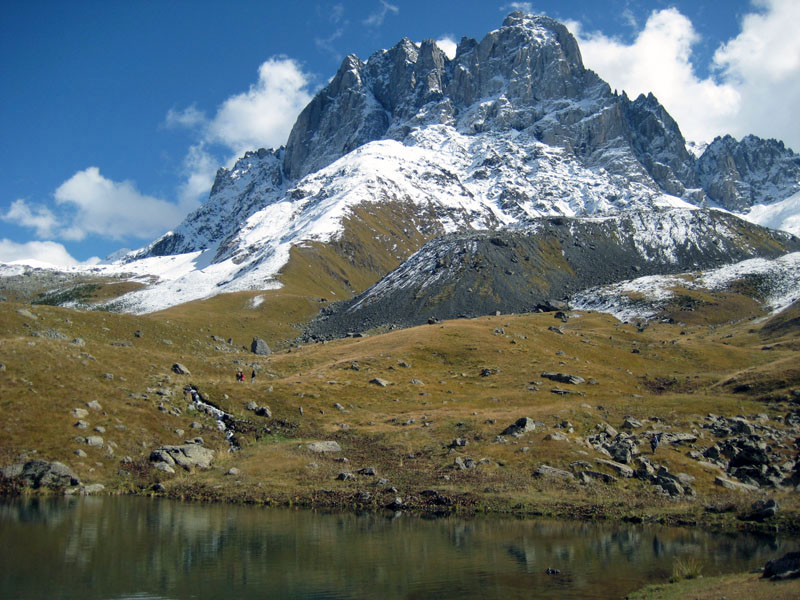
Chaukhi mountain in Khevi, Georgia

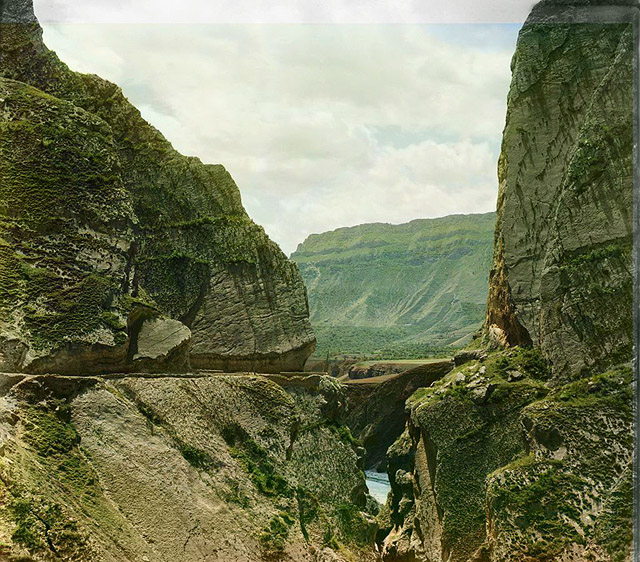
A gorge in Dagestan, Russia

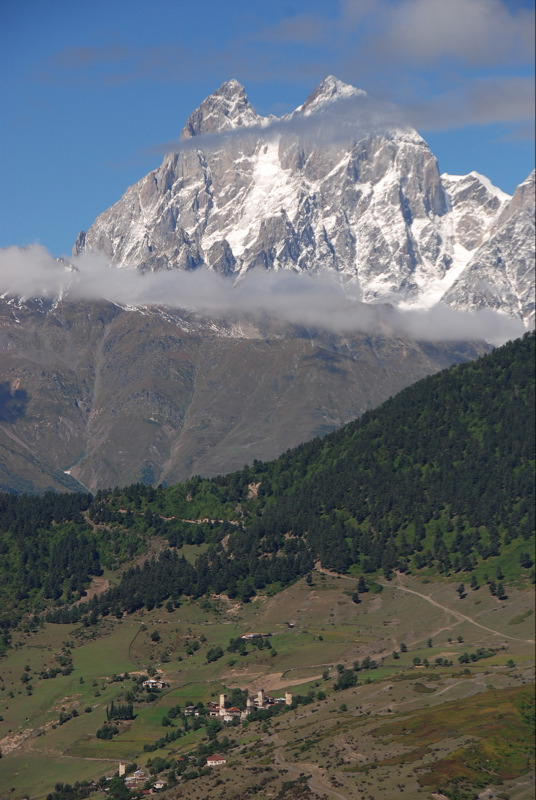
Twin-peaked Ushba in Georgia

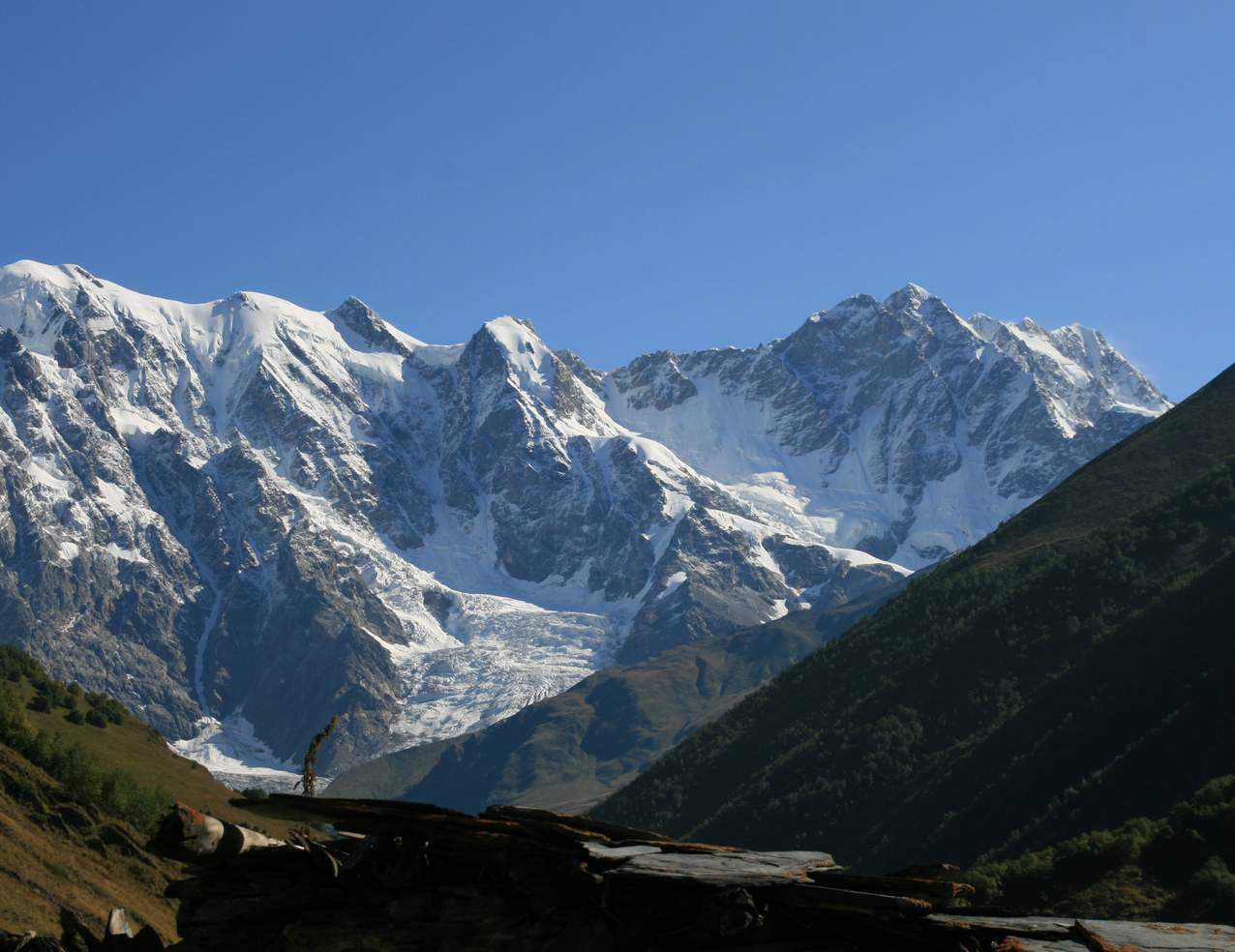
Mount Shkhara in Georgia

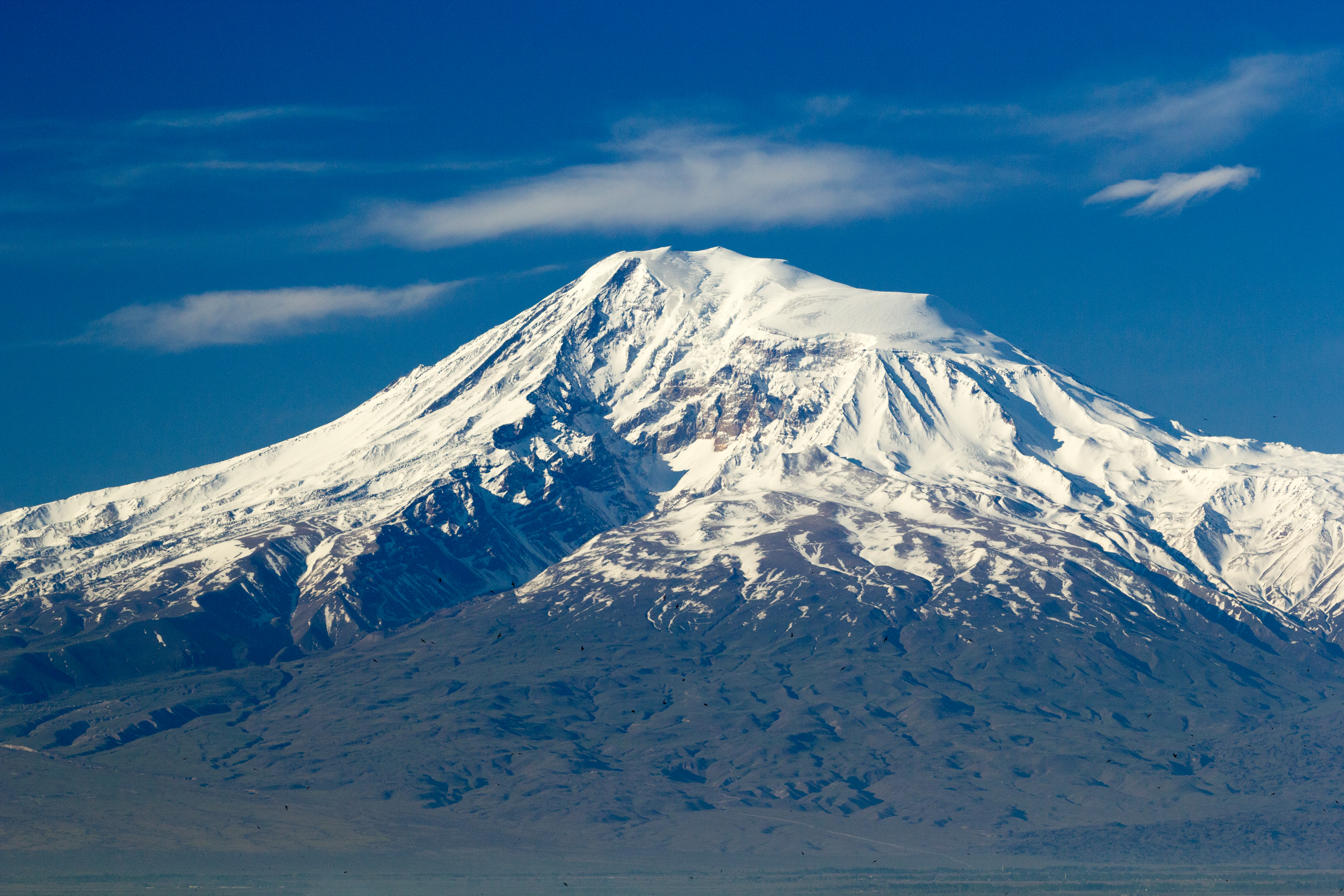
Mount Ararat in Turkey, as viewed from Yerevan, Armenia

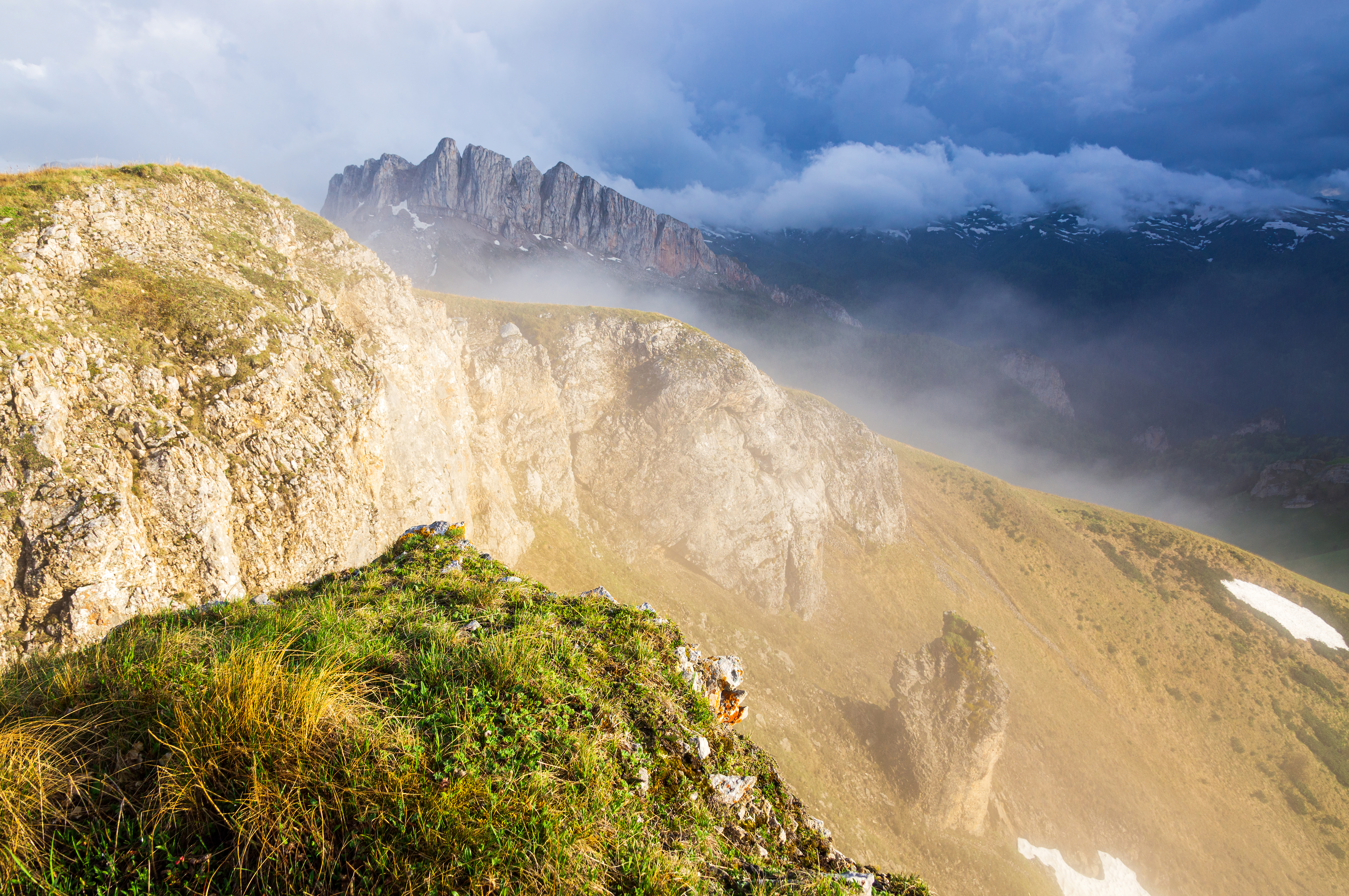
Asbestnaya Mount and Acheshbok Mount, Russia

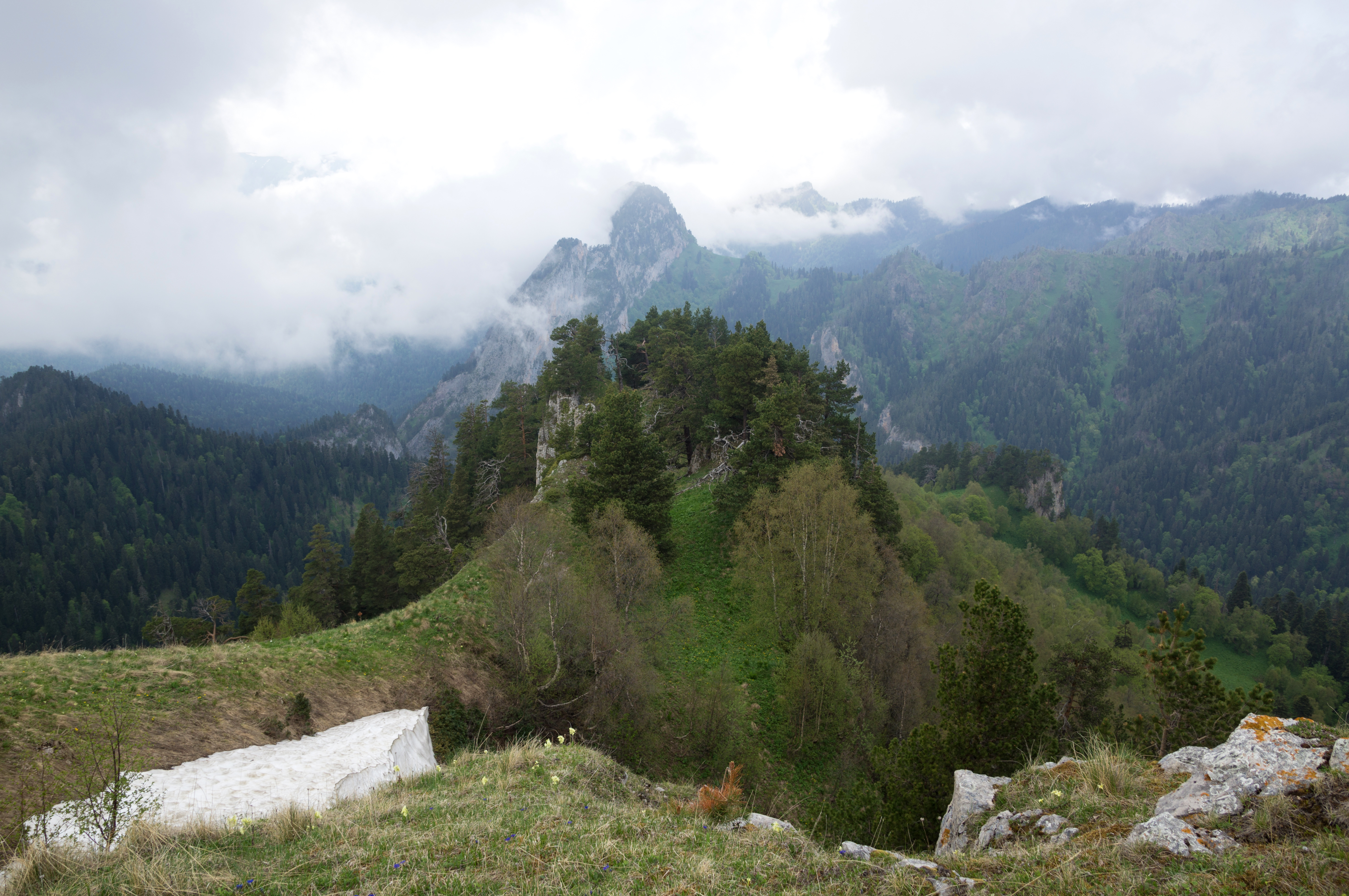
Bolshoy Tkhach Park, Russia

== See also ==
- Zagros Mountains
- Black Mountains
