= Samsari Range =

Mountain range in Georgia

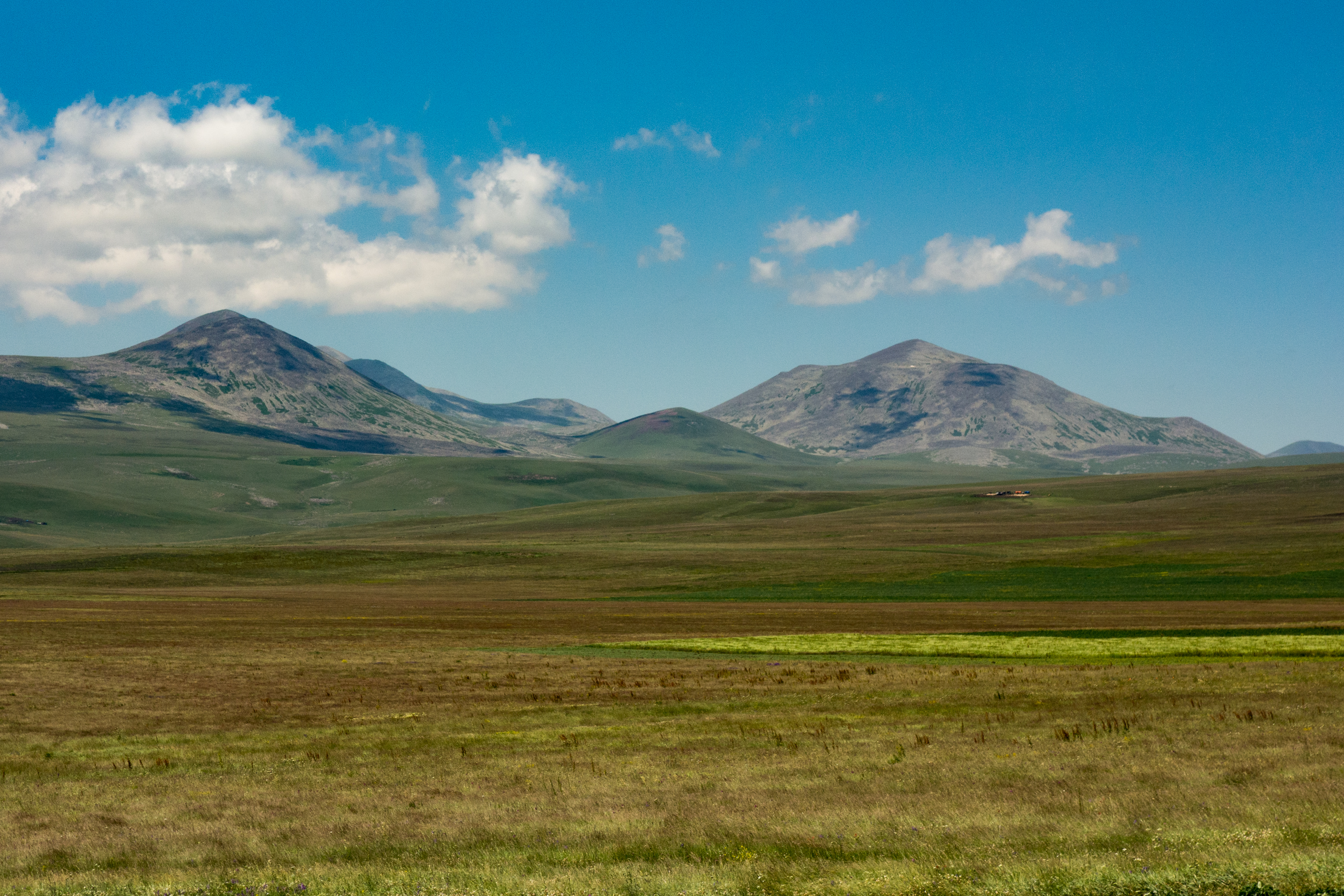

Highest point
- Peak: Didi Abuli
- Elevation: 3,301 m (10,830 ft)

Dimensions
- Length: 42 km (26 mi) N-S
- Width: 20–22 km (12–14 mi)

Geography
- Location within Georgia
- Country: Georgia
- Range coordinates: 41°31′30″N 43°41′00″E
- Parent range: Caucasus Mountains

Samsari Range (Georgian: სამსრის ქედი) is a volcanic range in southern Georgia, 120 km (75 mi) to the southwest of Tbilisi. It is a part of the Highland of Southern Georgia and rises above the Javakheti and Tsalka Plateaus. The range itself is 42 km (26 mi) long and runs north to south from the Ktsia to the Paravani River Gorges. There is archaeological evidence of ancient forts on some of the peaks.

== Mountains ==
The highest mountain is Didi Abuli at an elevation of 3,301 m (10,830 ft) above sea level. Other notable peaks include:

- Godorebi (3,189 m or 10,463 ft)
- Karakuzei (2,672 m or 8,766 ft)
- Shavnabada (2,929 m or 9,610 ft)
- Samsari (3,285 m or 10,778 ft)
- Mt. Tavkvetili (2,583 m or 8,474 ft)
- Western Shaori (2,921 m or 9,583 ft)

Mount Samsari has a fairly large caldera, the floor of which is covered by the rocks from the mountain's last eruption.

== Vegetation ==
The slopes of the Abul-Samsari Range are mainly covered with alpine meadows and grasslands. Forests are less common and are usually found at the lowest elevations of the Range (below 1,900 m or 6,234 ft above sea level).

There are numerous small and medium-sized lakes in and around the Abul-Samsari Range.

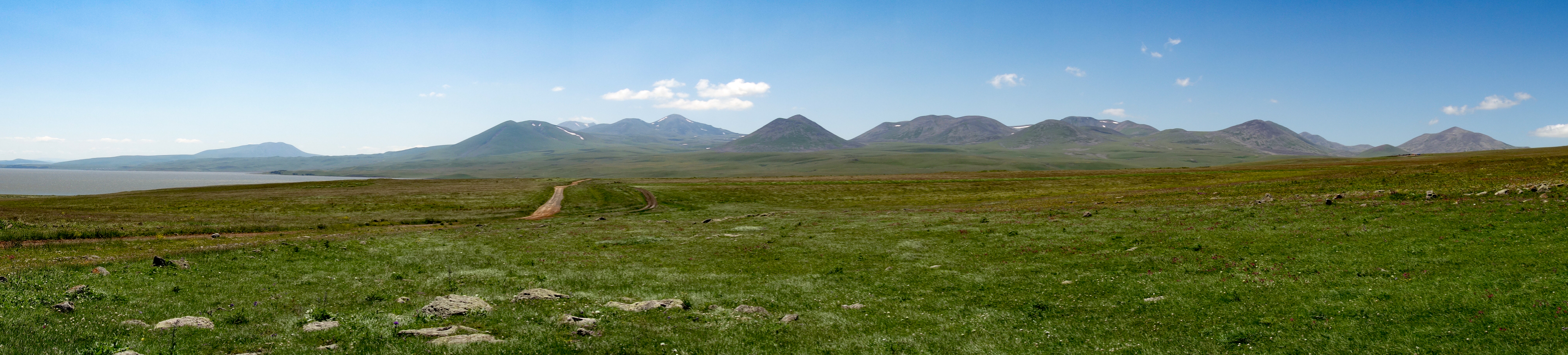
Samsari Range as seen from the northern shore of Lake Paravani

== See also ==
- Mount Didi Abuli
- Javakheti Range
- Javakheti Plateau
- Lesser Caucasus
