= Erzi Nature Reserve =

Nature reserve in Ingushetia, Russia

- Russian: Эрзи заповедник (Also: Erzee)
- IUCN category Ia (strict nature reserve)
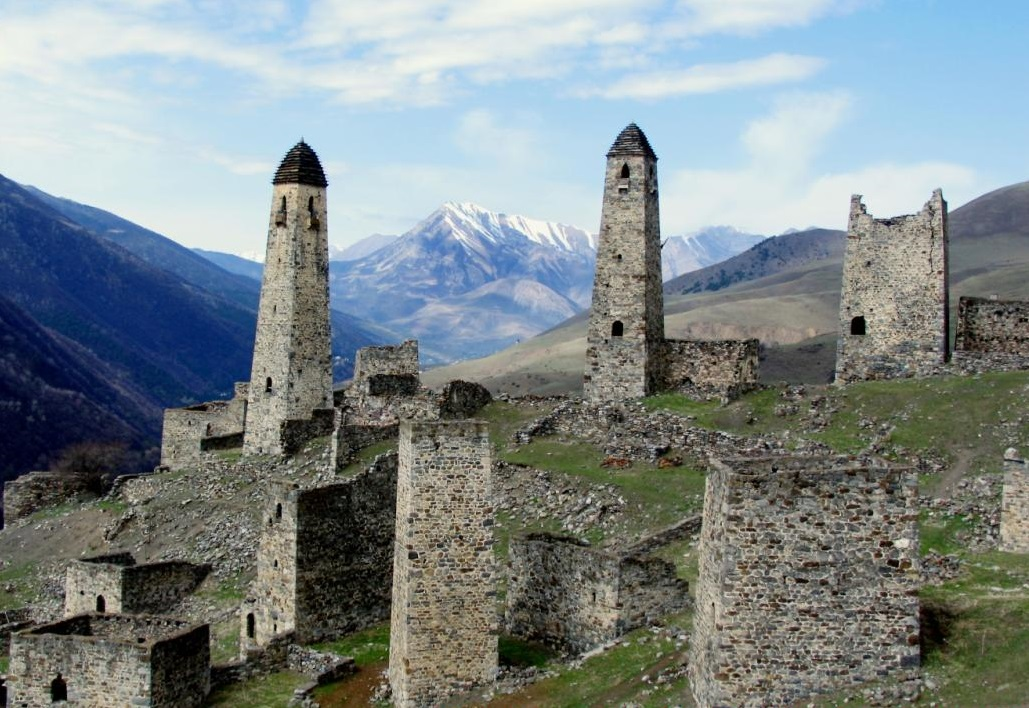
- Erzi Zapovednik

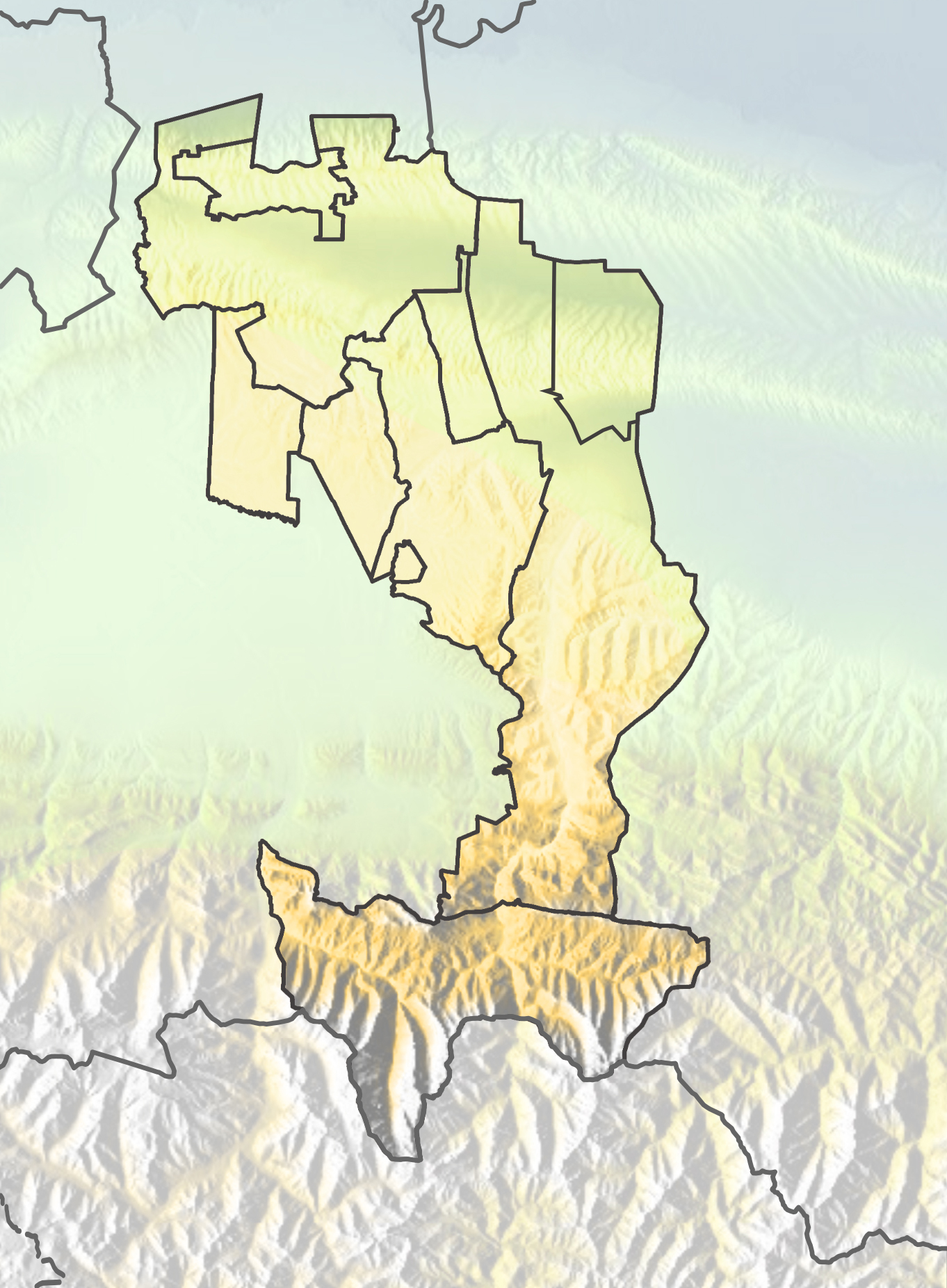
- Location within Republic of Ingushetia Location within Caucasus Mountains Location within European Russia
- Location: Ingushetia
- Nearest city: Nazran
- Coordinates: 42°45′0″N 45°0′0″E
- Area: 5,970 hectares (14,752 acres; 23 sq mi)
- Established: 2000
- Governing body: Ministry of Natural Resources and Environment (Russia)
- Website: http://www.erziri.ru/

Erzi Nature Reserve (Russian: Эрзи заповедник) (also Erzee) is a Russian 'zapovednik' (strict nature reserve) located on the northern slope of the Greater Caucasus in the Dzheyrahsky Assinsky-basin, adjacent to the Skalisty Range (a chain of mid-height mountains that runs parallel to the main ridge of the Caucasus, but just to the north). Rivers in the reserve include the Assa and Armkhi that feed into the Terek River. The northern third of the territory is forested, the ridge area is alpine meadows and mountain steppe. Over 160 historical and cultural sites are also protected by the reserve - martial towers, temples, necropolis tracts, sacred groves, and structures from ancient, medieval and later cultures, many of the Ingush people. The reserve is situated in the Dzheyrakhsky District of Ingushetia.

== Topography ==
The Erzi Reserve is in mountainous terrain on the north slope of the Caucasus. The Assa River and the Armkhi River run south to north through the reserve (the Assa is the western border), on their way to the Terek River which flows into the Caspian Sea to the east. Through the reserve just north of the main ridge (which is of shales and sandstones) of the Caucasus runs a lower, parallel ridge of carbonate rock called the "Rocky Ridge" (ru:Скалистый хребет (Кавказ)). The depression between the main ridge and the Rocky Ridge is called the "north Jura". The landscape features mountain range spurs over deep river valleys, steep south slopes and gently sloping northern slopes. 2% of the reserve is rock and glacier above 3,500 meters.

== Climate and Ecoregion ==
Erzi is located in the Caucasus mixed forests ecoregion. This ecoregion is located along the Caucasus Mountains between the Black Sea and the Caspian Sea. One of the highest levels of species endemism and diversity in the world: 23% of vascular species, and 10% of vertebrates.

The climate of Erzi is Humid continental climate, cool summer (Köppen climate classification (Dfc)). This climate is characterised by long cold winters, and short, cool summers. In the Erzi reserve, altitude is the driver of local climate: below 2,000 meters the climate is warm and dry; above 2,000 meters it is cold and wet. The average number of days of precipitation is 113 days per year. Summer rains tend to be heavy and violent, due to rising thermal air current. The average temperature in January is −1.4 °C (29.5 °F), in July it is 26.4 °C (79.5 °F).

== Flora and fauna ==
About one-third of the reserve is forested, mostly on the lower north slopes. The forests are mostly oak (on the Rocky Ridge and depression to 800 meters), and beech (to 1,500 meters) communities. Underbrush at the mid-level include sea buckthorn (Hippophae), willow, gray alder, and in places extensive hazel. Approaching the sub-alpine zone the brush features Caucasian rhododendron. Above 2,000 meters but below the alpine zone at 2,500 meters is a belt of mountain forest-steppe: wheatgrass-wormwood-cereal xerophytic steppes on shallow meadow soils.

The animal life of the reserve is still being inventories and studied, as the reserve is one of the newest in the system. As of 2016, 115 species of birds had been recorded, 60 species of mammals (15 of which were hooved, 10 were bats, and 20 were rodents).

== Ecoeducation and access ==
As a strict nature reserve, the Erzi Reserve is mostly closed to the general public, although scientists and those with 'environmental education' purposes can make arrangements with park management for visits. There are half a dozen well-developed 'ecotourist' routes in the reserve, however, that are open to the public. Accommodations are available in buffer zones outside the park, and some excursions have daily bus service to the trail heads. Permits must be obtained in advance. The main office is in the city of Nazran.

== See also ==
- List of Russian Nature Reserves (class 1a 'zapovedniks')
- National Parks of Russia
