= Tumsoy-Lam (mountain) =

Mountain in Chechnya, Russia

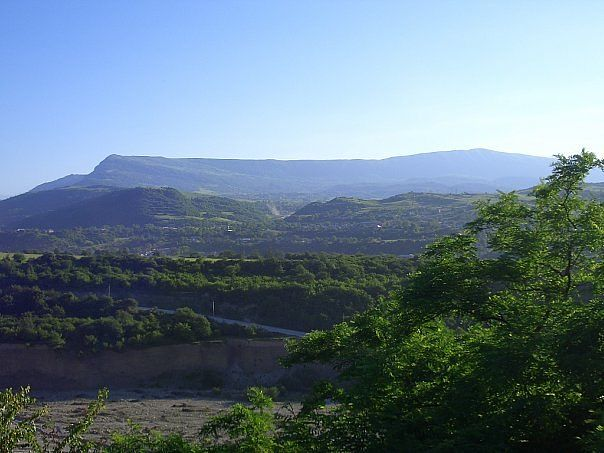

Highest point
- Elevation: 2,072 m (6,798 ft)
- Coordinates: 42°50′15″N 45°32′41″E

Geography
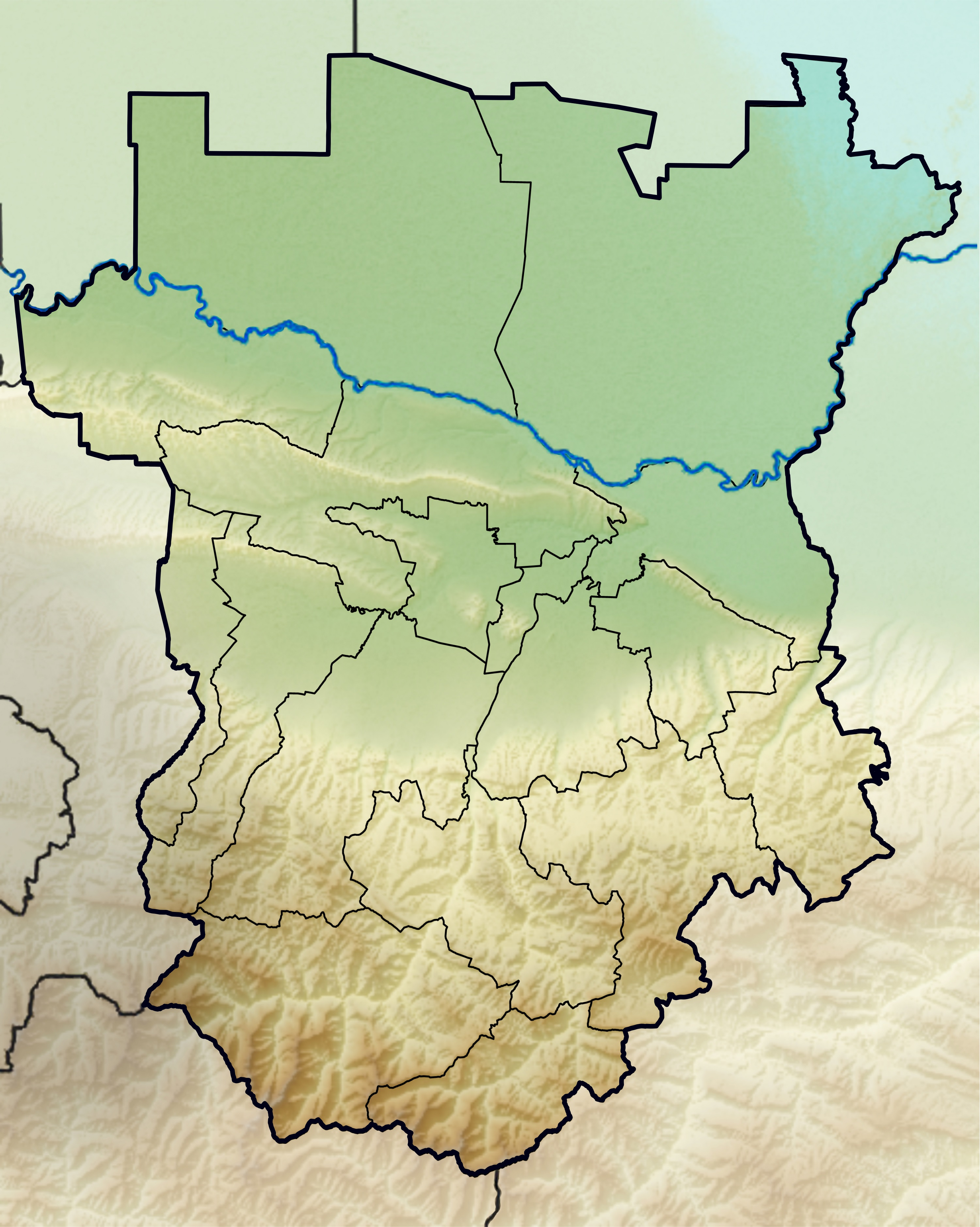
- Location within Chechnya Location within Russia
- Country: Russia
- Region: Chechnya

Tumsoy-Lam mountain (Chechen: Тумсойн лам), also known as Alpiyskoye (Russian: Альпийское), is a mountain peak located in the Argun Gorge on the border of the Shatoysky and Itum-Kalinsky districts of the Chechen Republic. It is situated in the eastern part of the Greater Caucasus, between the Martan and Argun rivers, with the elevation of 2072 metres, according to other sources - 2074 metres, 1855 metres. The mountain extends for 10 versts to the west-northwest. Tumsoy-Lam (Tumsoy Mountain) is the ancestral mountain of the Chechen Tumsoy Teip.

== Geographical description ==
The mountain is located on the opposite side of the main gorge on the plateau, with gentle slopes descending to the north from the Tumsoy-Lam ridge to the east. Its length along the ridge is 11 kilometres, stretching from the sources of the Martan River to the Argun. It rises above several villages, including Borzoy, Tumsoy, Enisty, Khurikoi, and Baskha.

The Caucasus Department of the Imperial Russian Geographical Society makes reference to the mountain:

"On the opposite side of the main gorge, the Chechen villages of Tsogunoy, Vashenderoy, Bardoy and others are scattered across the plateau and gentle slopes descending northwards from the Tumsoy-Lam ridge; around and between them there is no forest at all: it has long since been cleared to make way for farmland."

== History ==
In 1944, the Chechens and Ingush were deported and the Chechen-Ingush ASSR was liquidated. As a result, the Tumsoy-Lam mountain was renamed Alpiyskoye Mountain.

On 3 August 1873, the Russian naturalist, statistician, and ethnographer Nikolay Zeidlitz passed through the Tumsoy-Lam mountain. The village of Tumsoy and the Tumsoy-Lam mountain are recorded in Pagirev's index. The mountain is marked as Tumsoy-Lam in the news of the Caucasian department of the Imperial Russian Geographical Society for 1873.

A dwelling tower is situated at the base of Tumsoy-Lam mountain, on the steep bank of the Tumsoy-Akhk River. The tower occupies a naturally fortified cape formed by the flow of the river and neighbouring girders. Belonging to the Tumsoy Teip, the Tumsoy tower is approximately 5 metres in height and was likely constructed in the 16th century.

The Vatan-Kort burial ground is located on the eastern spur of the Tumsoy-Lam mountain. At its summit, which is 1.5 km south of the village of Tumsoy and above a multi-metre chasm to the Argun River, there are stone boxes used for burials. Unfortunately, the burial ground is being destroyed by both nature and local residents. In 1964, historians V.B. Vinogradov and M.X. Oshaev opened one of the stone boxes. The burial site appears to be identical to the Borzoy site and is dated to the 13th-15th centuries. It is likely that it belongs to the same tribe as the Borzoy site, based on the ritual and inventory.

The Vatan-Kort settlement's remains can be found in the vicinity of the burial ground, and partly within its borders. Its dwellings seem to have been a preferred type of saklia, featuring a flat roof supported by a rock. Ceramic discoveries reveal late types of pottery that are similar to modern ones. However, the settlement's exact date cannot be determined, as the knowledgeable local inhabitants are unable to provide an accurate time frame. The site was surveyed in 1964 by V.B. Vinogradov and M.X. Oshaev, and it is believed to date back to the 17th-18th centuries.

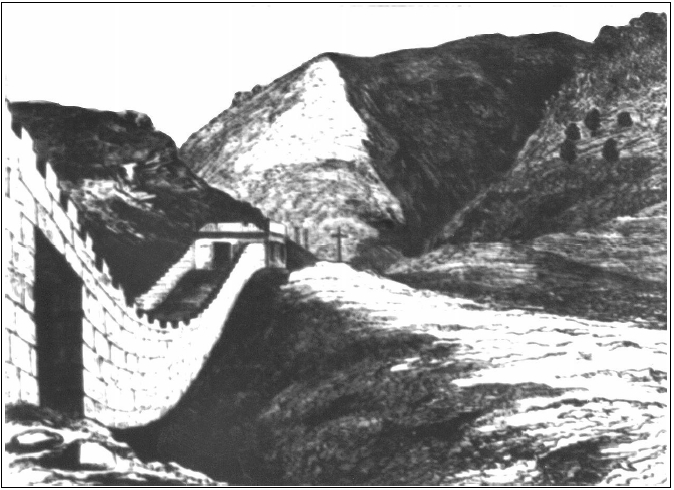
Northern facade of the Shatoev fortress in 1858. Photographic reproduction of a drawing by an unknown author published in 1869. In the distant background, in the centre, is the eastern end of the Tumsoy-Lam massif, along which lay Nikolay Zeidlitz's route to Peshkhoy and Khaibakh auls and Lake Galanchezh.

In 2019, Chechnya hosted a festival called 'Tumsoy - Lam 2019'.

=== Legend ===
Khalid Oshayev's record of the legend of Seska Solsa mentions the Tumsoy-Lam mountain:

The legend of Seska Solsa, recorded by K. Oshayev, also records the memory of this Chechen hero. There is a village called Pyosha on the Tumsoy mountain, on the road to Galanchozh. Not far from this village, on Tumsoy Mountain, there is a rock on which Seska Solsa is said to have struck with his sword. This rock is as high as a house. There is no other stone around it, just grass, and it is said that Seska Solsa cut it while testing the sharpness of his sword. There is another place not far from here. There is an opening like a pit that could fit a saccharu head. It is said that this hole was made by the hoof of Seska Solsa's horse, and that it is covered with earth so that "no foot of man or animal can fall into it".

== Gallery ==
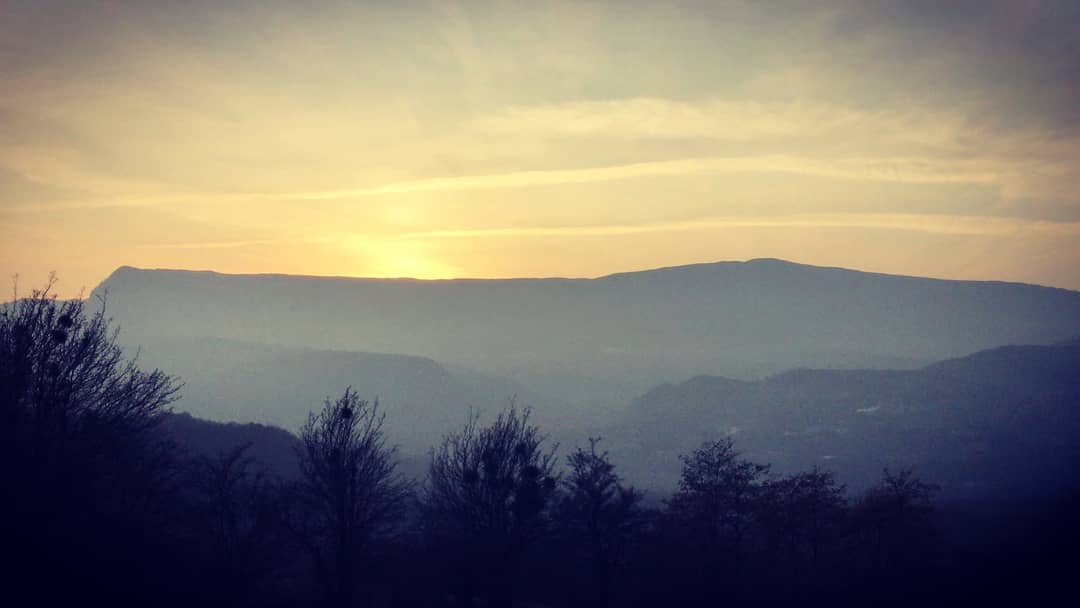
Tumsoy-Lam mountain

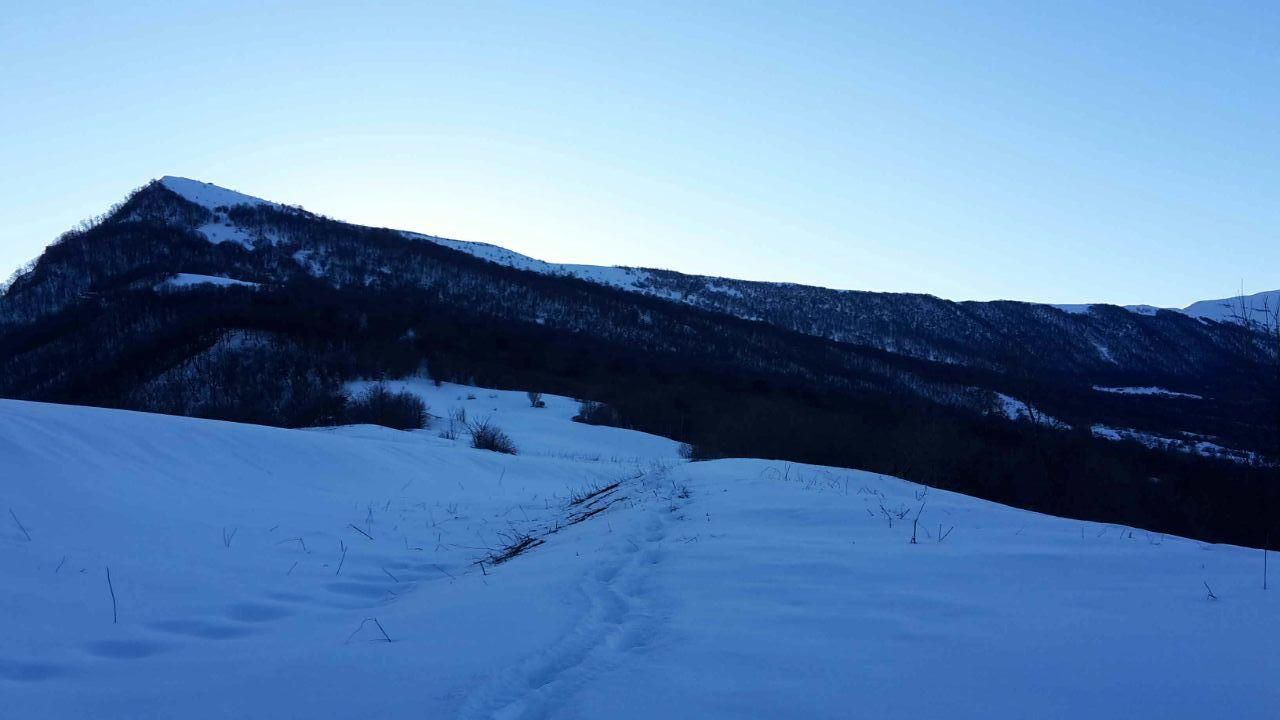
A part of the Tumsoy-Lam mountain in winter

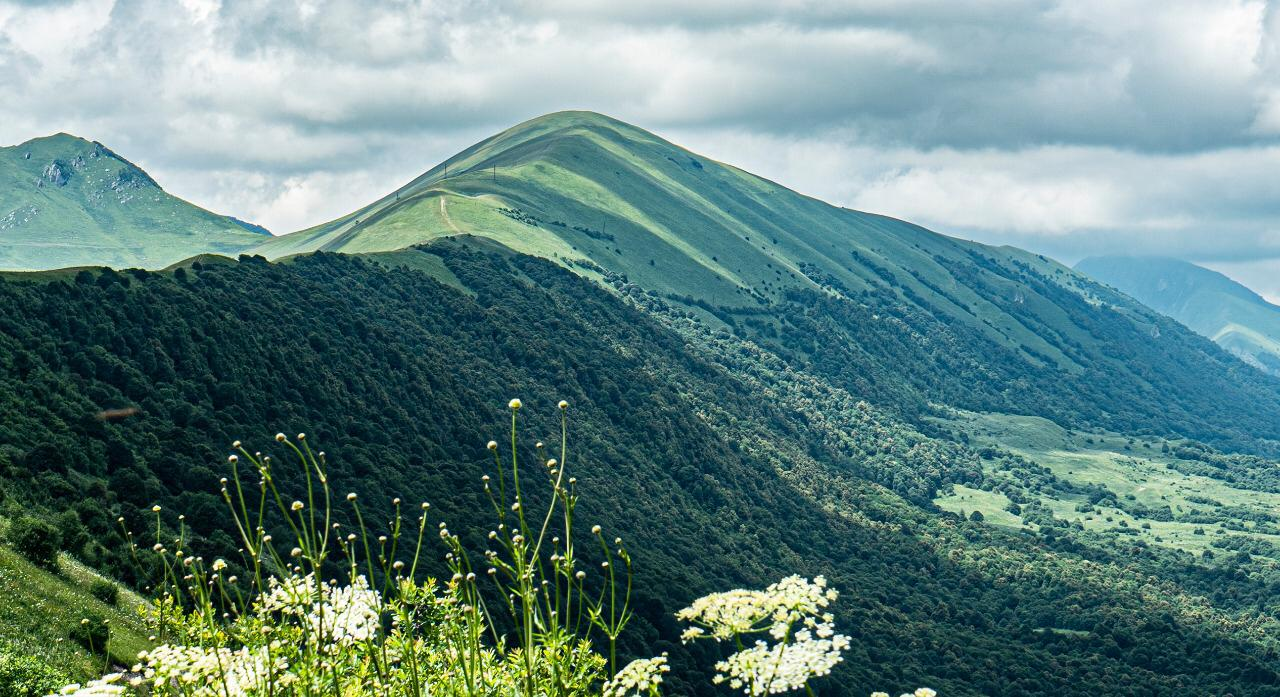
Tumsoy-Lam, Gums taӀan court (Chechen: Гумс таьӀан корт)

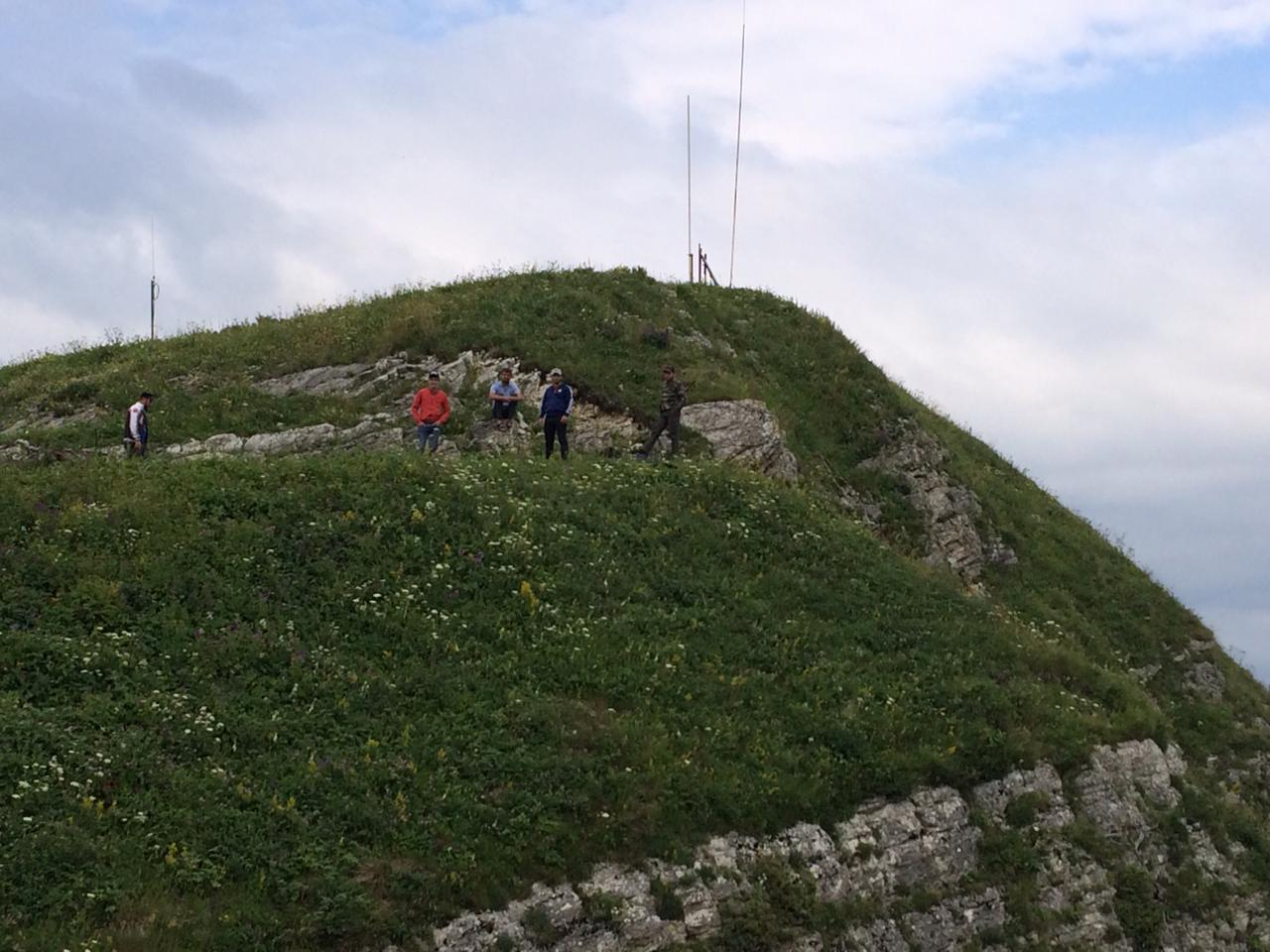
Tumsoy-Lam, BӀovs court (Chechen: БӀовс корт)

== Bibliography ==
- Иванов, М.А. (1904). Известия Кавказского отдела Русского географического общества (in Russian). Vol. 17. Тифлис. p. 68.
- Виноградов, В.Б.; Марковин, В.И. (1966). Археологические памятники ЧИАССР (in Russian). Grozny: Чеч.-Инг. кн. изд.
- Очерки истории Чечено-Ингушской АССР: с древнейших времен до наших дней (in Russian). Vol. 1. Чечено-Ингушский научно-исследовательский институт истории, языка, литературы и экономики. Чечено-Ингушское книжное изд-во. 1972.
- Далгат, У.Б. (1972). Далгат У.Б. Героический эпос чеченцев и ингушей (in Russian). Наука.
- Кушева, Е.Н. (1963). Народы Северного Кавказа и их связи с Россией (вторая половина XVI — 30-е годы XVII века) (in Russian). Ред. изд-ва И. У. Будовниц (АН СССР. Институт истории ed.). Moscow: Изд-во АН СССР.
- Музаев, Т.М. (1999). Чеченский кризис-99: политическое противостояние в Ичкерии: расстановка сил, хроника, факты (in Russian). Moscow: Панорама.
- Сулейманов, А.С. (2006). Бураев, Т.И. (ed.). Топонимия Чечни (in Russian). Grozny: ГУП "Книжное издательство". ISBN 5-98896-002-2.
- Головлёв, А.А. (2007). "Некоторые биологические и географические термины и топонимы на чеченском языке" (PDF). КРАТКИЕ СООБЩЕНИЯ Самарская Лука. 16: 9.
- Мурдалов, М. (2018). Кавказская Швейцария Chechnya (in Russian). ISBN 978-5-4490-4198-2.
- Вагапова, А.Б. (2018). "Особенности геоморфологического строения горных районов чеченской республики". МИНИСТЕРСТВО ОБРАЗОВАНИЯ И НАУКИ РФ ВОРОНЕЖСКИЙ ГОСУДАРСТВЕННЫЙ ПЕДАГОГИЧЕСКИЙ УНИВЕРСИТЕТ МОРДОВСКИЙ ГОСУДАРСТВЕННЫЙ УНИВЕРСИТЕТ им. Н.П. Огарева ПЕНЗЕНСКИЙ ГОСУДАРСТВЕННЫЙ УНИВЕРСИТЕТ МЕЖОТРАСЛЕВОЙ НАУЧНО-ИНФОРМАЦИОННЫЙ ЦЕНТР ОБРАЗОВАНИЕ РОССИИ И АКТУАЛЬНЫЕ ВОПРОСЫ СОВРЕМЕННОЙ НАУКИ Всероссийская научно-практическая конференция Сборник статей (PDF) (in Russian). Penza: ИЦ ПГАУ.
- Музаев, Т.М. (1999). Чеченский кризис-99: политическое противостояние в Ичкерии: расстановка сил, хроника, факты (in Russian). Moscow: Панорама.
