= Tavkvetili =

Mountain in Georgia

Tavkvetili თავკვეთილი
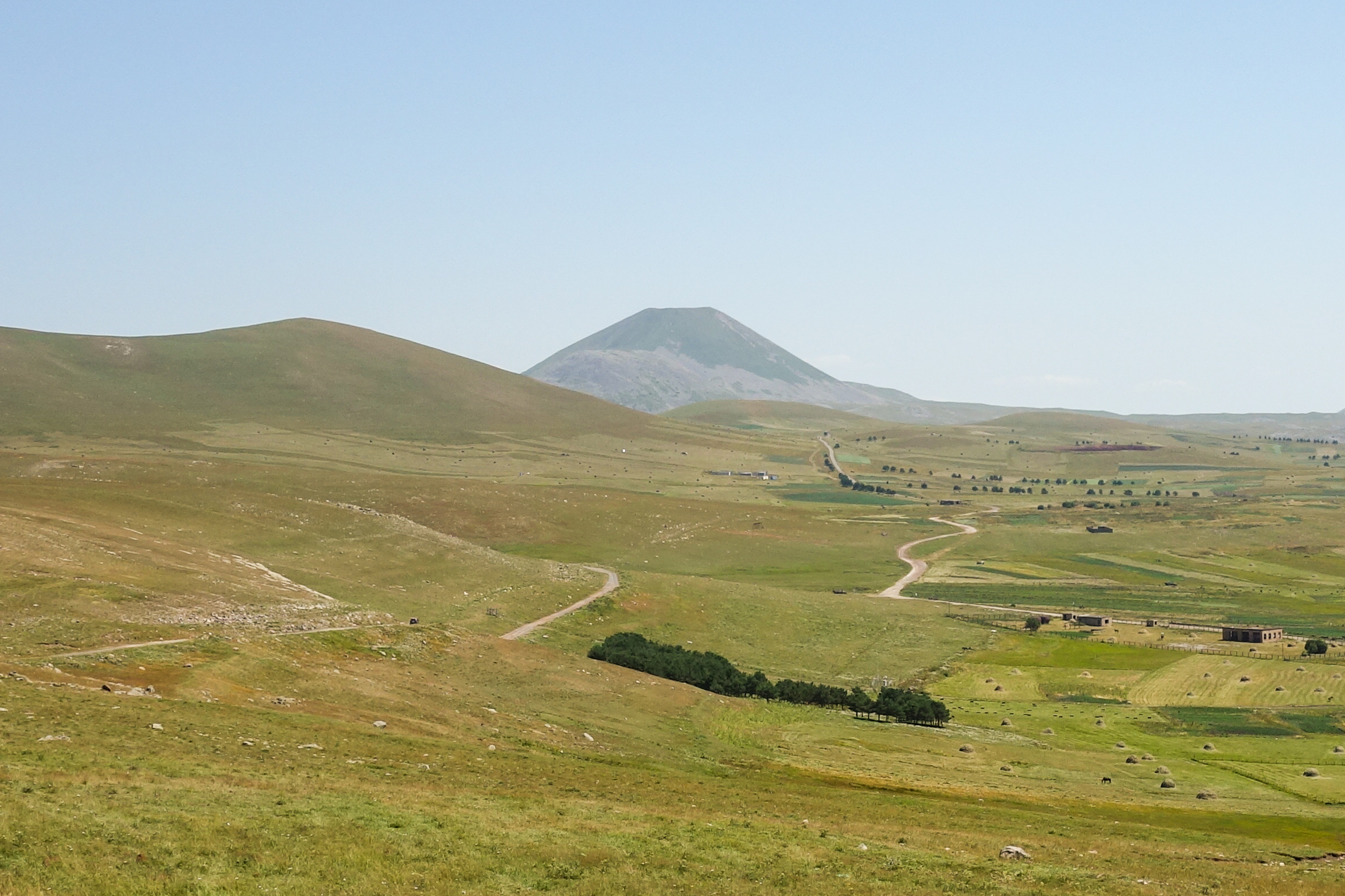
- Tavkvetili seen from the village of Tabatskuri

Highest point
- Elevation: 2,583 m (8,474 ft)
- Coordinates: 41.6811°N 43.7214°E

Geography
- Location within Samtskhe-Javakheti Location within Georgia
- Location: Georgia
- Parent range: Abul-Samsari Range

Geology
- Rock age: Late Pleistocene
- Mountain type: Stratovolcano
- Rock type(s): Andesite and dacite
- Last eruption: 8—18 ka ago

Mount Tavkvetili (Georgian: თავკვეთილი) is a volcanic mountain in the northern part of the Abul-Samsari Range in the Samtskhe-Javakheti and Kvemo Kartli region of Southern Georgia. It is also known as Gora Tavk'vetili and Mta Tavk'vetili. The elevation of the mountain is 2,583 metres (8,474 ft) above sea level and is the 323rd highest mountain in Georgia. The mountain has the shape of a decapitated cone and is composed of young andesitic and andesitic-dacitic lavas. The lower slopes of Mount Tavkvetili are covered by subalpine meadows while the upper slopes are covered by alpine meadows.

== Natural disasters ==
Mount Tavkvetili has destructive earthquakes around once every 50 years that rank over a 7 on the Richter magnitude scale.
