= Shavnabada (Samsari) =

Mountain in Georgia

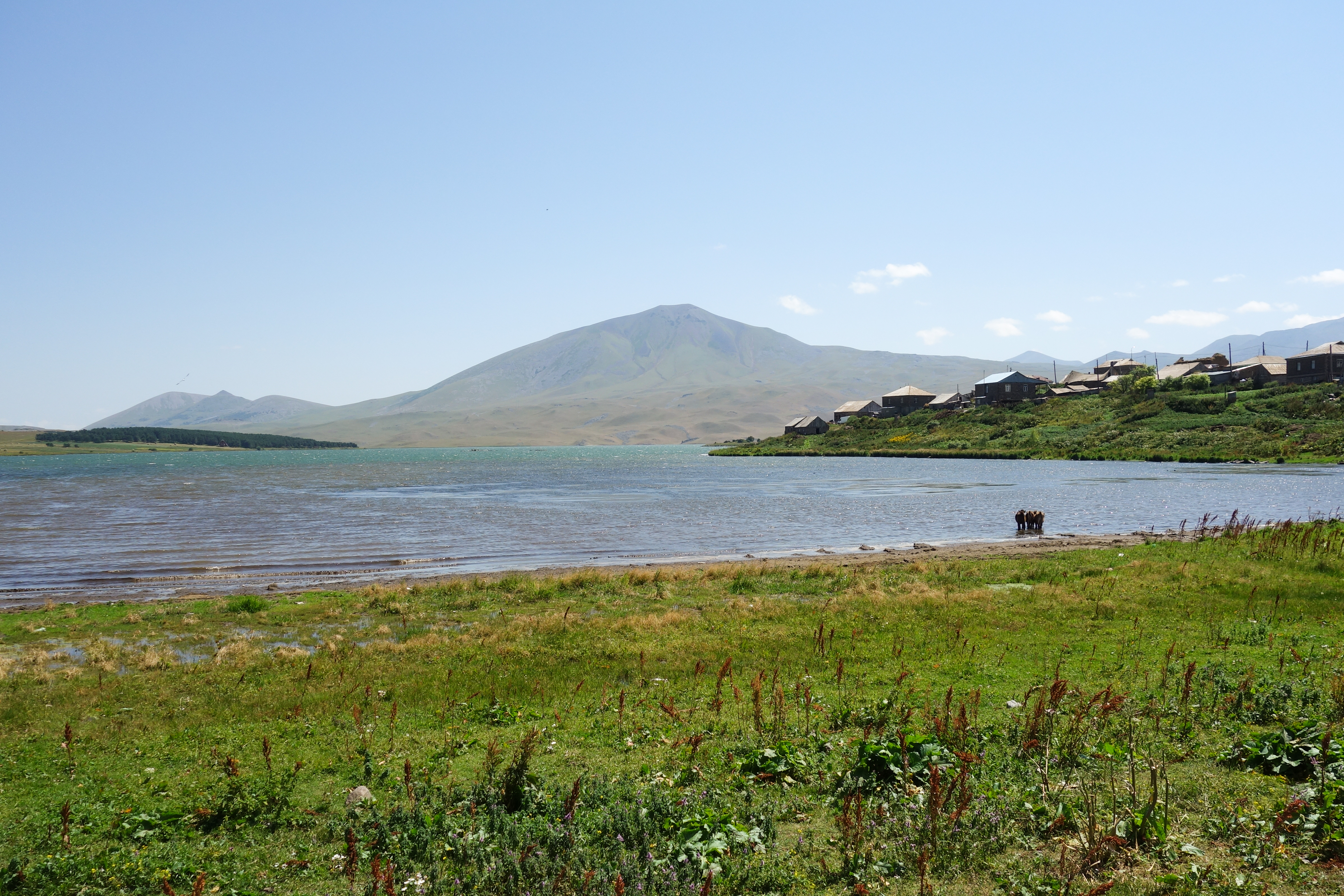
- Shavnabada seen from the village of Tabatskuri

Highest point
- Elevation: 2,929 m (9,610 ft)
- Coordinates: 41°37′05″N 43°42′33″E

Geography
- Location within Samtskhe-Javakheti Location within Georgia
- Location: Georgia
- Parent range: Abul-Samsari Range

Shavnabada (Georgian: შავნაბადა) is a mountain and extinct volcano of 2929 m/9507 ft height in southeastern Georgia. It is one of the highest mountains of the Abul-Samsari Range, a part of the Lesser Caucasus.
