= Skalisty Range, Caucasus =

Mountain range of the Caucasus in Russia

Skalisty Range Скалистый хребет
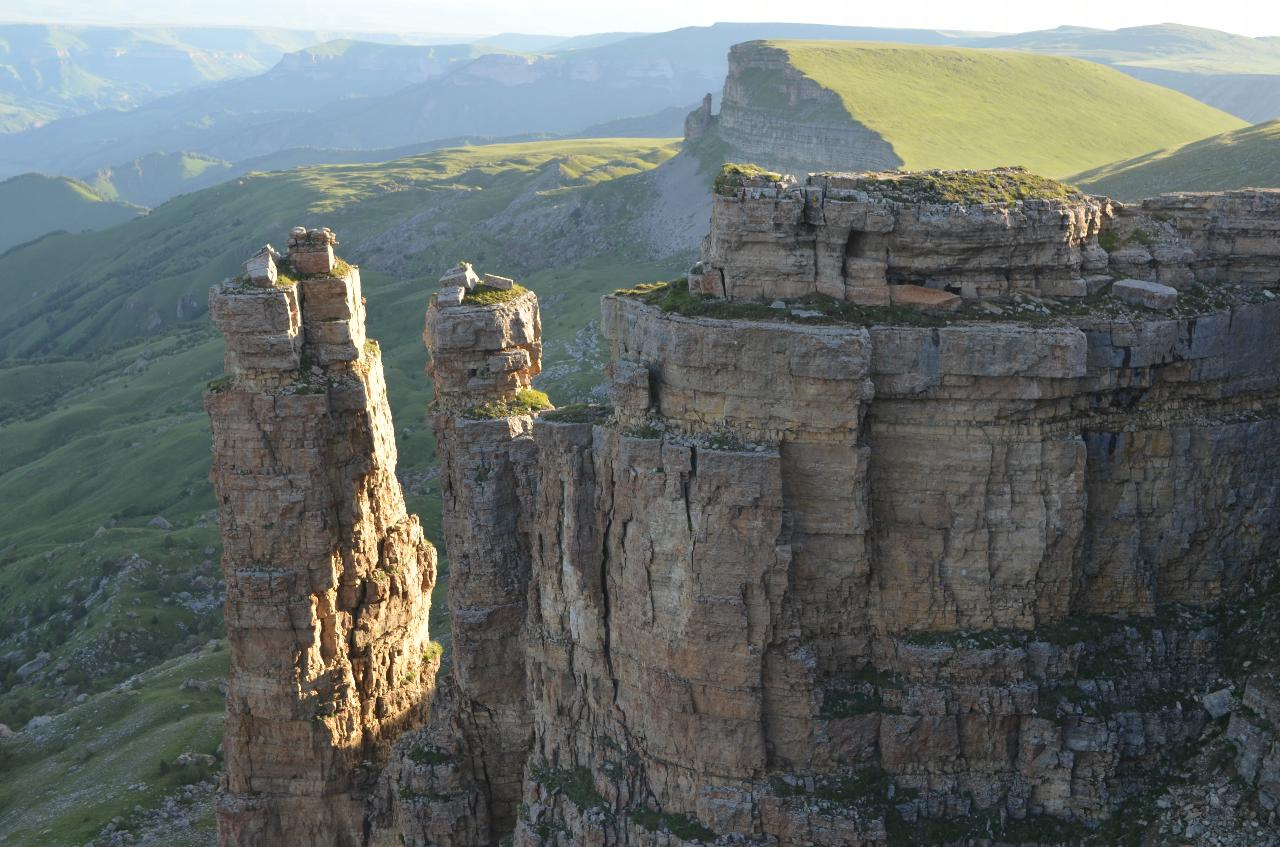
- Bolshoy Bermamyt

Highest point
- Peak: Karakaya
- Elevation: 3,646 m (11,962 ft)
- Coordinates: 43°16′06″N 43°14′42″E

Dimensions
- Length: 931 km (578 mi) ESE/WNW

Geography
- Location within Caucasus Mountains Location within European Russia
- Country: Russia
- Region: North Caucasus
- Range coordinates: 43°11′N 43°24′E
- Parent range: Greater Caucasus

Skalisty Range (Russian: Скалистый хребет) is a mountain range in the Greater Caucasus, Russian Federation.

== Geography ==
The Skalisty Range is a chain of ten separate mountain massifs stretching parallel to the northern side of the Lateral Range along the Krasnodar Territory, Karachay-Cherkessia, Kabardino-Balkaria and North Ossetia federal subjects. Its high mountain massifs are separated by the upper reaches of the rivers flowing on the northern slope of the Greater Caucasus. It extends from northwest to southeast for 931 km from the upper course of the Belaya River, a left tributary of the Kuban, to the west, reaching almost the Terek River in the east, in the area of Vladikavkaz town.

The average height of the Skalisty Range is between 1,200 meters (3,900 ft) and 1,700 meters (5,600 ft) in the west, reaching 3,000 meters (9,800 ft) in the east. The highest point is 3,646 meters (11,962 ft) high Karakaya, located between rivers Chegem and Cherek in the Republic of Kabardino-Balkaria. The ridge has steep, in places vertical, southern slopes, while the northern slopes are gentler, though broken by numerous narrow river valleys from the basins of the Kuban and Terek rivers. There are numerous karst formations.

== Flora ==
The northern slopes of Skalisty Range are largely covered with deciduous forests, while the southern slopes and the areas above the tree line include mountain steppe and pasture in the non-rocky areas.

== See also ==
- List of mountains and hills of Russia
- Erzi Nature Reserve
