= Deavgay =

Mountain in Russia

- De avgay, Kyelbid Ban
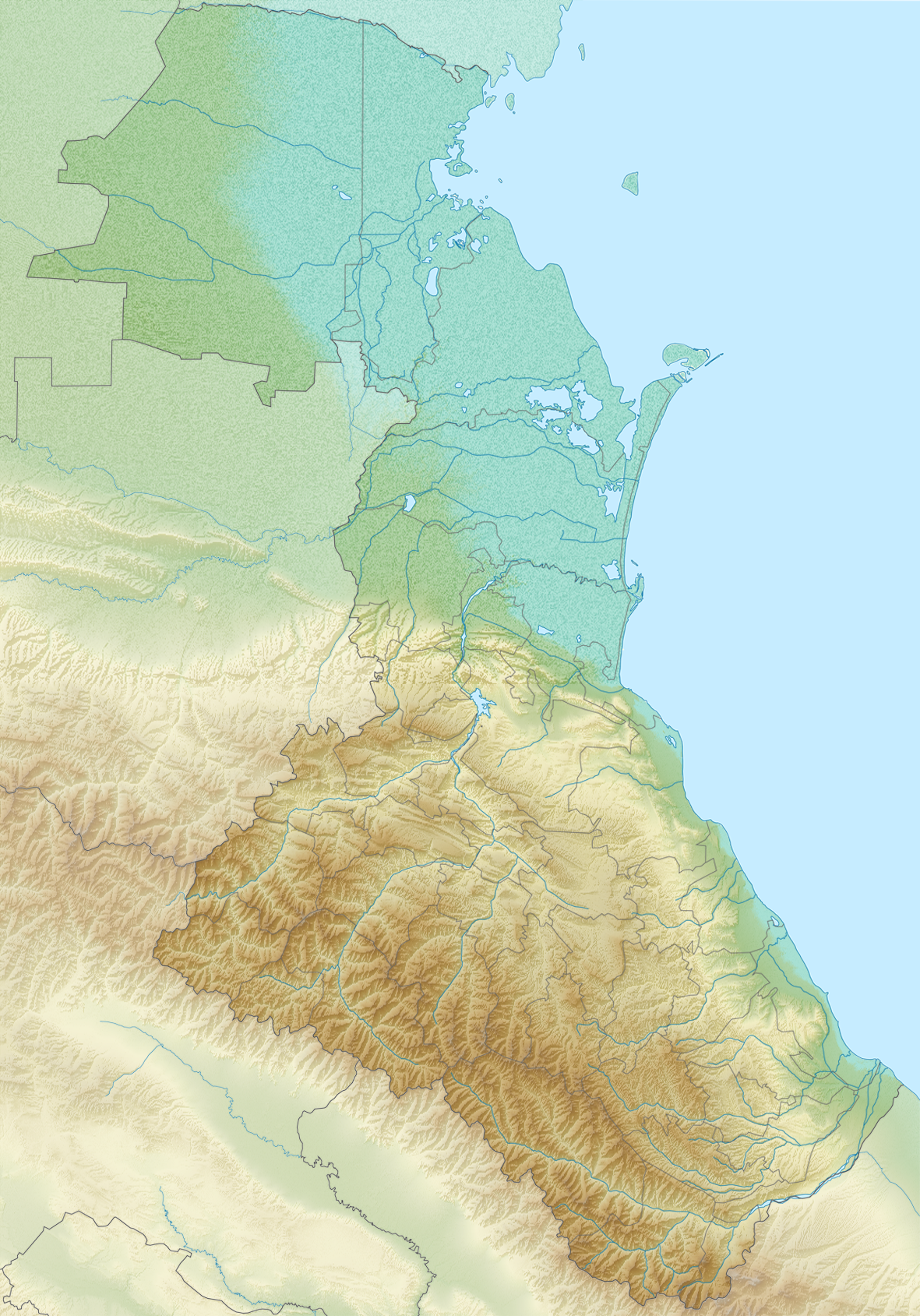
- Location within Caucasus Mountains Location within Republic of Dagestan

Highest point
- Elevation: 4,016 m (13,176 ft)
- Prominence: 1,251 m (4,104 ft)
- Listing: Ribu
- Coordinates: 41°29′48″N 47°19′34″E

Geography
- Location: Rutulsky District, Dagestan, Russia
- Country: Dagestan
- Parent range: Greater Caucasus

Deavgay (Rutul: De avgay, Rutul: Kyelbid Ban, Russian: Деавгай) is a mountain located in Dagestan, Russia. At 4,016 m (13,176 ft) elevation, it is the highest point of the Kyabyak range of the Greater Caucasus.

== Geography ==
3D panoramic view of Mount Deavgay

The mountain belongs to the Samur basin. It is in Rutulsky District, 5 km north of the village Borch and 9 km southwest of the larger village Rutul. Deavgay is Dagestan's eleventh-highest mountain and the 193rd-highest in Russia.
