= Mount Samsari =

Mountain in Georgia

Samsari
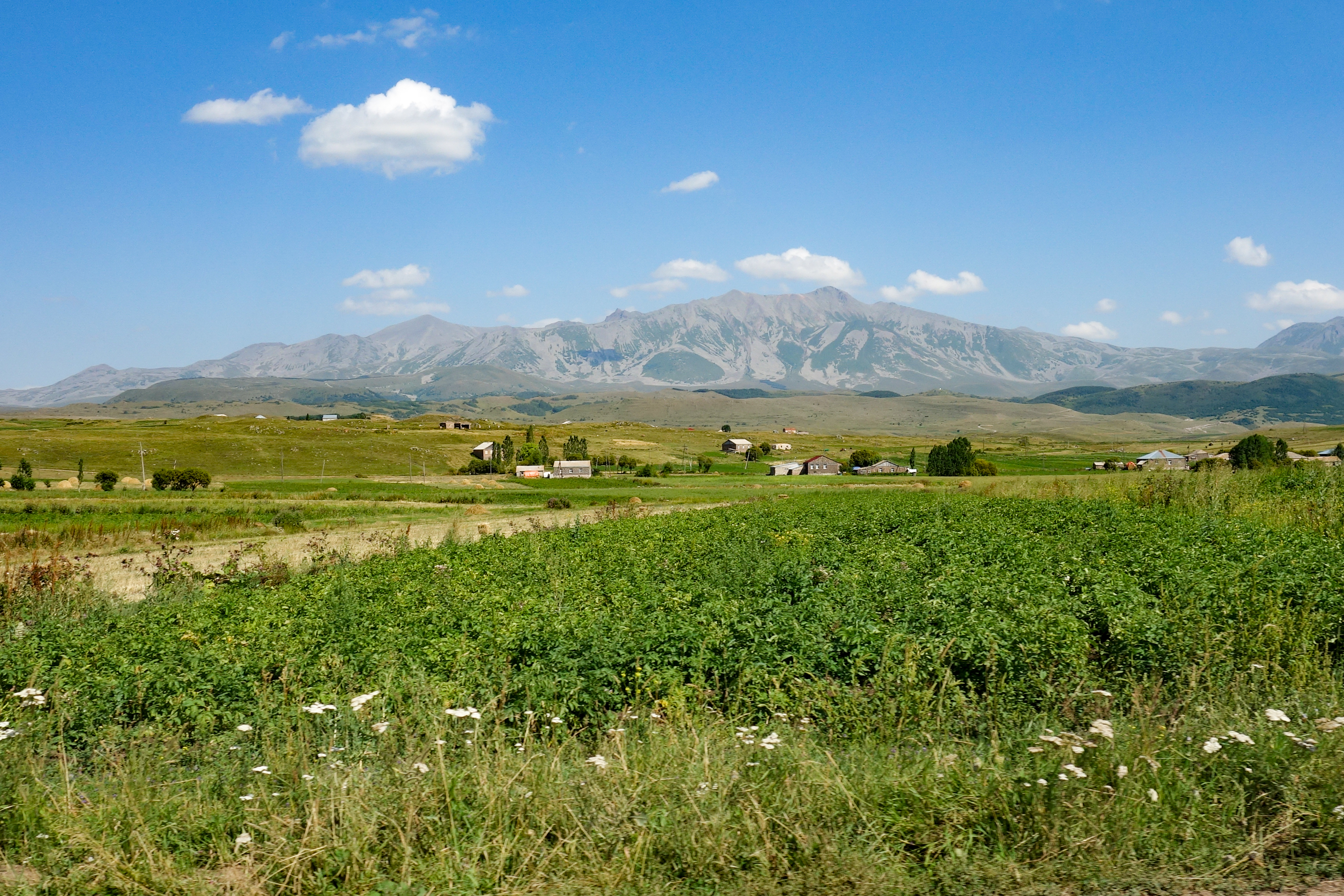
- Samsari as seen from west

Highest point
- Elevation: 3,285 m (10,778 ft)
- Coordinates: 41.5356°N 43.6708°E

Geography
- Location within Samtskhe-Javakheti Location within Georgia
- Location: Samtskhe–Javakheti, Kvemo Kartli, Georgia
- Parent range: Abul-Samsari

Mount Samsari (Georgian: სამსარი) is a peak of the Abul-Samsari Range in Southern Georgia. The elevation of the mountain is 3,285 metres (10,778 ft) above sea level. Mount Samsari represents a volcanic cone, inside of which lies a caldera with a diameter of 3 kilometres (1.9 mi) with a semicircular ridge surrounding it. The formation of the caldera is linked to local fault systems. The floor of the caldera is lined with rocks and glacial debris as well as small lakes and contains volcanokarst formations. The caldera rim contains traces of previous glaciation, including cirques. The mountain was built up during the late Quaternary period and is made up of andesites, dacites and rhyolites. The slopes of Samsari are mainly devoid of vegetation. The caldera formed roughly 200ka ago.
