= Karakaya (Skalisty Range) =

Mountain peak

- Каракая
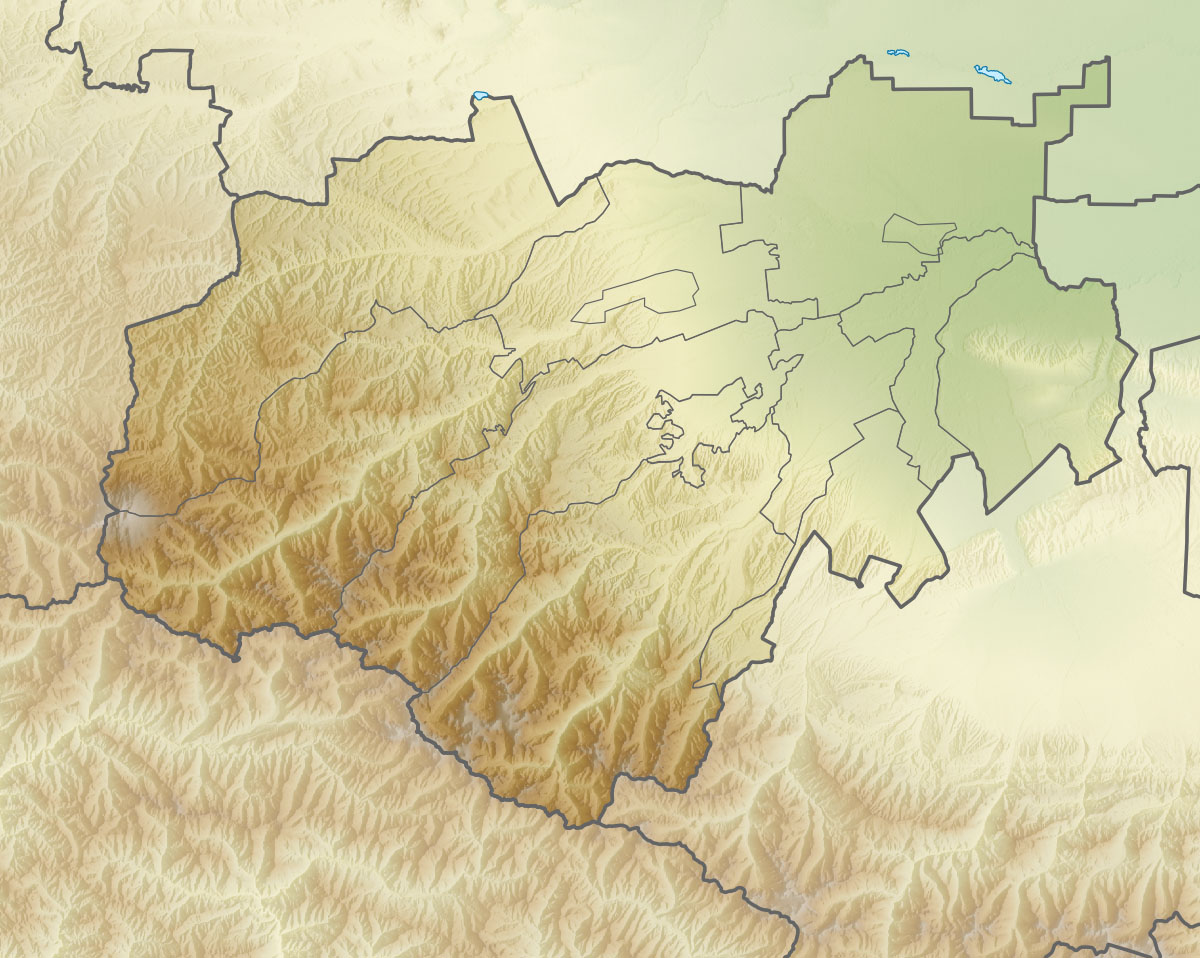
- Location within Kabardino-Balkaria

Highest point
- Elevation: 3,646 m (11,962 ft)
- Coordinates: 43°16′06″N 43°14′42″E

Geography
- Location: Kabardino-Balkaria, Russia
- Parent range: Skalisty Range, Caucasus

Karakaya (Russian: Каракая) is the highest peak in the Skalisty Range, North Caucasus.

It is located in the Kabardino-Balkaria federal subject of Russia, between the Chegem and Cherek rivers.

== See also ==
- List of mountains and hills of Russia
