= Greater Caucasus =

Major mountain range of the Caucasus Mountains

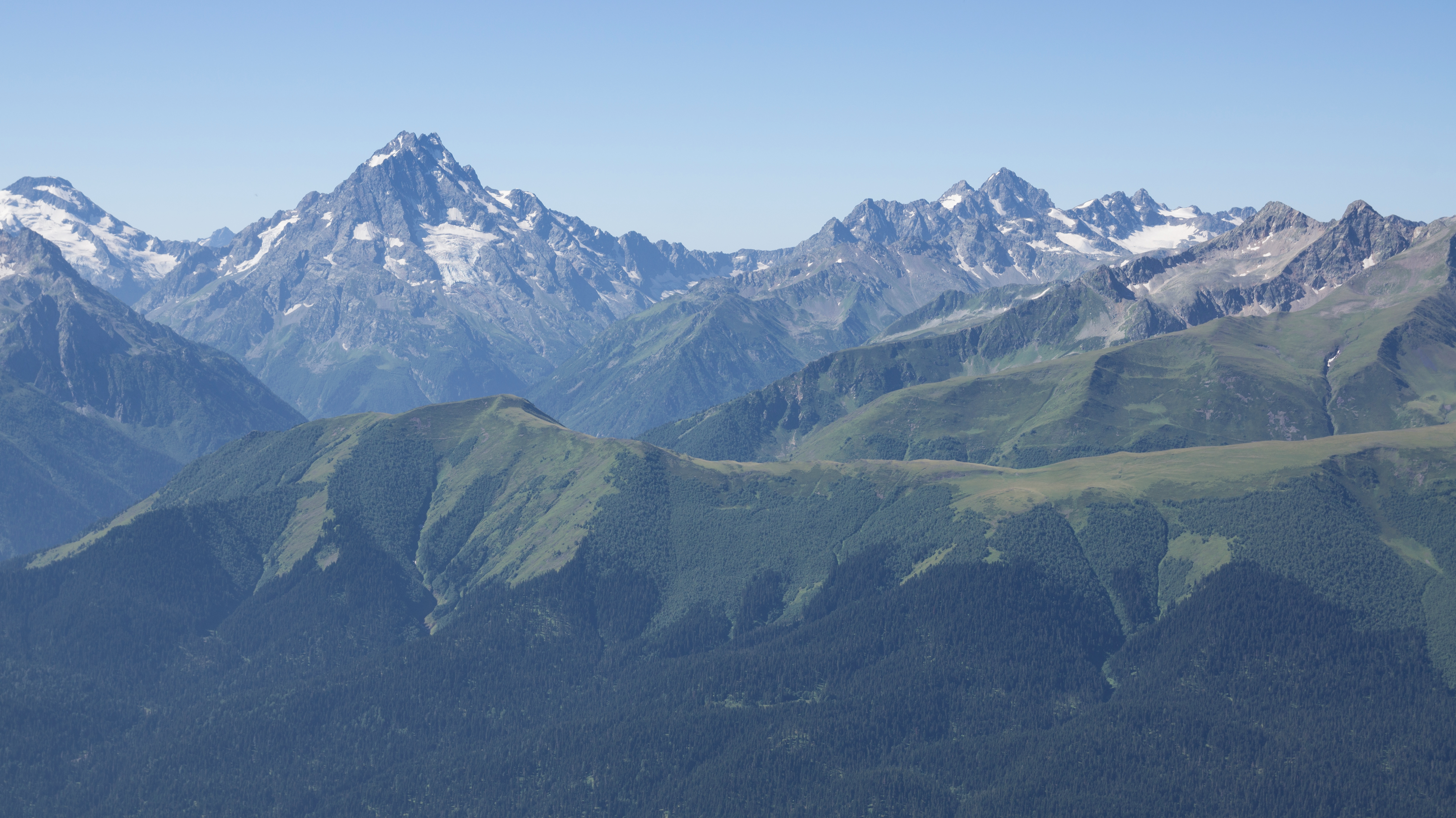
- Greater Caucasus Range near Arkhyz

Highest point
- Peak: Mount Elbrus
- Elevation: 5,642 m (18,510 ft)
- Coordinates: 43°21′18″N 42°26′31″E

Dimensions
- Length: 1,200 km (750 mi) NW-SE

Geography
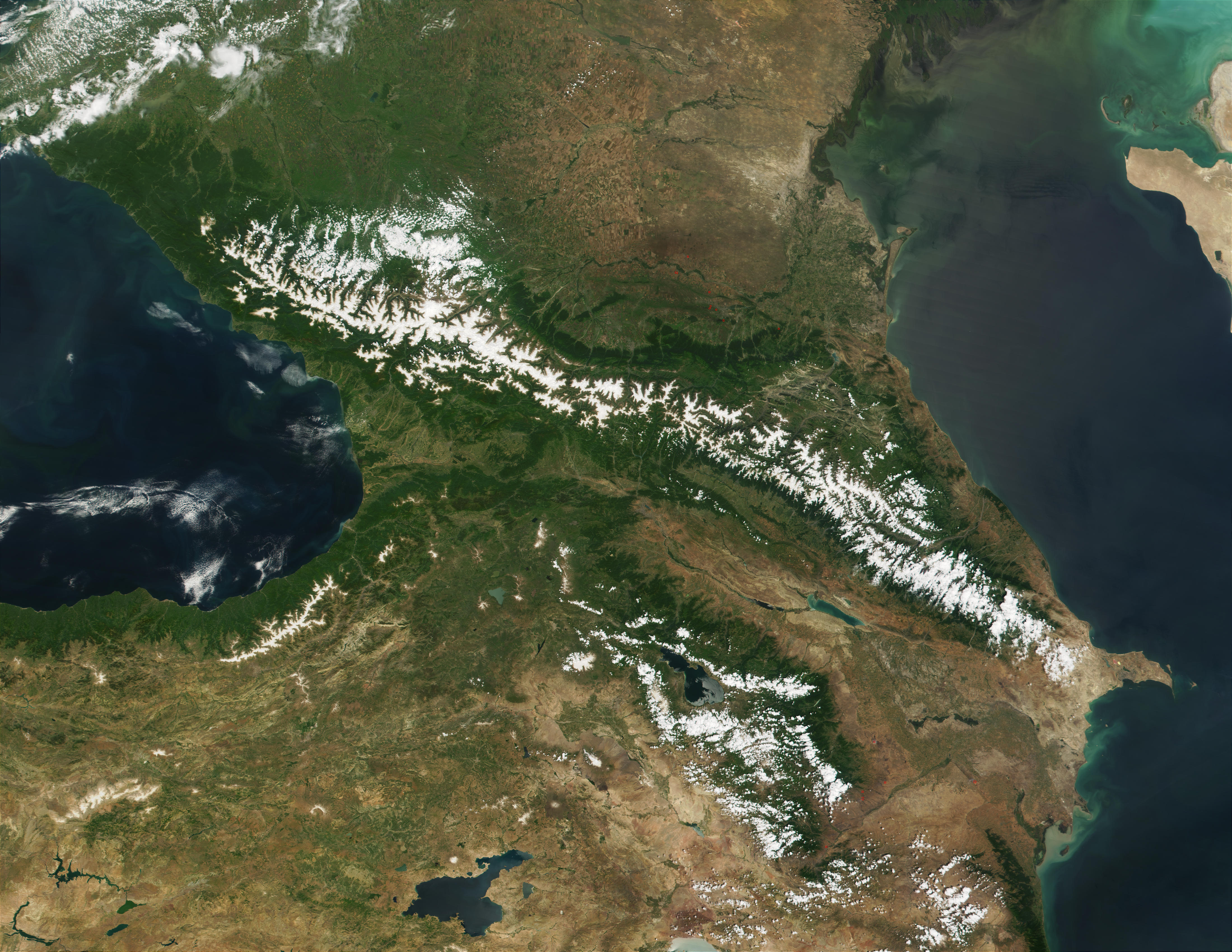
- Satellite image. The long snowy range across the centre is the Greater Caucasus.
- Countries: Azerbaijan; Georgia; Russia
- Region: Caucasus
- Parent range: Caucasus Mountains
- Borders on: Lesser Caucasus

The Greater Caucasus (Note: Azerbaijani: Böyük Qafqaz; Georgian: დიდი კავკასიონი, Didi K’avk’asioni; Russian: Большой Кавказ, romanized: Bolshoy Kavkaz) (Note: Also translated as "Caucasus Major".) is the major mountain range of the Caucasus Mountains. It stretches for about 1,200 kilometres (750 mi) from west-northwest to east-southeast, from the Taman Peninsula of the Black Sea to the Absheron Peninsula of the Caspian Sea: from the Western Caucasus in the vicinity of Sochi on the northeastern shore of the Black Sea and reaching nearly to Baku on the Caspian.

== Geography ==
The range is traditionally separated into three parts:

- The Western Caucasus between the Black Sea and Mount Elbrus
- The Central Caucasus between Mount Elbrus and Mount Kazbek
- The Eastern Caucasus between Mount Kazbek and the Caspian Sea

In the wetter Western Caucasus, the mountains are heavily forested (deciduous forest up to 1,500 metres (4,900 ft), coniferous forest up to 2,500 metres (8,200 ft) and alpine meadows above the tree line). In the drier Eastern Caucasus, the mountains are mostly treeless.

== Europe–Asia boundary ==
The watershed of the Caucasus is also considered by some to be the boundary between Eastern Europe and Western Asia. The European part to the north of the watershed is known as Ciscaucasia; the Asiatic part to the south as Transcaucasia, which is dominated by the Lesser Caucasus mountain range whose western portion converges with Eastern Anatolia.

Most of the border of Russia with Georgia and Azerbaijan runs along most of the Caucasus' length. The Georgian Military Road (Darial Gorge) and Trans-Caucasus Highway traverse this mountain range at altitudes of up to 3,000 metres (9,800 ft).

== Watershed ==
The watershed of the Caucasus was the border between the Caucasia province of the Russian Empire in the north and the Ottoman Empire and Persia in the south (1801) until the Russian victory in 1813 and the Treaty of Gulistan which moved the border of the Russian Empire well within Transcaucasia. The border between Georgia and Russia still follows the watershed almost exactly (except for Georgia's western border, which extends south of the watershed, and a narrow strip of territory in northwestern Kakheti and northern Mtskheta-Mtianeti where Georgia extends north of the watershed), while Azerbaijan is south of the watershed except that its northeastern corner has six districts north of the watershed (Khachmaz, Quba, Qusar, Shabran, Siazan and Khizi).

== Peaks ==
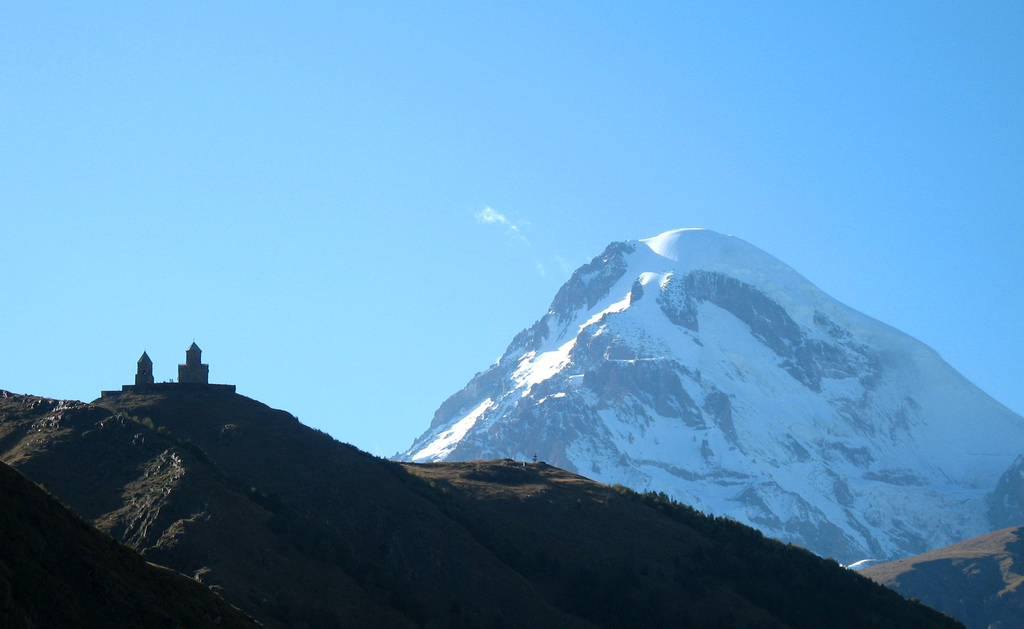
14th-century Georgian Orthodox Gergeti Trinity Church building, with Mount Kazbek in the background

- Mount Elbrus, 5,642 m (18,510 ft), 43°21′18″N 42°26′21″E is the highest mountain in Europe.
- Dykh-Tau, 5,205 m (17,077 ft), 43°3′N 43°8′E
- Shkhara, 5,201 m (17,064 ft), 43.01°N 43.17°E
- Koshtan-Tau, 5,151 m (16,900 ft), 43.05°N 43.2167°E
- Shota Rustaveli Peak, 4,859 m (15,942 ft), 43.02592°N 43.04349°E
- Kazbek (Mkinvartsveri), 5,047 m (16,558 ft), 42°41′51″N 44°31′08″E
- Tebulosmta, 4,493 m (14,741 ft), 42.64°N 45.32°E
- Diklosmta, 4,285 m (14,058 ft), 42.55°N 45.80°E
- Bazardüzü, 4,466 m (14,652 ft), 41.27°N 47.79°E
- Babadag, 3,629 m (11,906 ft), 41.05°N 48.29°E
- Katyn-Tau, 4,979 m (16,335 ft), 43.03069°N 43.03555°E
- Pik Pushkina, 5,033 m (16,512 ft), 43.01422°N 43.07001°E
- Janga, 5,051 m (16,572 ft), 43.01889°N 43.05671°E
- Tetnuldi, 4,858 m (15,938 ft), 43.03113°N 42.99319°E
- Ushba, 4,710 m (15,450 ft), 43.12486°N 42.65901°E
- Ailama, 4,525 m (14,846 ft), 42°57′29″N 43°10′43″E
- Mount Karakaya, 3,646 m (11,962 ft), 43°01′04″N 43°14′44″E, highest of the Skalisty Range, Caucasus

== Passes ==
- Bogovatchosgele Pass 2,968 m (9,738 ft), 42.59°N 44.89°E
- Abano Pass 2,864 m (9,396 ft), 42.27°N 45.52°E
- Mamison Pass 2,836 m (9,304 ft), 42.72°N 43.80°E
- Datvisjvari Pass 2,689 m (8,822 ft), 42.52°N 45.06°E
- Marukhi Pass 2,748 m (9,016 ft),43.38°N 41.37°E)
- Pereval Klukhorskiy 2,786 m (9,140 ft), 43.26°N 41.80°E
- Jvari Pass 2,379 m (7,805 ft), 42.50°N 44.45°E
- Dübrar Pass 2,209 m (7,247 ft), 40.96°N 48.63°E
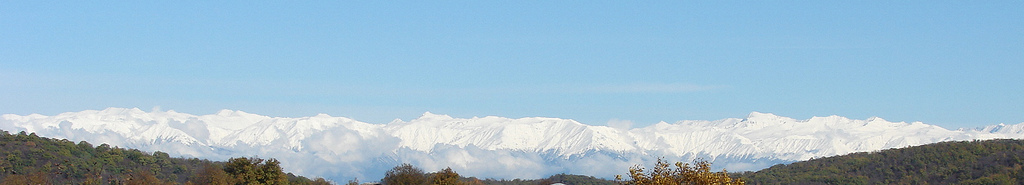
The snow-capped peaks of the Greater Caucasus

== See also ==
- Lesser Caucasus
- Skalisty Range, Caucasus
- Tumsoy-Lam (mountain)
