= Didi Abuli =

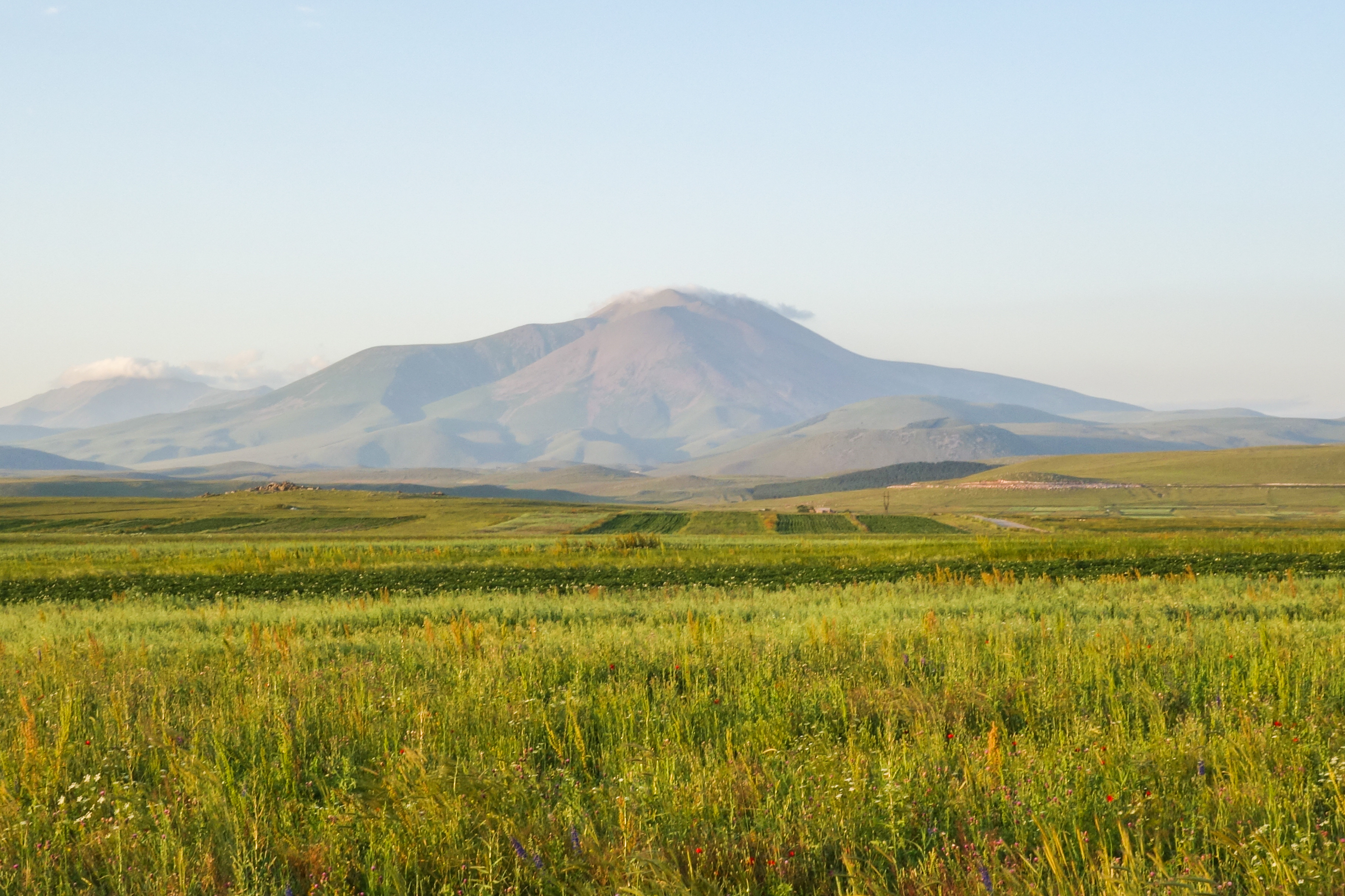
- The view of Didi Abuli from south-west

Highest point
- Elevation: 3,301 m (10,830 ft)
- Prominence: 1,314 m (4,311 ft)
- Isolation: 108.23 km (67.25 mi)
- Listing: Ribu
- Coordinates: 41°26′17″N 43°38′45″E

Naming
- Native name: დიდი აბული (Georgian)

Geography
- Location within Georgia Location within Samtskhe-Javakheti
- Location: Georgia
- Parent range: Abul-Samsari Range

Didi Abuli (Georgian: დიდი აბული; Armenian: Աբուլ (Abul)) is one of the highest peaks of the Lesser Caucasus Mountains in the nation of Georgia. The mountain is located in the Abul-Samsari Range at an elevation of 3,301 m (10,830 ft) above sea level. Didi Abuli is an extinct stratovolcano.
