= Kabardino-Balkaria Nature Reserve =

Strict nature reserve in Kabardino-Balkaria, Russia

Kabardino-Balkarski Nature Reserve
- Russian: Кабардино-Балкарский заповедник (Also: Kabardino-Balkarsky)
- IUCN category Ia (strict nature reserve)
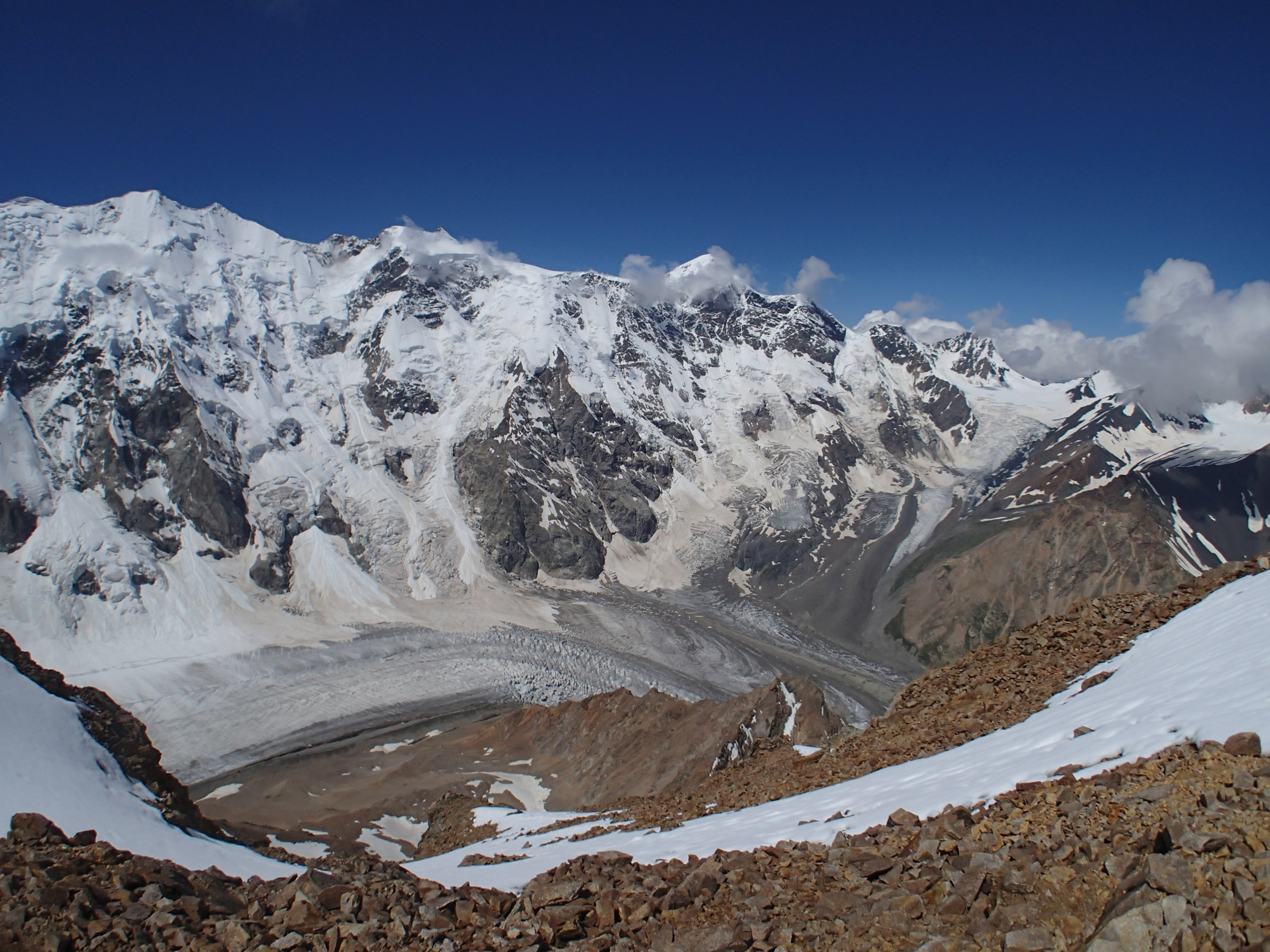
- Kabardino-Balkarski Zapovednik

- Location within Russia
- Location: Kabardino-Balkar Republic
- Nearest city: Kashkhatau
- Coordinates: 43°2′56″N 43°14′33″E
- Area: 82,507 hectares (203,879 acres; 319 sq mi)
- Established: 1976
- Governing body: Ministry of Natural Resources and Environment (Russia)
- Website: http://zapovednik-kbr.ru/

Kabardino-Balkarski Nature Reserve (Russian: Кабардино-Балкарский заповедник Kabardina-Balkarskiy zapavyednik) (also Kabardino-Balkarsky) is a Russian 'zapovednik' (strict ecological reserve) on main ridge of the north Caucasus Mountains. It contains all of the mountains in Europe over 5,000 meters besides Mt. Elbrus and Mt. Kazbek, and contains the most glaciers. The ridge at the reserve forms the famous "Bezengi wall" consisting of the peaks Gestola (4859 m), Katyn-Tau (4858.8 m), Janga (5051 m), Eastern Jangi-Tau (5033 m) and Shkhara (5068 m). There are 256 glaciers in the reserve's boundaries. The reserve is situated in the Chereksky District of Kabardino-Balkar Republic; it was created in 1976, and covers an area of 82,507 ha (318.56 sq mi).

== Topography ==
The reserve covers mountains ranging from 1,800 meters in the river valleys to the highest point on Mt. Dykh-tau (5,204 meters). 60% of the reserve is alpine zone above the tree line. The territory consists of three ridges separated by deep valleys of Chegem River, the Cherek-Bezengi River, and Cherek-Balkaria River. The westernmost ridge is called Kargashilsky ridge.

== Climate and Ecoregion ==
Kabardino-Balkarski is located in the Caucasus mixed forests ecoregion. This ecoregion is located along the Caucasus Mountains between the Black Sea and the Caspian Sea. It has one of the highest levels of species endemism and diversity in the world: 23% of vascular species, and 10% of vertebrates.

The climate of Kabardino-Balkarski is Humid continental climate, cool summer (Köppen climate classification (Dfb)). This climate is characterized by large swings in temperature, both diurnally and seasonally, with mild summers and cold, snowy winters. The climatic effects in the reserve are highly affected by altitude: at 2,000 meters, the minimum temperature in January can reach -30 C degrees, while at 4,000 meters the minimum temperature might reach -50 C degrees.

== Flora and fauna ==
The biodiversity of the plants is due to the wide range of altitude zones and the complexity of the terrain. In the nival zone, above 3,600 meters, there is no vegetation at all. In the sub-nival zone from 3,000 to 3,500 the sparse and non-continuous vegetation is that of tundra: lichens, creeping willow, saxifrage. From 2,300 meters to 3,000 meters is low-grass alpine meadows (up to 30 cm in height). The sub-alpine zone, 1,400 to 2,600 meters, is alpine meadows of hazel, alder, and rhododendron. From 1,000 to 2,400 meters is a forest belt of broad leaf trees to 1,600 meters and conifers above. Below 1,000 meters is pine, birch and oak forest.

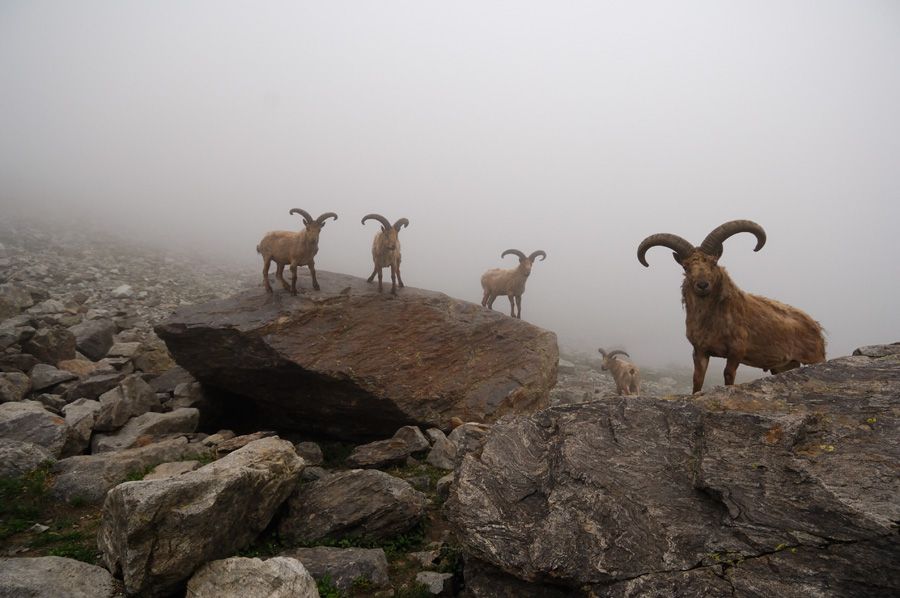
Kabardino-Balkarsky

The representative mammal is the endangered West Caucasian tur. It is found in two separate sub-species in the Chegem and Bezengi gorges, representing the Western Caucasus and Dagestan. Brown bears are very common. Other common animals are fox, jackal, wild cat, martens, ermine, weasels, Altai squirrel, hare, and several species of rodents, shrews, and bats. The only fish found in the streams are brook trout.

== Ecotourism ==
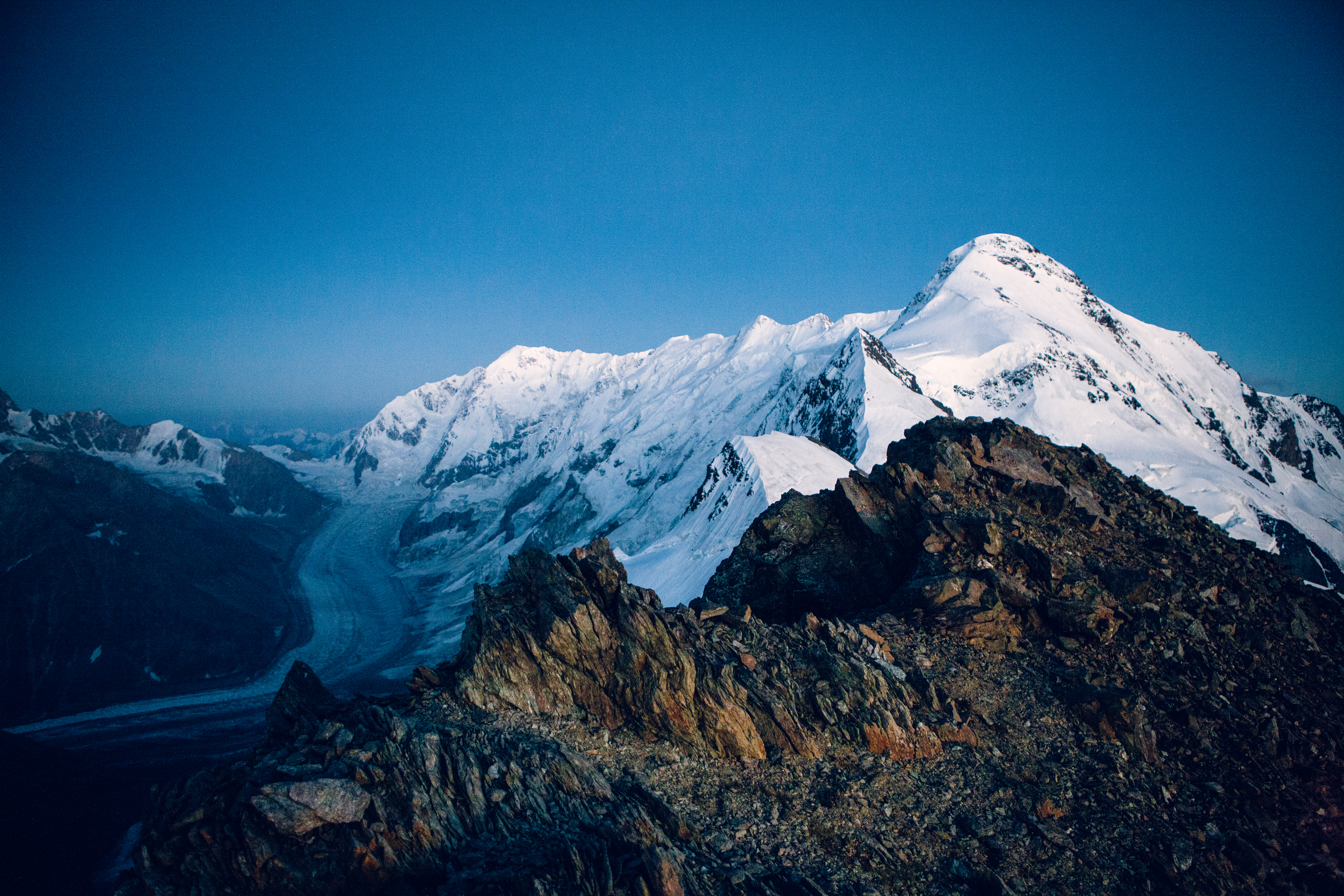
The Bezengi Wall seen from the Georgian side of the border.

As a strict nature reserve, the Kabardino-Balkaria Reserve is mostly closed to the general public, although scientists and those with 'environmental education' purposes can make arrangements with park management for visits. There are several 'ecotourist' routes in the reserve, however, that are open to the public, but require permits to be obtained in advance. Three popular tourist routes are:

- To the Bezengi Glacier. A high mountain path to the Bezengi Glacier (at 18 km long one of the longest glaciers in the Caucasus), with information placards along the way and an observation tower, past the Xu Chukhur waterfall and alpine shrub land.
- Mijirghi. Three kilometer mountain path to a lake at the foot of the Miirghi Glacier.
- Narzan Source. Hike through mountain forest to the source; see the flora and fauna of the Chegem forest and sample the natural mineral waters.

The main office is in the city of Kashkhatau.

== See also ==
- List of Russian Nature Reserves (class 1a 'zapovedniks')
- National Parks of Russia
- Lateral Range & Main Caucasian Range
