= Bezengi Glacier =

Glacier in Russia

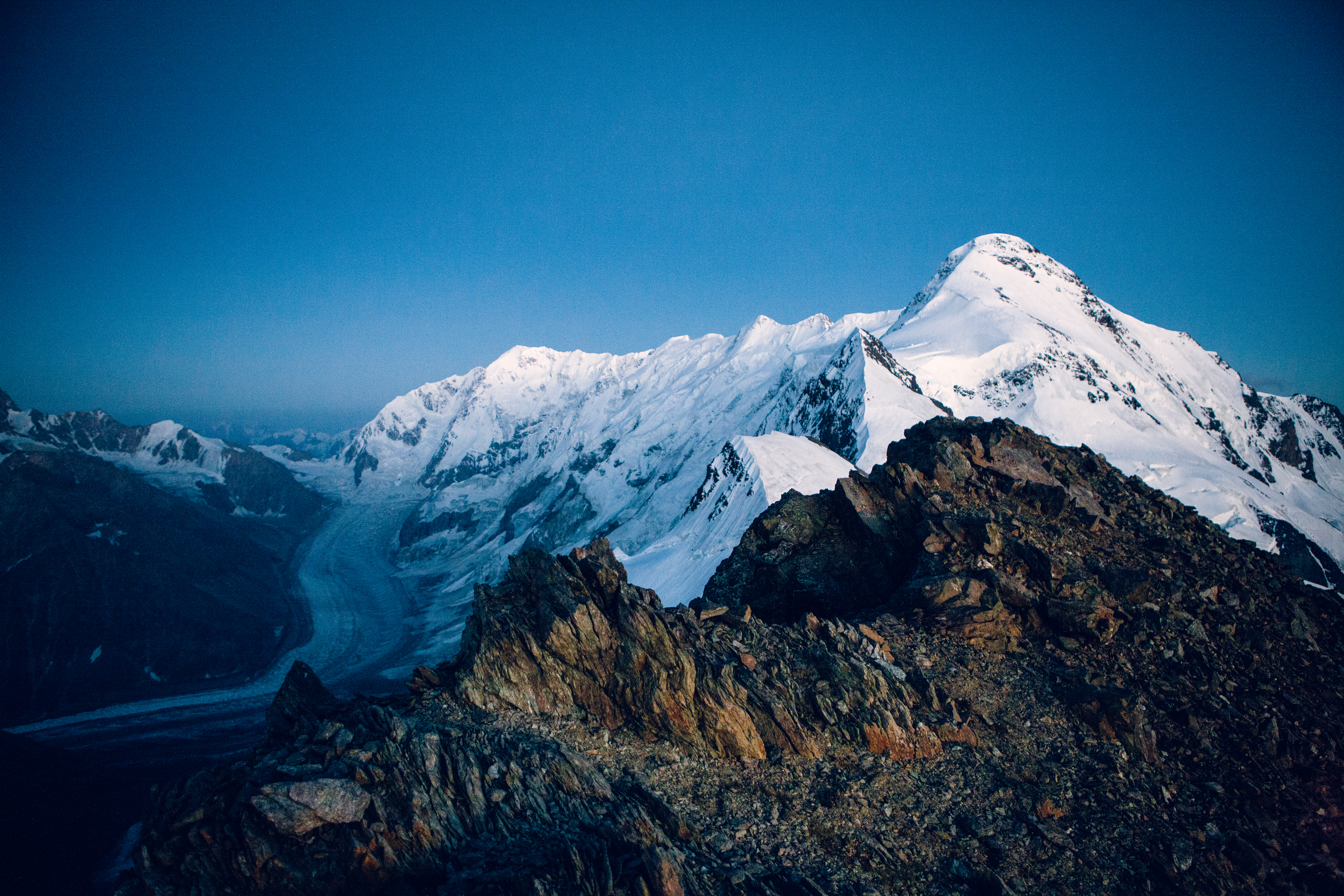
- Bezengi Wall and Bezengi Glacier

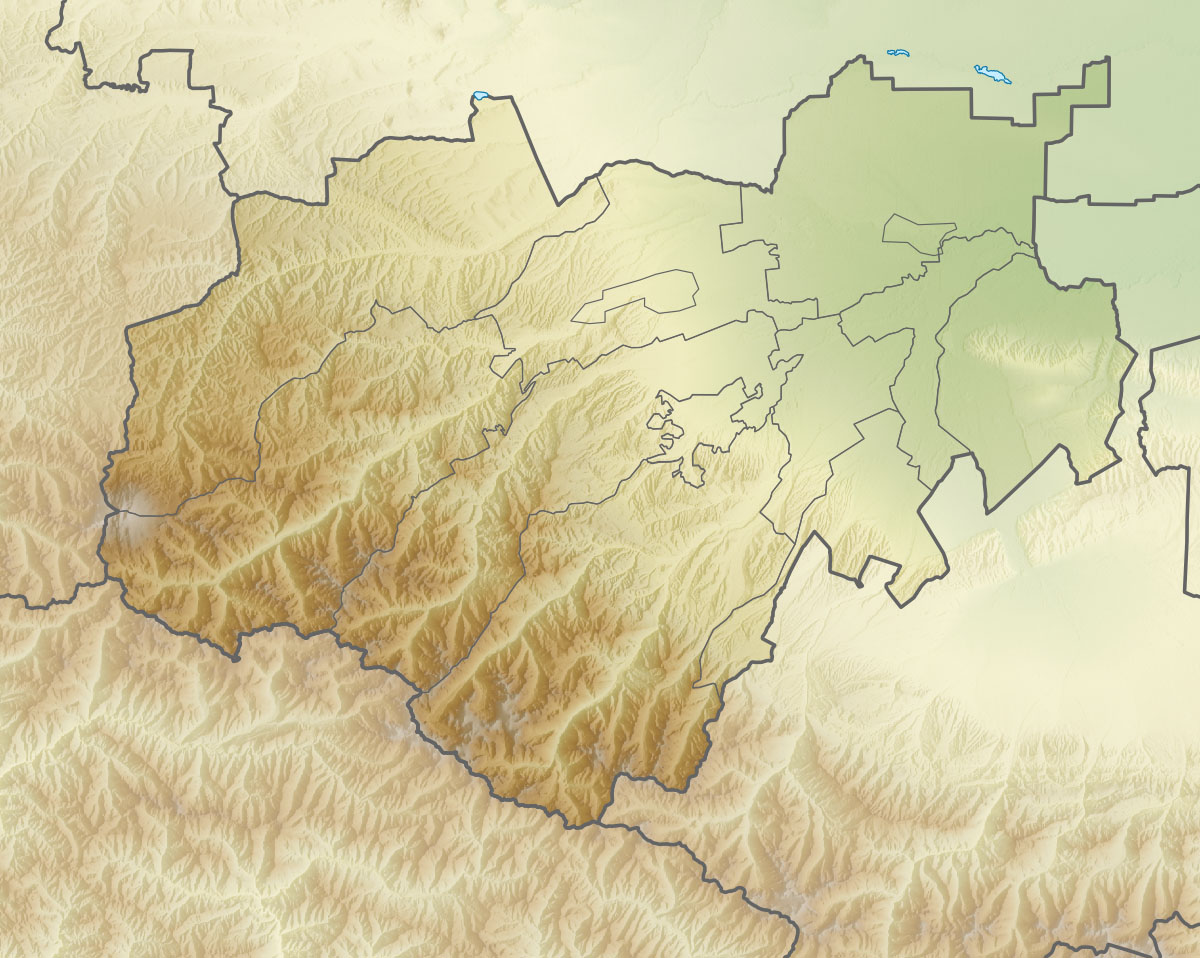
- Location within Caucasus Mountains Location within Kabardino-Balkaria Location within European Russia
- Interactive map of Bezengi Glacier
- Type: Valley
- Location: Kabardino-Balkaria, Russia
- Coordinates: 43.0569°N 43.0969°E
- Area: 36 km^{2} (14 sq mi)
- Length: 17.6 km (10.9 mi)
- Terminus: 9 km moraine
- Status: Growing

The Bezengi Glacier (Karachay-Balkar: Уллу чыран, romanized: Ullu çıran, lit. 'big glacier') is a vast valley-type glacier in the Republic of Kabardino-Balkaria, Russia, near the northern slope of the Main Caucasian Range of the Caucasus.

== Morphology ==
The Bezengi Glacier runs from the peaks of Shkhara and Janga until it drops to height 2000 m. Glacier area 36 km, length 17.6 km, tongue about 9 km. Much of the tongue of the mare is covered with moraines and fragments. The Bezengi Glacier is a source of the river Cherek.

== See also ==
- List of glaciers in Russia
- Bezengi Wall
