= Bezengi Wall =

Section of the Greater Caucasus mountains

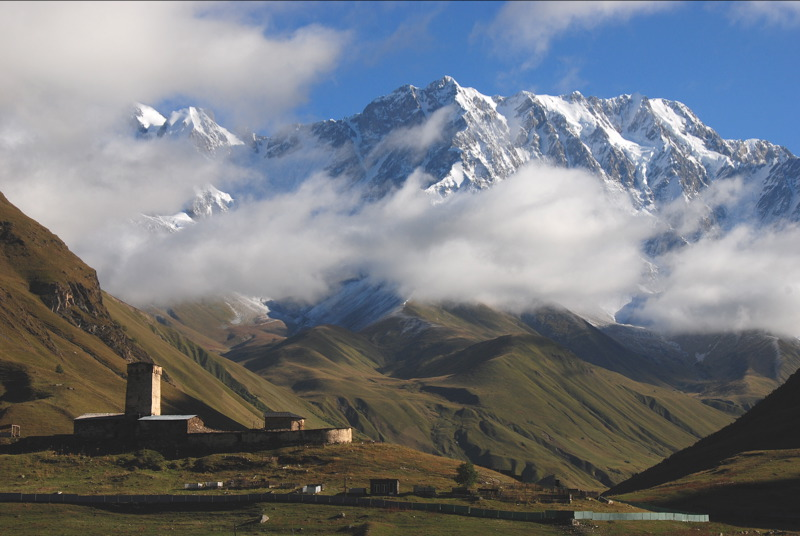
- Mount Shkhara

Highest point
- Peak: Shkhara
- Elevation: 5,203 m (17,070 ft)
- Coordinates: 43°00′02″N 43°06′44″E

Dimensions
- Length: 11–12 km (6.8–7.5 mi)

Naming
- Native name: Бызынгы Таула Тизгини (Karachay-Balkar); ბეზენგის კედელი (Georgian); Безенгийская стена (Russian)

Geography
- Location within Georgia Location within Russia
- Countries: Georgia and Russia
- Range coordinates: 43°01′23″N 43°02′52″E
- Parent range: Caucasus Mountains
- Borders on: Greater Caucasus

Bezengi Wall (Karachay-Balkar: Бызынгы Таула Тизгини, romanized: Bızıñı Tawla Tizgini; Georgian: ბეზენგის კედელი; Russian: Безенгийская стена, also known as the Khalde Wall) or Pitsrula is a 11-to-12 km (6.8-to-7.5 mi) long mountain range of the Greater Caucasus, in the Svaneti region of Georgia and Kabardino-Balkaria region of Russia.

Highest section of the Central Caucasus. The highest point of the Bezengi Wall is 5,203-metre (17,070 ft) high mount Shkhara, the highest peak of Georgia. Notable peaks include Janga (5,085 m [16,683 ft]), Katyn-Tau (4,979 m [16,335 ft]), Shota Rustaveli Peak (4,960 m [16,270 ft]), Gistola (4,860 m [15,940 ft]), Lalveri (4,350 m [14,270 ft]) and Esenin Peak (4,310 m [14,140 ft]). Bezengi Wall surrounded by ice cliffs on either side.

The geologic makeup of the mountains consists of grey granitoids. Bezengi Glacier lies on the northern slopes of the range and the Khalde Glacier and Shkhara Glacier located on the southern slopes. Avalanches occur each year.

== Geography ==
The Bezengi group is a group of some of the highest mountains of the Caucasus in the central Caucasus mountains. Of the 14 mountains in the Caucasus higher than 5,000 metres (16,000 ft), 11 are located here. They form two large steep walls on the Russian side of the border, the Dychtau-Koshtantau ridge (Entirely in Russia) and the Bezengi wall on the border between Georgia and Russia, however the Bezengi wall is on the Russian side.

== Climbing history ==
On August 23, 1931, three Austrians, Karl Poppinger, Karl Moldan and Sepp Schintlmeister, set out to traverse the top of the ridge from Shkhara to Lalveri, a journey which was around 13 km (8.1 mi). It was 17 km (11 mi) in total including the start and end locations before and after the ridges. Although many people had climbed most of the mountains along the ridge, they were the first to cover all of it and the first to cover large stretches of it. They finished their journey at the Zanner Pass.
