= Henry William Holder =

English mountaineer and author (1855–1895)

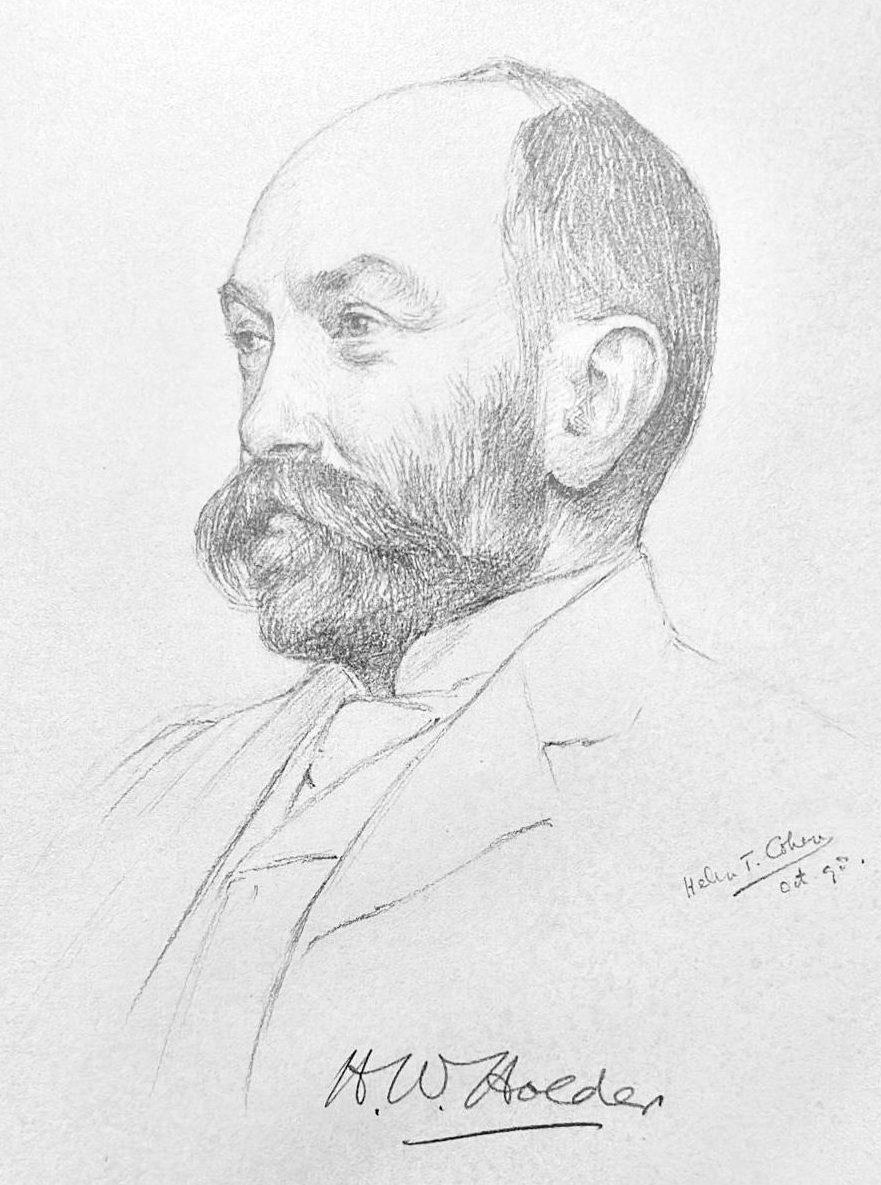
- Born: 26 February 1851; Sheet, Hampshire, England
- Died: February 17, 1938 (aged 86); Westmorland, England
- Occupations: Mountaineer, Registrar
- Spouse: Ethel Winfred Smith

Henry William Holder (26 February 1851, Sheet, Hampshire, England – 1938), was an English mountaineer. He is notable for making the first ascents of Katyn-Tau and Saluinan Bashi in 1888, Adai Khokh, Burdjula, and Zikhvarga in 1890, and Adyrsu-Bashi, Sarumbashi, and Gumatchi in 1896. He climbed alongside Albert F. Mummery, Hermann Woolley, and John Garforth Cockin.

== Life ==
Holder was the son of Henry Holder and Ellen Childs. He was born in Sheet, Hampshire in 1851 before moving to Yorkshire to attend his uncle's school. There, he won a scholarship to St John's College, Cambridge in 1875, where he graduated BA then MA in Moral Sciences in 1882. From Cambridge, he moved to Manchester, to Owens College, where he obtained a BA degree in theology. For the following three years he worked as a Congregational minister in Stalybridge before returning to Owens College to work as Registrar of the University.

Holder married Ethel Winifred Smith in 1899, the eldest daughter of George Henry Fisher Smith. They had one daughter, Mary Eileen Holder.

== Mountaineer ==
Holder made three important expeditions to the Caucasus mountains in 1888, 1890, and 1896. During all three expeditions he achieved the first ascents of several Caucasian peaks.

The first expedition in 1888 was organised by Holder after discovering a young Armenian student at Owens College, Manchester, who claimed to speak Russian, Turkish, and several Georgian dialects and offered to serve as interpreter. Holder's team was led by John Garford Cockin, and included Hermann Woolley, along with two Swiss guides, Ulrich Almer and Christian Roth. They summited Dykh-Tau (5,205m), the second-highest peak in the Caucasus, but a porter who had worked for Mummery and Zurfluh told them that the mountain had been climbed by the pair just a few weeks earlier (Mummery and Zurfluh had made the first ascent on July 24). The news caused great disappointment.

Holder and the team proceeded to summit Katyn-Tau (4,979m) on August 24 via the famously difficult Bezingi Face, and Saluinan Bashi (4,348m) on September 3. This was one of many ascents of the Caucasus in 1888, a year regarded by Holder as the 'annus mirabilis' for Caucasian alpinism. After their ascent of Saluinan Bashi, Woolley and Holder subsequently returned to England.

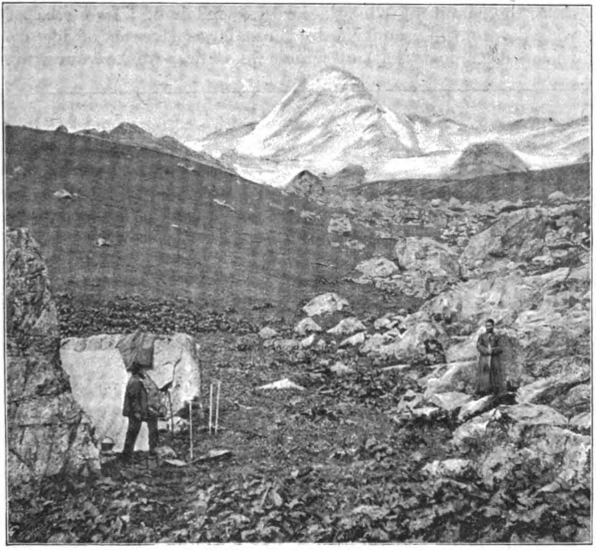
Camp at Mootsansara with Burdjula in background; H.W. Holder in foreground.

In 1890, Holder revisited the Caucasus for a second major expedition, this time focusing on the Adai Khokh group. The team included Cockin, Holder, W. J. Petherick, and Mummery. They began their ascent by first summiting Mootsansara, from which they were able to make the first ascent of Zikhvarga ('Tsforga'). Afterwards, they made the first ascents of Adai Khokh, Burdjula. Following these climbs, Holder's group attempted to summit Janga but this proved impossible due to the lateness of their initial ascent. On deciding whether to stay the night on the peak, at 17,000 ft, Holder noted to himself: "Remember...mountaineering is only recreation; it is not the main business of life.'

Holder undertook a final expedition in 1896 to Adyrsu Valley. Holder, Cockin, and Wooley achieved the first ascent of Adyrsu-Bashi (4370m) on the 21st August. On the descent, Holder and Woolley were almost crushed by falling stones. The team then completed the first ascent of Gumatchi (3810m) by its west ridge on the 28th of August, and a separate ascent of a peak they named 'Sarumbashi' after Sarumbash, a local shepherd. Following this expedition Holder published "Climbs among the Peaks of the Adyrsu, Central Caucasus," in the Alpine Journal in 1897.
