= Lateral Range =

Mountain range in Russia, Georgia and Azerbaijan

- Боковой хребет / გვერდითი ქედი
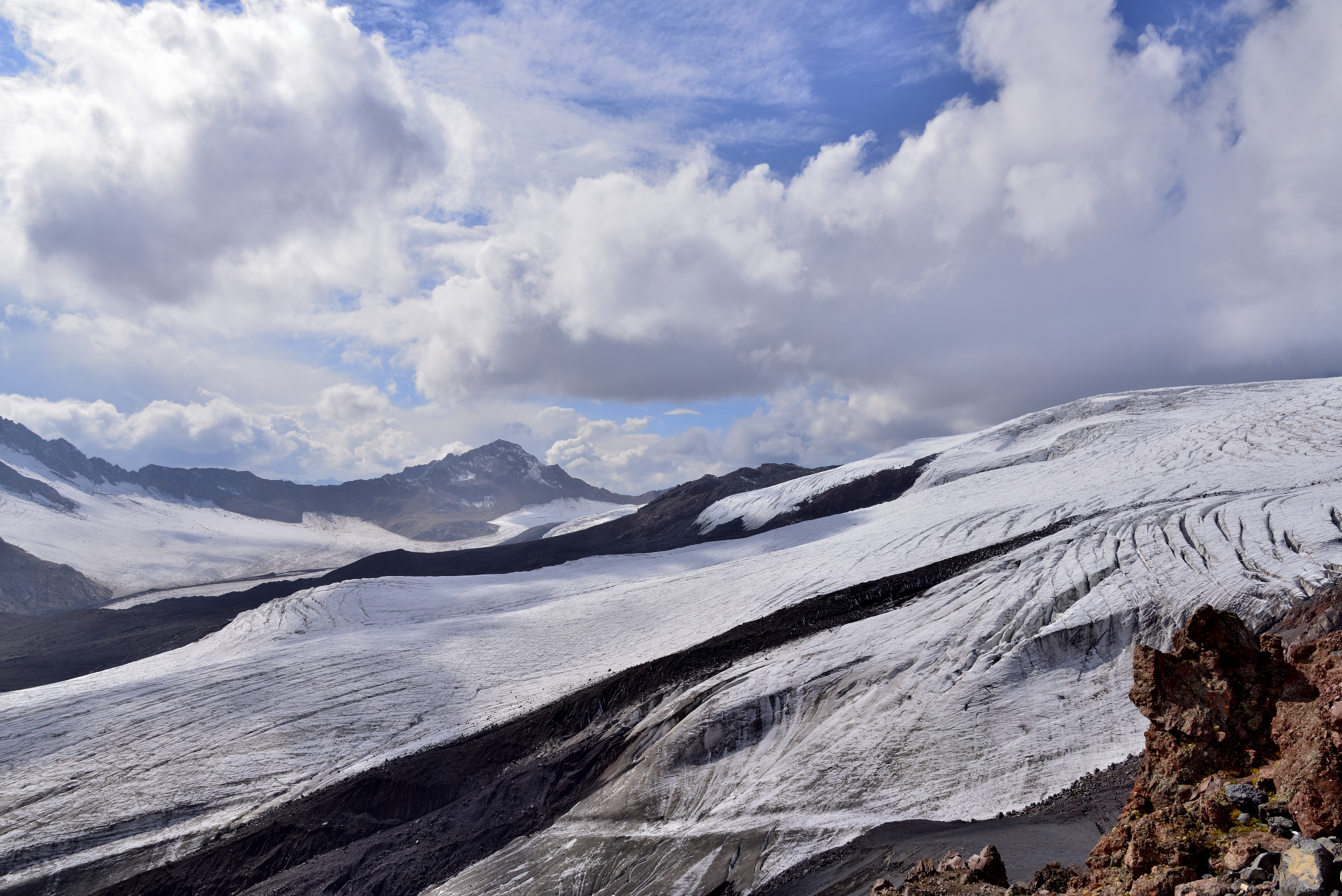
- Side view of the Maly Azau glacier

Highest point
- Peak: Mount Elbrus
- Elevation: 5,642 m (18,510 ft)

Dimensions
- Length: 1,100 km (680 mi) ESE/WNW

Geography
- Location within Caucasus Mountains Location within European Russia
- Countries: Russia, Georgia and Azerbaijan
- Federal subjects: Krasnodar Krai, Karachay-Cherkessia, Kabardino-Balkaria, North Ossetia, Ingushetia, Chechnya and Dagestan
- Range coordinates: 43°0′N 43°24′E
- Parent range: Greater Caucasus

Geology
- Rock age: Paleozoic

The Lateral Range (Note: Russian: Боковой хребет; Georgian: გვერდითი ქედი; Azerbaijani: Yan silsilə) is a mountain range in the Russian Federation and Georgia, with a very small part in Azerbaijan. The range is part of the Greater Caucasus.

Some swathes of the range are protected areas, under the Kabardino-Balkaria Nature Reserve and the North Ossetia Nature Reserve.

== Geology ==
In its western part the range is composed of Paleozoic and Triassic sedimentary rocks, in its central part of Upper Proterozoic and Paleozoic crystalline schist and granite, and in its eastern part of Jurassic shale.

== Geography ==
The Lateral Range is characterized by alpine landforms. It runs parallel to the northern side of the Main Caucasian Range, to the south of the Skalisty Range, along the Krasnodar Territory, Karachay-Cherkessia, Kabardino-Balkaria, North Ossetia, Ingushetia, Chechnya and Dagestan federal subjects of Russia, as well as the countries of Georgia and Azerbaijan. The range consists of somewhat detached mountain massifs, separated by the upper reaches of the rivers flowing from the northern slopes of the Greater Caucasus. The Lateral Range extends from the upper course of the Laba River, a left tributary of the Kuban, in the west, to almost the eastern end of the mountain system. It is made up of two parts: The western one is bound by the valley of the Ardon, and the eastern is a prolongation of the Main Caucasian Range, the dividing range of the Caucasus. The latter coincides with the alignment of the highest peaks of the eastern half of the Greater Caucasus, including the 5,642 meters (18,510 ft) high Elbrus, the 5,203 meters (17,070 ft) high Dykhtau and the 5,100 meters (16,700 ft) high Pushkin Peak.

On the non rocky slopes of the Lateral Range there are alpine meadows, and in the central part there are several glaciated areas. There are high mountain pastures in the lower parts below the glaciers.

== See also ==
- List of highest points of Russian federal subjects
- List of mountains and hills of Russia
- Skalisty Range, Caucasus
