= North Ossetia Nature Reserve =

Nature reserve in North Ossetia, Russia

- Russian: Северо-Осетинский заповедник (Also: Severo-Osetinsky)
- IUCN category Ia (strict nature reserve)
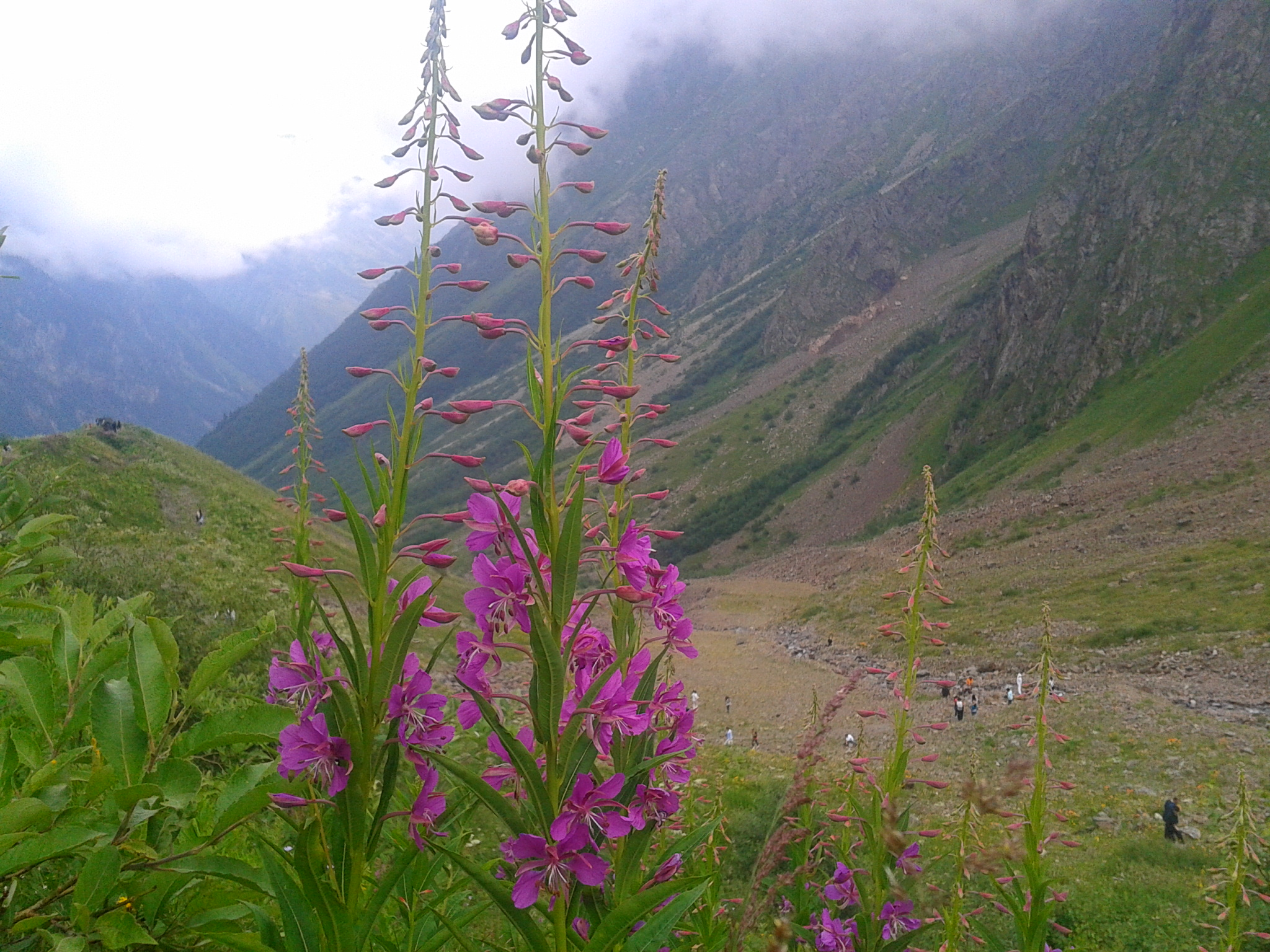
- North Ossetia Zapovednik

- Location within Russia
- Location: North Ossetia-Alania
- Nearest city: Vladikavkaz
- Coordinates: 42°47′0″N 44°5′0″E
- Area: 29,000 hectares (71,661 acres; 112 sq mi)
- Established: 1967
- Governing body: Ministry of Natural Resources and Environment (Russia)
- Website: http://www.zapovednik15-osetia.ru/

North Ossetia Nature Reserve (Russian: Северо-Осетинский заповедник) (also Severo-Osetinsky) is a Russian 'zapovednik' (strict nature reserve) in the high mountains on the northern slope of the Caucasus Mountains with the heights ranging from 650 meters - 4,249 meters. There are 76 glaciers in the reserve with a total area of 37 km^{2} (14 sq mi). The site is centered on the Ardon River valley, in the Alagirsky District of North Ossetia-Alania. It was formally created in 1967, and covers a total area of 29,000 ha (110 sq mi).

== Topography ==
The North Ossetia Reserve has a terrain that steep mountain slopes and deep river valleys. The Ardon River (in English, "Mad River") basin in the reserve has five parallel ridges running north–south. The reserve is bounded on the north by foothills and steppes running down to the town of Alagir, on the east by further north-slope river valleys, on the south by the main ridge of the Caucasus Mountains, and on the west by Alaniya National Park. There are more than 100 rivers and streams in the reserve. The altitude in the boundaries ranges from 650 meters to 4,249 meters; the highest peak is Mt. Uilpata (4,646 m (15,243 ft)). There are four sectors in the reserve:

- Arhonskim (8,685 ha). High array of cirque and hanging glaciers, fed by snow and avalanches. Currently, most of the glaciers are receding.
- Buronsky (6,820 ha).
- Tseyskoe (9,152 ha). The Tseyskoe Glacier, the largest glacier in the reserve's boundaries, is the source of the Tseyskoe River and its gorge. There are the remains of birch forests on the slopes in this sector.
- Fiagdonskaya (4,873 ha). The Fiagdonsky River is the largest tributary of the Ardon river.

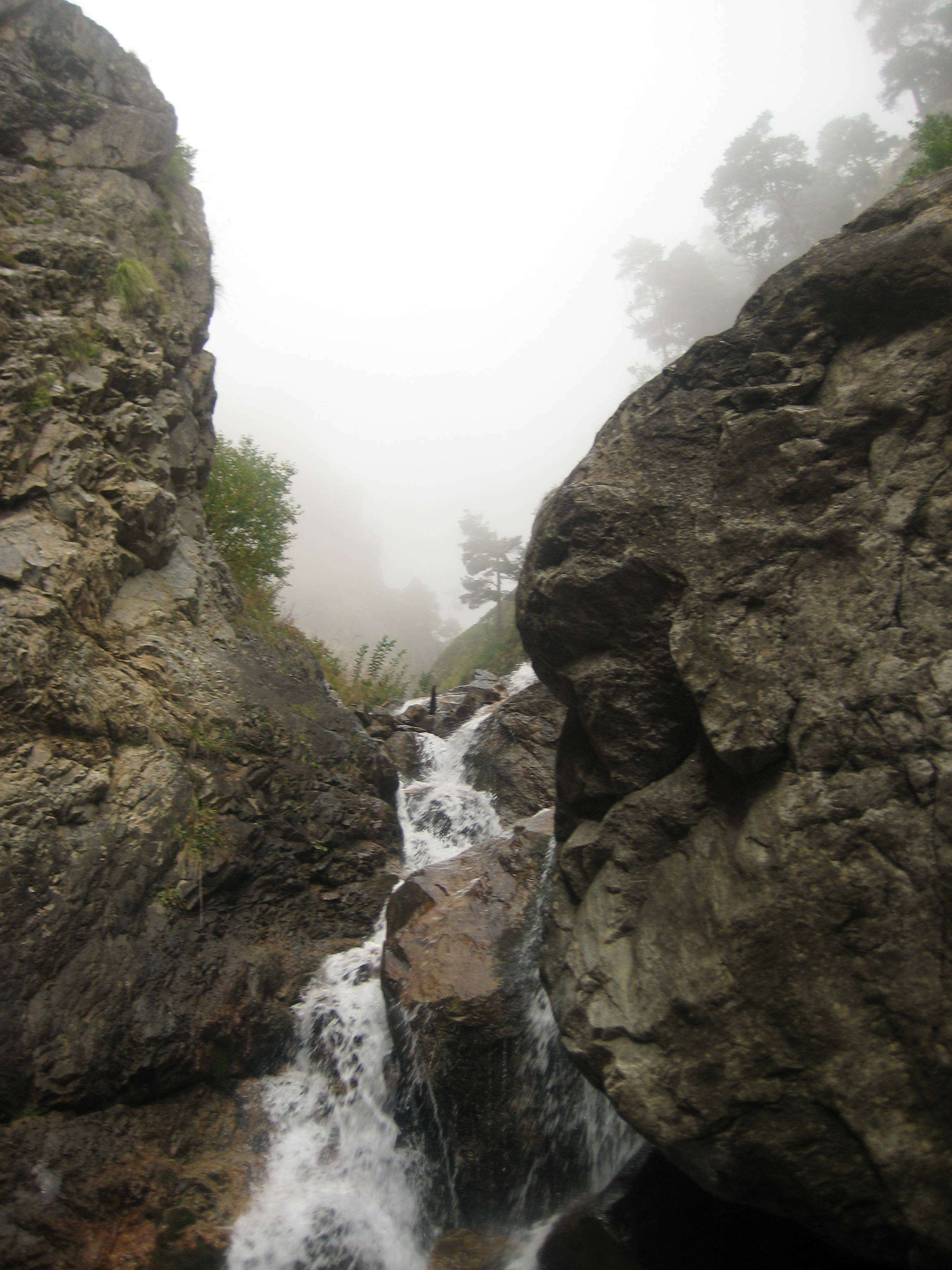
Cascade in North Ossetia Reserve

== Climate and Ecoregion ==
North Ossetia is located in the Caucasus mixed forests ecoregion. This ecoregion is located along the Caucasus Mountains between the Black Sea and the Caspian Sea. It has one of the highest levels of species endemism and diversity in the world: 23% of vascular species, and 10% of vertebrates.

The climate of North Ossetia is Humid continental climate, cool summer (Köppen climate classification (Dfc)). This climate is characterised by long cold winters, and short, cool summers. Average temperature in February (the coldest momnth) is −8.8 °C (16.2 °F), to 12.1 °C (53.8 °F) in July. Average annual precipitation is 800 mm/year in the middle altitudes.

== Flora and fauna ==
Rocks, scree, and glaciers are over 70% of the terrain in the reserve. The other 30%, at the lower altitudes, is alpine meadow and forest. Typical trees on the lower north slopes are beech and hornbeam (replaced by birch and maple at higher levels), with undergrowth of elderberry, Caucasian bilberry, and Rhododendron. On the south-facing slopes are oak and hazel communities. Alder stands grow along the river bottoms. Scientists on the reserve have recorded 1,383 species of vascular plants, 200 of which are endemic to the Caucasus.

The animal life of the reserve reflects the location at the meeting of several different ecozones. Species that are characteristic of the Circumboreal region (mouse, roe deer, brook trout, golden eagle, etc.) are mixed with steppe and alpine species (stone marten, Dagestan goat), and a number of introduced species (partridge, Jackal, chamois). There is a small herd of bison. Scientists on the reserve have recorded 58 species of mammals, and 208 species of birds.

== Ecoeducation and access ==
As a strict nature reserve, the North Ossetia Reserve is mostly closed to the general public, although scientists and those with 'environmental education' purposes can make arrangements with park management for visits. There are quite a few 'ecotourist' routes, however, that are open to the public. Tickets may be purchased at the entrance points, and tourists must stay on the prescribed routes and leave the same day. The main office is in the city of Alagir.

== See also ==
- List of Russian Nature Reserves (class 1a 'zapovedniks')
- National Parks of Russia
- Skalisty Range & Lateral Range
- Main Caucasian Range
