= Mount Shani =

Mountain in Georgia and Russia

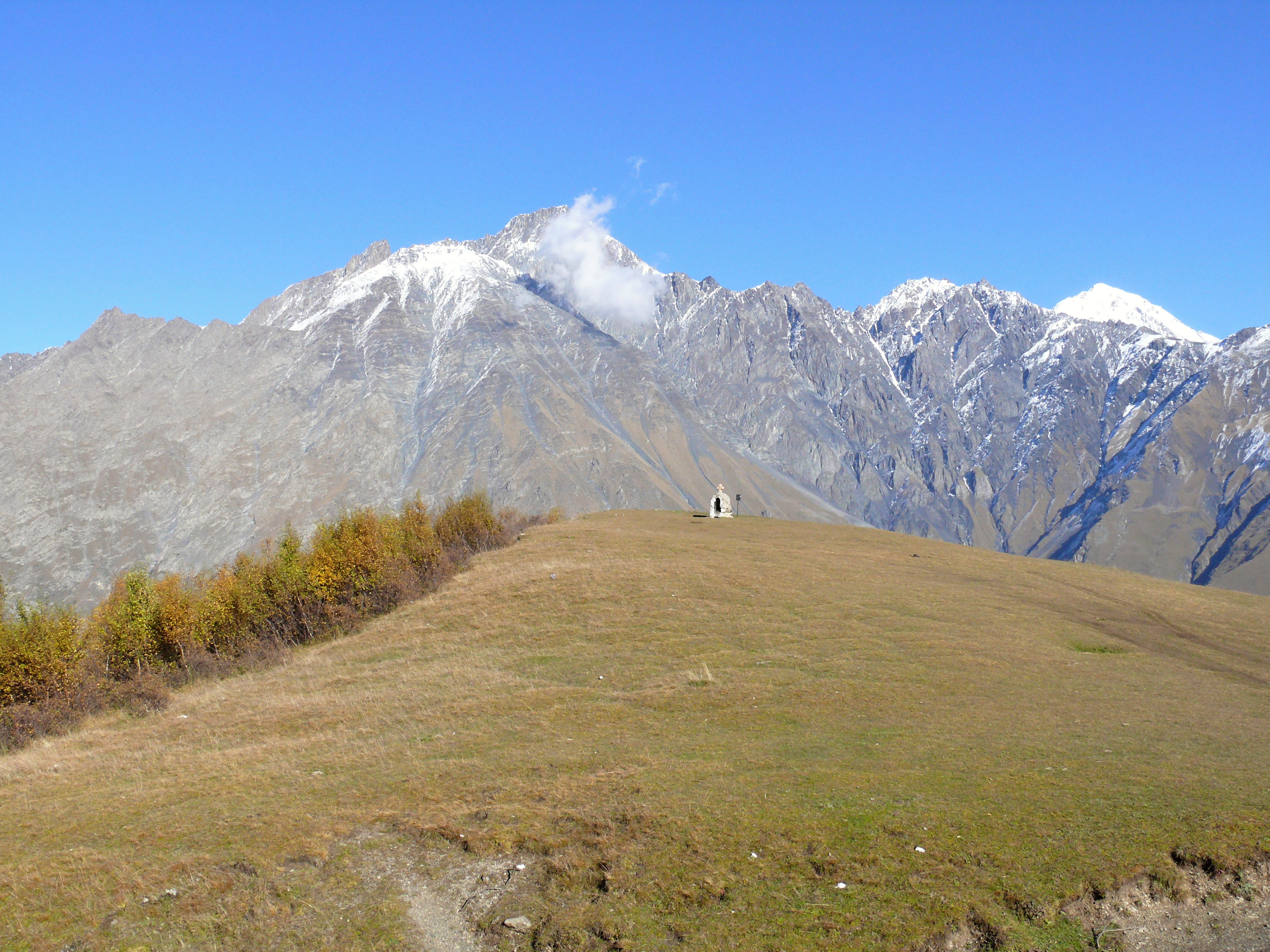

Highest point
- Elevation: 4,451 m (14,603 ft)
- Prominence: 1,775 m (5,823 ft)
- Isolation: 19.14 km (11.89 mi)
- Listing: Ultra, Ribu
- Coordinates: 42°40′33″N 44°45′27″E

Naming
- Native name: Shan, Shanloam

Geography
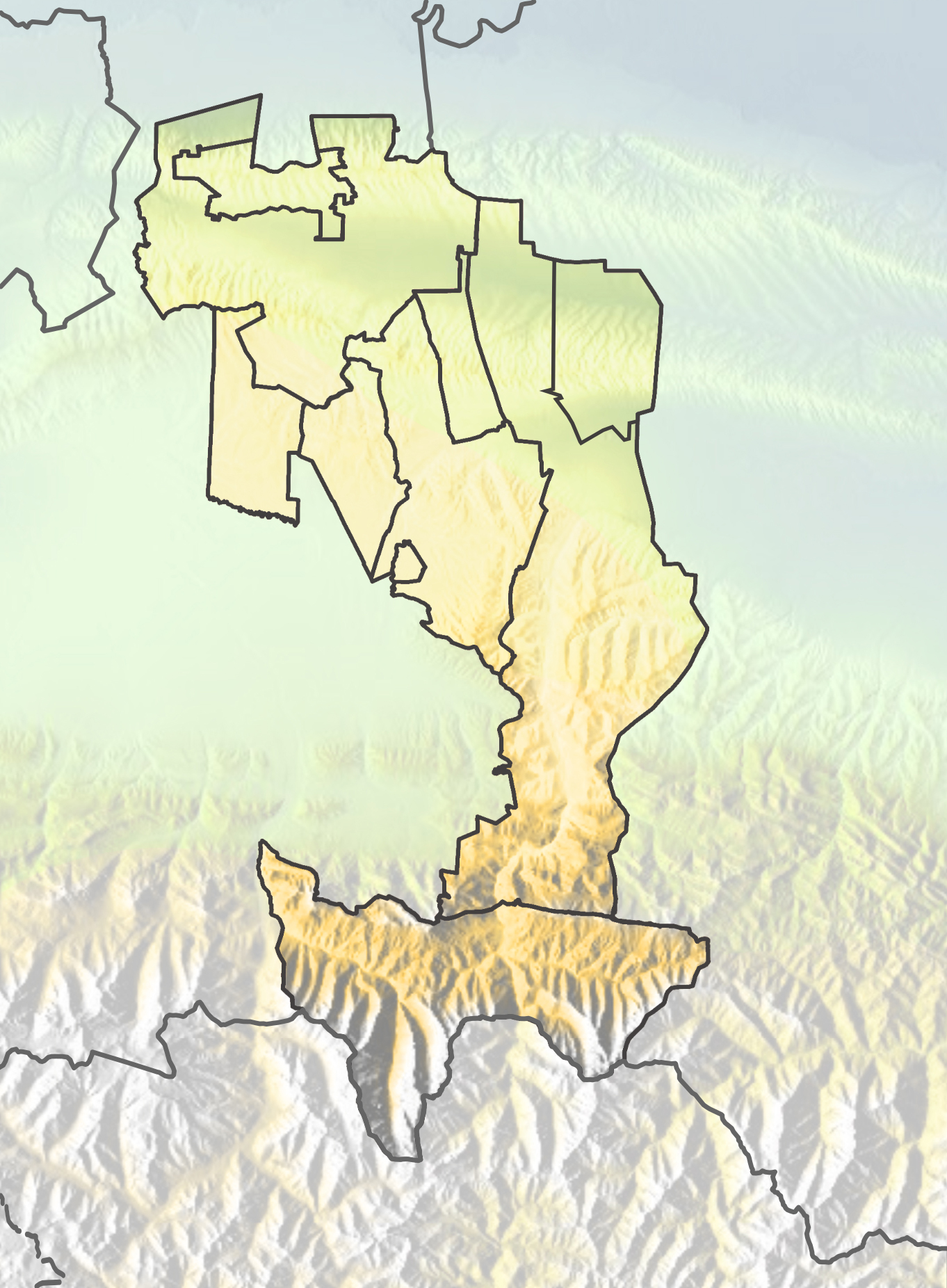
- Location within Georgia Location within Republic of Ingushetia
- Location: Georgia–Russia border
- Countries: Georgia and Ingushetia
- Parent range: Main Caucasian Range; Caucasus

Mt. Shani (Ingush: Шанлоам, lit. ''icy mountain''; Georgian: შანი; Russian: Шан) also known as Shan and Shanloam is a mountain in the Caucasus. It has an elevation of 4,451 metres (14,603 ft) and is on the international border between Georgia and Ingushetia, Russia.

The mountain rises approx. nine kilometres to the east of Stepantsminda, Georgia. Access from Georgia is through the Kistinka gorge (alt. Brolistskali), which separates the Khuro massif from Mt. Shani. From the Ingushetian side, Mt. Shani can be accessed through the gorge of the river Shandon.

== Etymology ==
The oronym derives from the Ingush word sha, shan ("ice/icy").

== Gallery ==
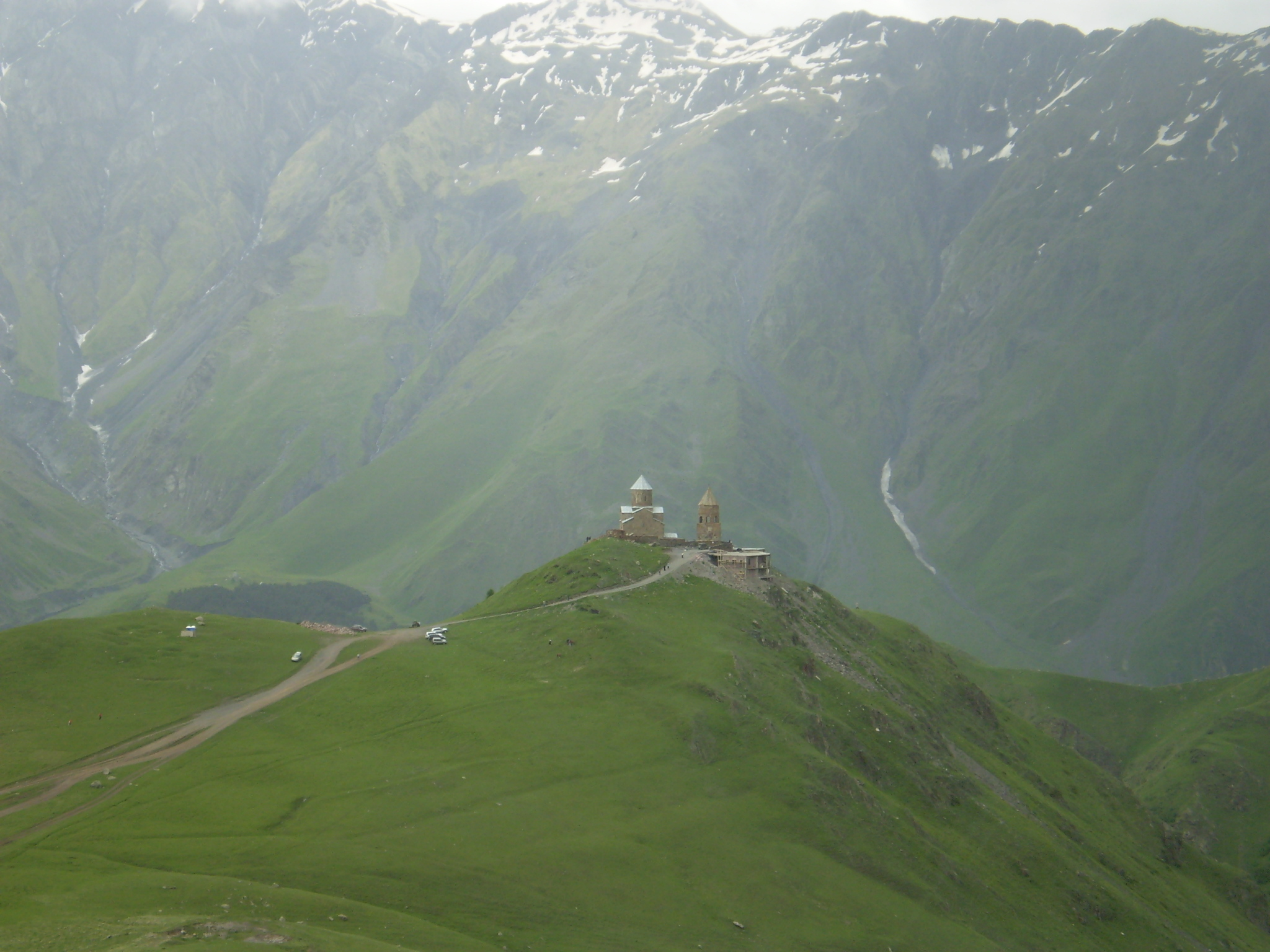
Gergeti Trinity Church in the foreground with the base of Mount Shani in the background.

== See also ==
- List of highest points of Russian federal subjects
- List of European ultra prominent peaks
- List of ultras of West Asia

== Sources ==
- Barakhoeva, Nina; Kodzoev, Nurdin; Khayrov, Bayali (2016). Ингушско-русский и русско-ингушский словарь терминов [Ingush-Russian and Russian-Ingush dictionary of terms]. Magas, Russia: ГБУ «ИнгНИИ».
- Dzaourova, Deysi (2023-01-08). "Горы расположенные на территории Республики Ингушетия" [Mountains located on the territory of the Republic of Ingushetia] (PDF). NovaInfo.Ru (135) – via Ingush State University.
