= Georgia–Russia border =

International border

Georgia–Russia border Abkhazia–Russia border South Ossetia–Russia border
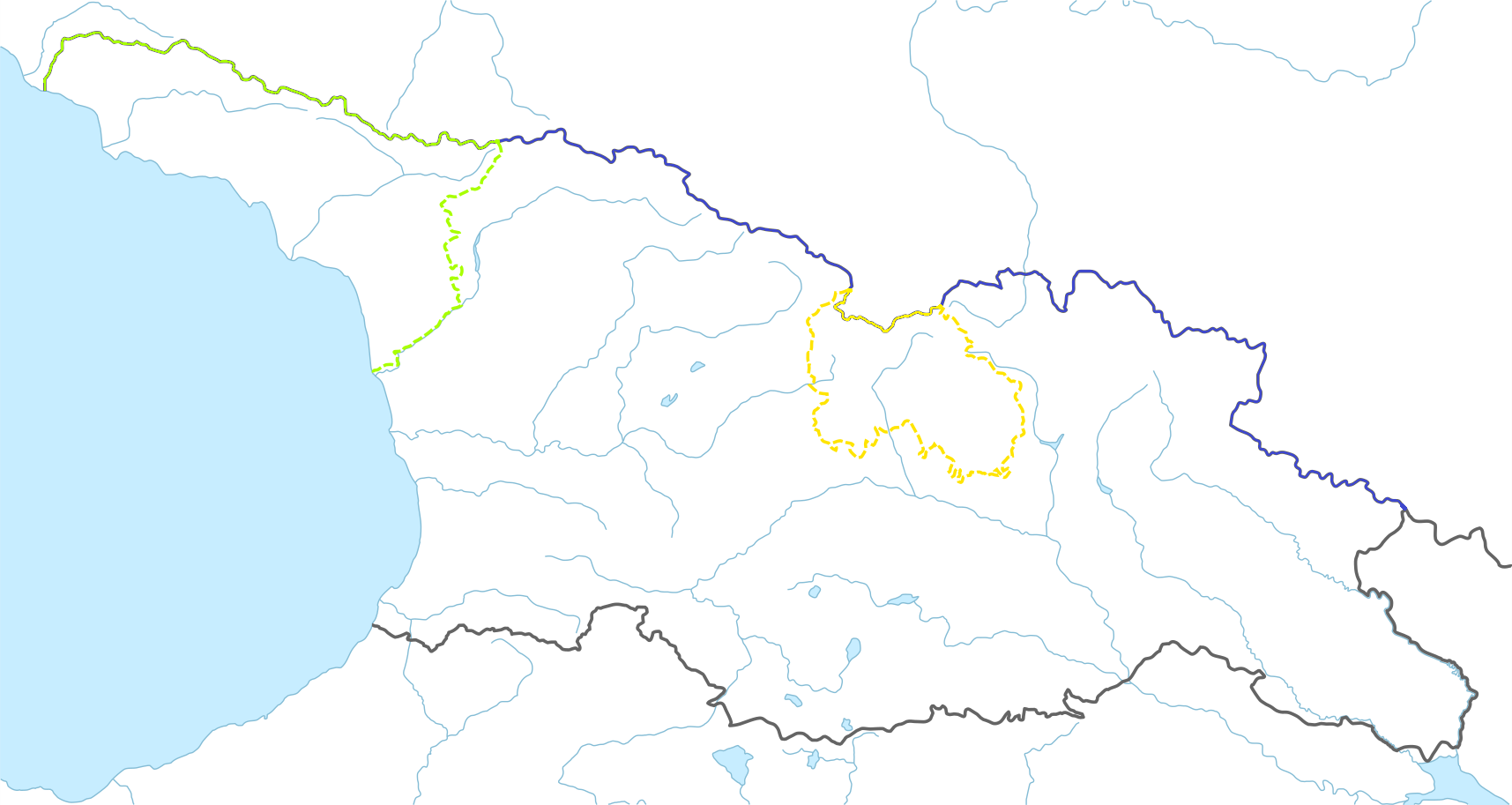
- State Border of Georgia with Russian Federation. Blue line = border between Russia and Georgia. Green line = de-facto border between Russia and Abkhazia since 2008, Yellow line = de-facto border between Russia and South Ossetia since 2008. Green dotted line = de-facto border between Russian-occupied Abkhazia and the non-occupied part of Georgia since 2008, Yellow dotted line = de-facto border between Russian-occupied South Ossetia and the non-occupied part of Georgia since 2008.

Characteristics
- Entities: Russia Georgia (Abkhazia, South Ossetia)
- Length: 920 km (de jure); 594.9 km (Russia-Georgia, de-facto); 255.4 km (Russia-Abkhazia, de-facto); 70 km (Russia-South Ossetia, de-facto)

History
- Established: 1918, 1920; Transcaucasian Democratic Federative Republic, Treaty of Moscow (1920)
- Current shape: 1991, 2008; Dissolution of the Soviet Union, Russian invasion of Georgia

Georgian and Russian boundary markers

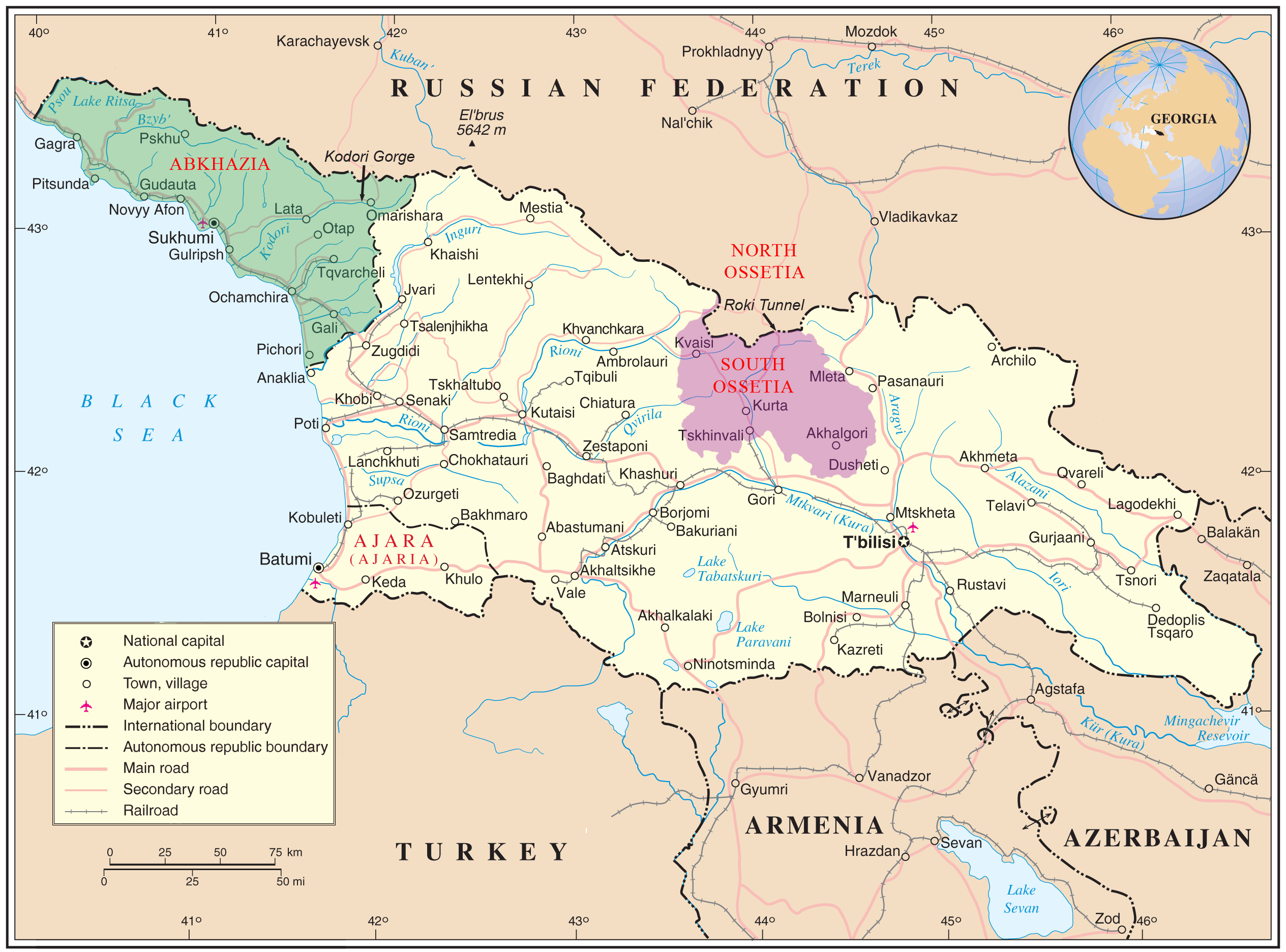
Map of Georgia showing the border with Russia, as well as the disputed Abkhazian and South Ossetian sections

The Georgia–Russia border is the state border between Georgia and Russia. It is de jure 920 km in length and runs from the Black Sea coast in the west and then along the Greater Caucasus Mountains to the tripoint with Azerbaijan in the east, thus closely following the conventional boundary between Europe and Asia. In 2008, Russia (and later four other states) recognized the independence of two self-declared republics within Georgia (Abkhazia and South Ossetia), meaning that in a de facto sense the border is now split into four sections: the Abkhazia–Russia border in the west, the western Georgia–Russia border between Abkhazia and South Ossetia, the South Ossetia–Russia border and the eastern Georgia–Russia border between South Ossetia and Azerbaijan. At present most of the international community refuses to recognise these two territories and regards them as belonging to Georgia.

Regions of Abkhazia and South Ossetia are under Russian occupation, while the border itself is guarded by FSB Border Service of Russia and State Security Service of Abkhazia. Georgia considers any attempt to demarcate a boundary between the breakaway regions and Russia as illegitimate.

== Description ==
=== Georgia-Russia border (western section) ===
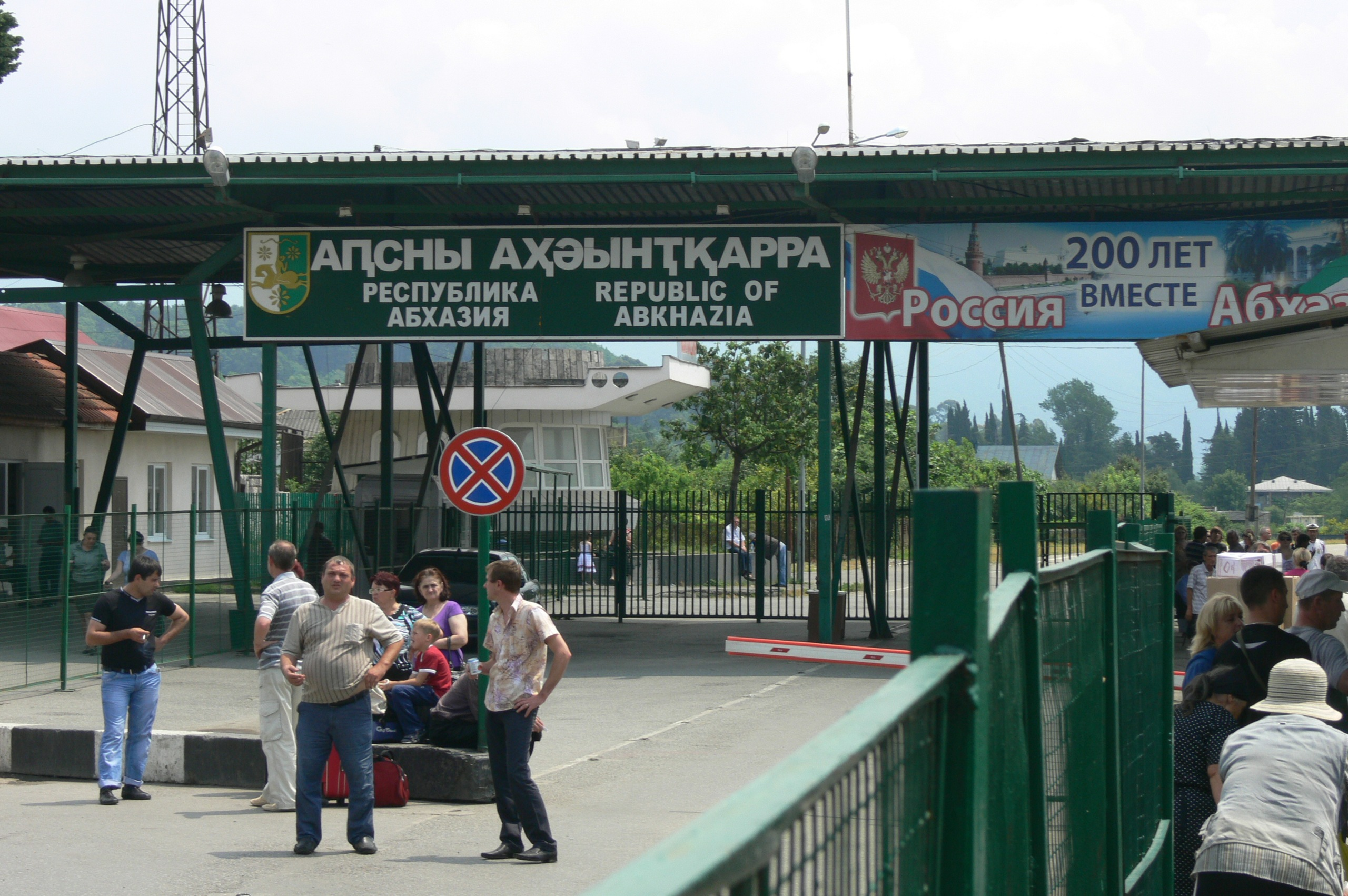
The Psou crossing point

The border starts in the west at the point where the Psou river enters the Black Sea, just west of the town of the Leselidze. It then follows the Psou as it flows north and then east to the vicinity of Mount Agepsta, whereupon it then follows the crest of the Caucasus Mountains broadly south-eastwards over to the mount Zekara. Mount Dombay-Ulgen, Shota Rustaveli Peak, Mount Janga, Mount Lalveri, and Mount Khalatsa are prominent peaks of this section.

=== Georgia-Russia border (eastern section) ===
The eastern section of the Georgia–Russia border starts at the mount Zekara and continues eastwards along the Caucasus Mountains to the tripoint with Azerbaijan. Mount Diklosmta, Mount Kazbek, Mount Jimara, Mount Shani, Mount Shkhara and Mount Tebulosmta are notable peaks of this section.

=== History ===
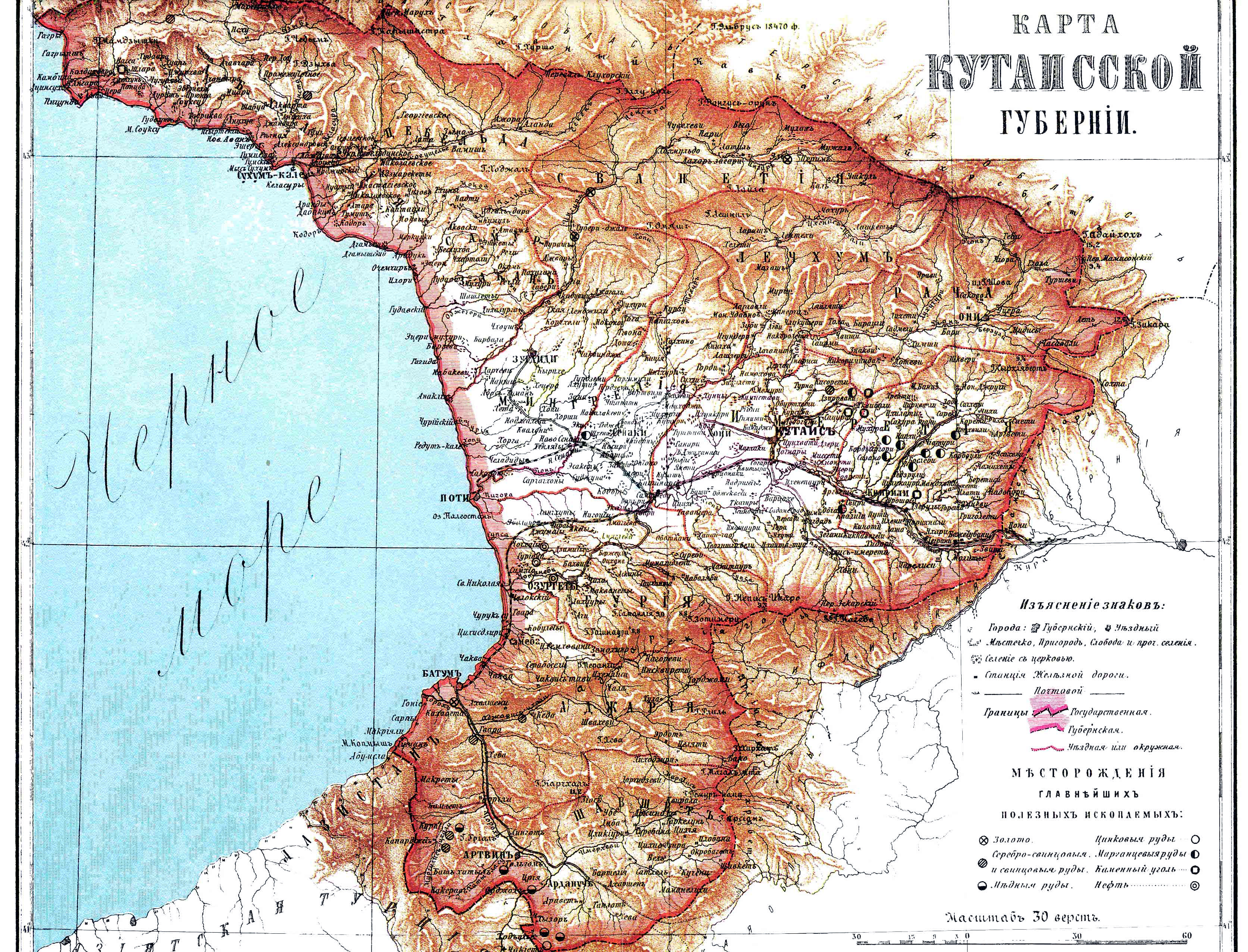
Kutaisi governorate

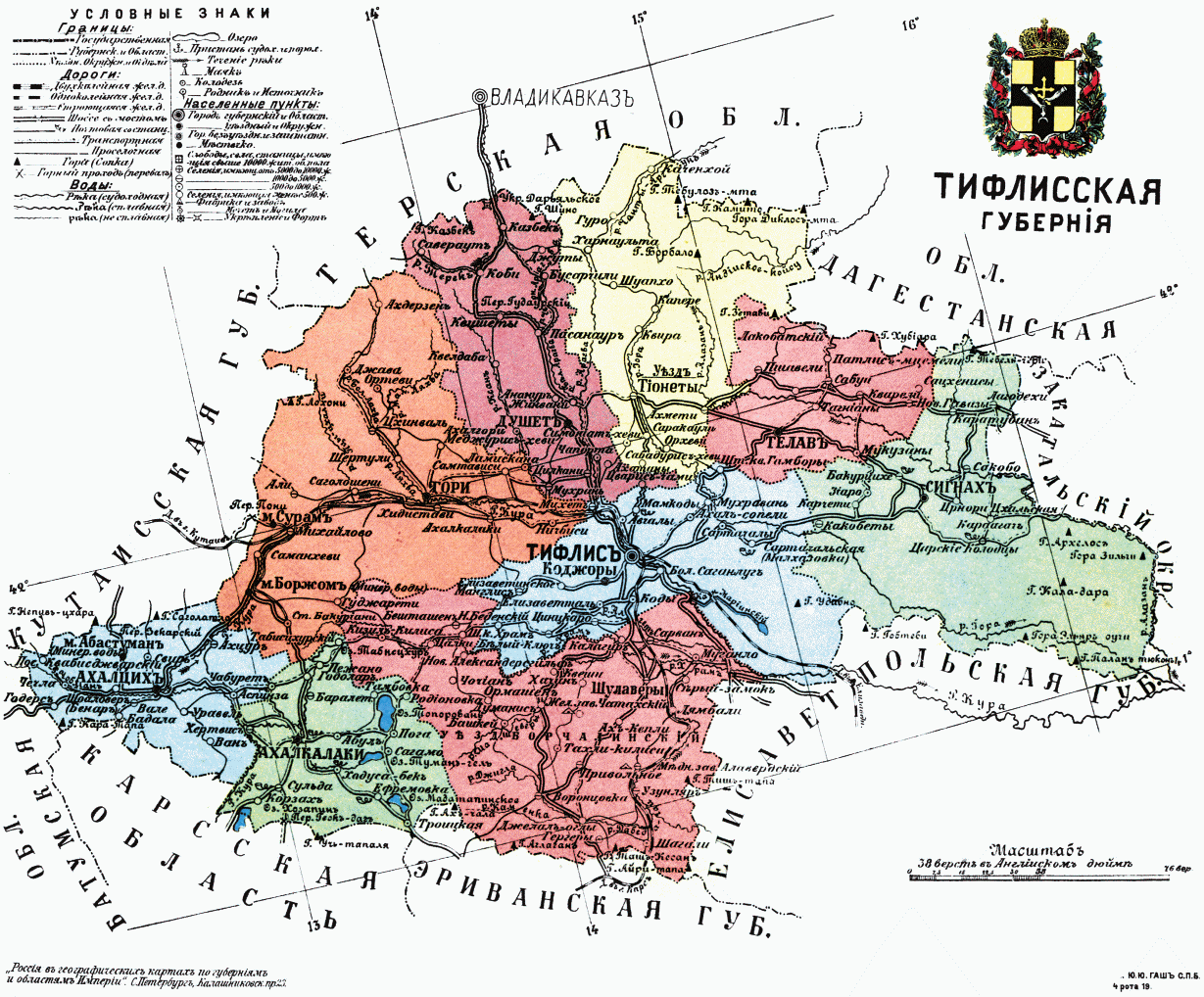
Tiflis governorate

Maps of the former Kutaisi and Tiflis governorates, the northern borders of which now form most of the modern Georgia/Abkhazia/South Ossetia-Russia border

During the 19th the Caucasus region was contested between the declining Ottoman Empire, Persia and Russia, which was expanding southwards. Russia formally annexed the eastern Georgian Kingdom of Kartli and Kakheti in 1801, followed by the western Georgian Kingdom of Imereti in 1804, following the Russian treaty with North Ossetia and the construction of Vladikavkaz as a base in 1784. Construction of the Georgian Military Road was begun in 1799, following the Treaty of Georgievsk. Over the course of the 1800s Russia continued to push its frontier southwards, at the expense of the Persian and Ottoman Empires.

The Georgian territories were initially organised into the Georgia Governorate, then later split off as the Georgia-Imeretia Governorate from 1840 to 1846, and finally divided into the governorates of Tiflis and Kutaisi. The northern border of these territories roughly corresponds with the modern Georgia–Russia border i.e. running along the Caucasus Mountain range. Abkhazia became semi-autonomous principality within the Russian Empire in 1810, with its eastern border with other Georgian kingdoms and principalities set along the river Ghalizga. In 1864 Abkhazia was re-designated as the 'Sukhum Military District' (from 1883 Sukhum Okrug, within Kutaisi Governorate), incorporating the Samurzakano region west of the Ingur river which had hitherto been part of Kutais governorate and generally considered historical Georgian land. However the western border of Abkhazia was set at the Begepsta river, with lands west of this attached to the Chermorskii okrug in modern Krasnodar Krai.

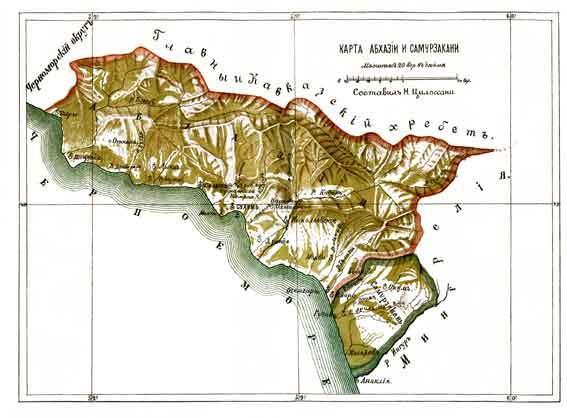
An 1899 map depicting Sukhum okrug with Samurzakano

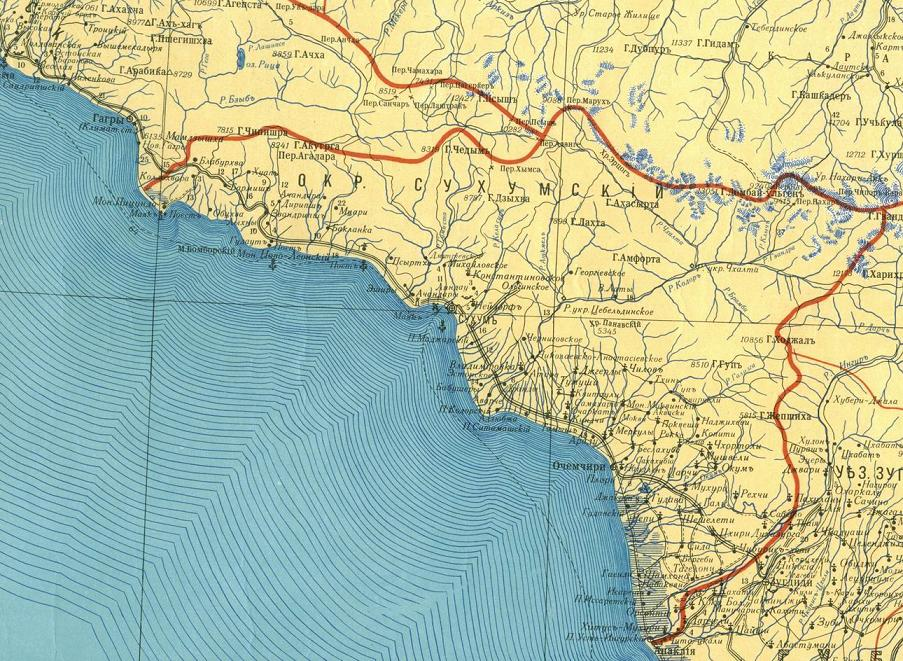
A 1903/04 map of Sukhum okrug

Late 19th- to early 20th-century maps of Abkhazia

In 1904 the western Abkhaz border was changed, with the area west and north of the Bzyb River removed and merged into Chernmorski okrug, apparently so as to include a new luxury holiday resort at Gagra built by Duke Alexander of Oldenburg. Following the 1917 Russian Revolution, the peoples of the southern Caucasus had seceded from Russia, declared the Transcaucasian Democratic Federative Republic (TDFR) in 1918 and started peace talks with the Ottomans. Meanwhile, Sukhum Okrug had declared itself semi-autonomous on 9 November 1917 under the Abkhazian Peoples Council (APC). At the instigation of the Georgian politician Akaki Chkhenkeli, the 1904 boundary change of western Abkhazia was reversed in December 1917 and the old Begepsta river border restored. In early 1918 the APC met with Georgian leaders, and the two sides made an initial agreement that Abkhazia would constitute Sukhum okrug, including Samurzakano (despite its Mingrelian majority), and stretching along the Black Sea coast as far at the river Mzymta. The Bolsheviks invaded Abkhazia in April 1918 but were repulsed the following month.

Meanwhile, internal disagreements in the TDFR led to Georgia leaving the federation in May 1918, followed shortly thereafter by Armenia and Azerbaijan. Georgian and Abkhaz officials met in an attempt to hammer out a deal. Seeking a protection and security, the APC concluded an agreement to unify with Georgia on 11 June 1918. Discussions between Georgian and Russian Volunteer Army forces in early 1919 at demarcating a border proved difficult. Some Georgians initially claimed a north-western border that stretched north-west as far as the Makopse river. British forces active in the region proposed a border along the river Mzymta. By mid-1919 a stalemate had emerged whereby the river Mekhadry provided a de facto boundary. Russia recognised the independence of Georgia via the Treaty of Moscow (1920). It was agreed that Georgia would consist of the former Governorates of Tiflis, Kutaisi and Batumi, plus Sukhum and Zakatal okrugs. Article 3.1 of the Treaty stated that "The state frontier between Russia and Georgia, runs from the Black Sea, along the river Psou to Mount Akhakheha, passes over Mount Akhakheha and Mount Agapet, and continues along the northern frontier of the former Chernomorsk, Kutais, and Tiflis provinces to the Zakatalsk circuit and along the eastern boundary thereof up to the frontier of Armenia." Article 3.4 stated that a more precise demarcation would occur in due course. Following the Soviet invasion of Georgia, it became part of the Transcaucasian Socialist Federative Soviet Republic within the USSR until 1936.

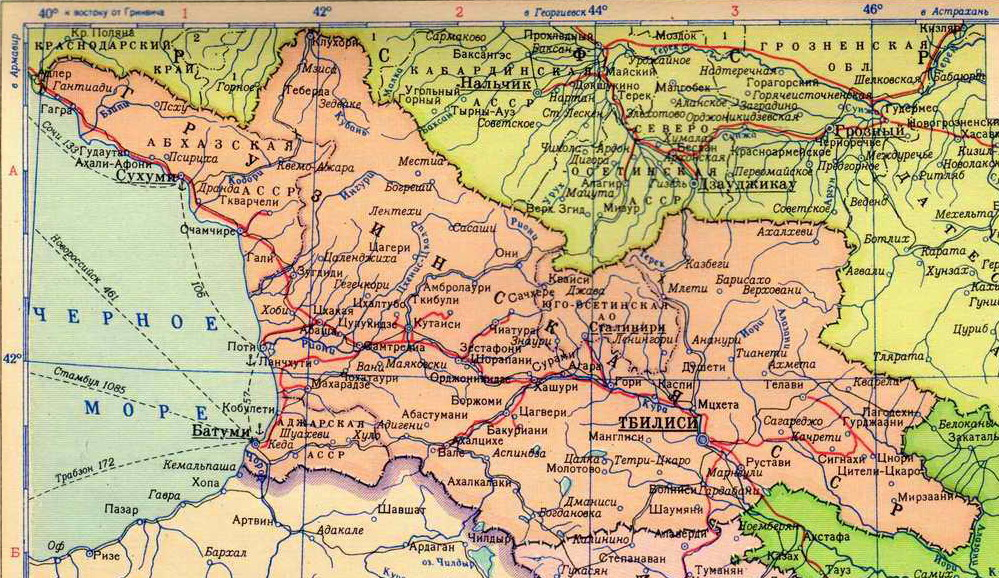
Map of Georgia from 1954, showing the areas annexed to Georgia in the north

Following Joseph Stalin's deportation of ethnic groups accused of collaboration with the Germany, the Georgia–Russia border was altered in Georgia's favour in 1944, with Georgia gaining Klukhori from Karachay-Cherkessia in the west (comprising Karachayevsk, Teberda and Mount Elbrus) and Akhalkhevi from the Chechen-Ingush ASSR in the east (comprising Itum-Kale and surrounding lands). Following the death of Stalin, these changes were reversed from 1955 to 1957 and the pre-1944 border restored.

The boundary became an international frontier in 1991 following the dissolution of the Soviet Union and the independence of its constituent republics. However fighting broke between Georgia and the autonomous regions of Abkhazia and South Ossetia, resulting in the de facto independence of both. During the War in Abkhazia (1992–1993) when fighting had begun, the 221 km Abkhazian section of the railway extending from Psou roadside stop (Abkhazia–Russia border) up to Ingur roadside stop (Abkhazia-Georgia border) had been closed for Armenia and Georgia since Aug 14 1992, after the railway bridge over the River of Ingur (dividing Georgia from Abkhazia) was detonated. On October 6, 1992, the Abkhaz forces captured Gagra and reached the Russian border shortly thereafter. The Psou river, which runs between the Abkhaz-Russian border, is vital for economic activity. It is also used as a route for smuggling illegal goods.

Georgia and Russia began work on delimiting their border in 1993. In 2008, following the Russia–Georgia war, Russia recognised the independence of both South Ossetia and Abkhazia. As a result, all border discussions with Georgia were ended, however the Abkhaz and Russian authorities have continued work on that section of the border.

In 2011 a dispute arose over the village of Aibgha as Russia and Abkhazia set about demarcating their common border. Russia proposed annexing Aibgha to Krasnodar Krai, a move which was opposed by the Abkhaz government. Georgia has opposed any moves to transfer what it sees as Georgian territory.

== Border crossings ==
The only Georgia–Russia border crossing is at Zemo Larsi/Verkhny Lars on the Georgian Military Highway, connecting Kazbegi (Georgia) and Vladikavkaz (in the Russian republic North Ossetia-Alania). There is an Akbkhazia-Russia border crossing point at Psou-Adler, and a South Ossetia-Russia border crossing at Nizhniy Zermag–Zemo Roka (the Roki Tunnel).

== See also ==
- Abkhazia–Russia relations
- Georgia–Russia relations
- Russia–South Ossetia relations
