= Mount Khalatsa =

Mountain on the border of Georgia and Russia

- Location within Georgia Location within Racha-Lechkhumi and Kvemo Svaneti

Highest point
- Elevation: 3,938 m (12,920 ft)
- Prominence: 1,118 m (3,668 ft)
- Isolation: 14.76 km (9.17 mi)
- Listing: Ribu
- Coordinates: 42°35′56″N 43°50′12″E

Geography
- Location: South Ossetia, Georgia / North Ossetia–Alania, Russia
- Parent range: Caucasus

Mount Khalatsa (Georgian: ხალაწა, romanized: khalats'a) or Khalaskhokh (Iron Ossetic: Халасхох; literally: "frost mount") is the highest point of South Ossetia, a disputed region in Georgia, with an altitude of 3,938 metres (12,920 ft). It is located on the border between South Ossetia and North Ossetia–Alania, a Russian autonomous republic.

== See also ==
- Geography of Georgia (country)
- List of countries by highest point (Countries with disputed sovereignty)
