= Main Caucasian Range =

Mountain range in Russia, Georgia and Azerbaijan

- Главный Кавказский хребет კავკასიონის მთავარი წყალგამყოფი ქედი Baş Qafqaz silsiləsi
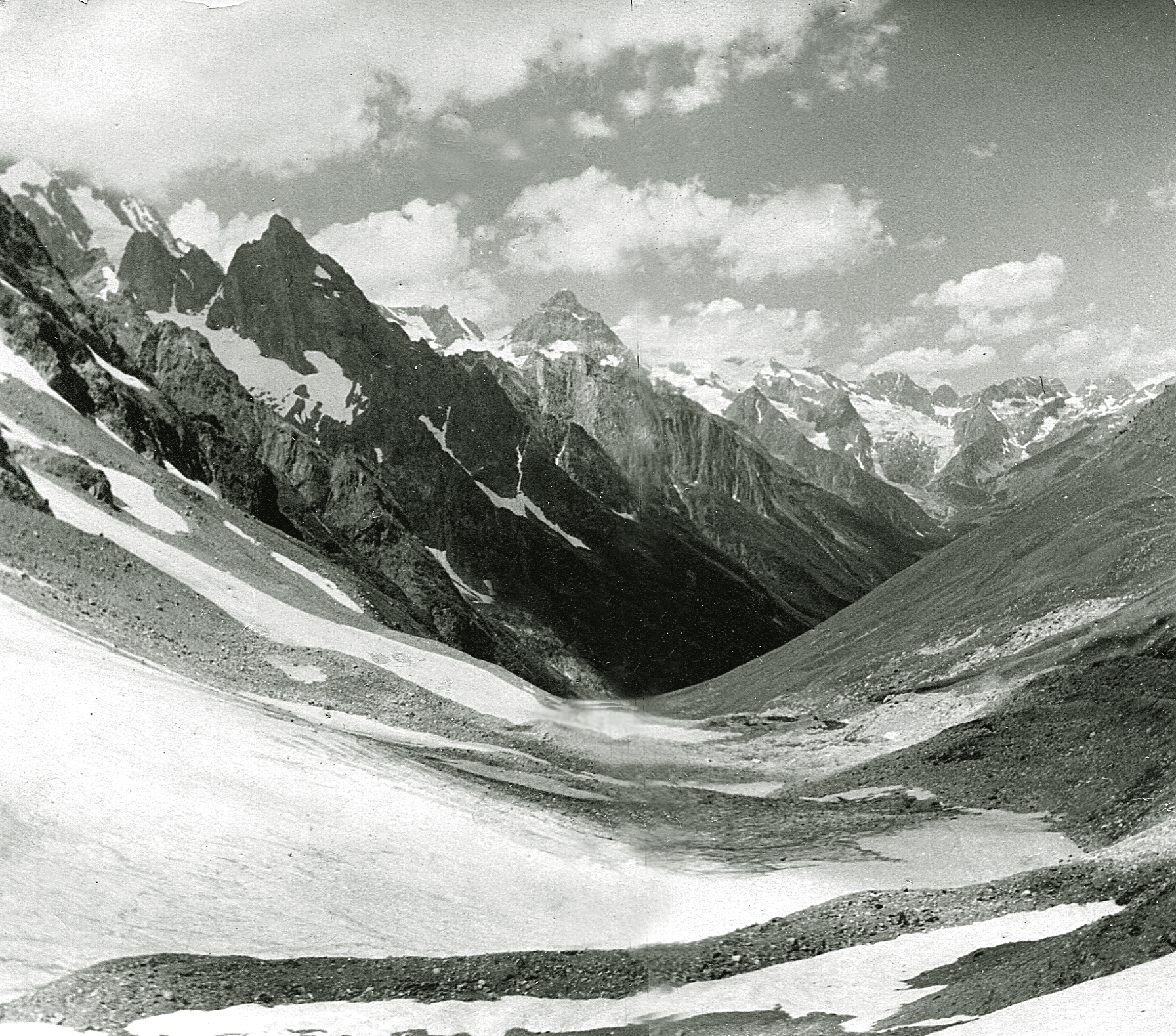
- View from the Chuchkhur Pass

Highest point
- Peak: Shkhara
- Elevation: 5,193 m (17,037 ft)
- Coordinates: 43°00′02″N 43°06′44″E

Dimensions
- Length: 1,200 km (750 mi) ESE/WNW
- Width: 180 km (110 mi) NNE/SSW

Geography
- Location within Caucasus Mountains Location within European Russia
- Countries: Russia, Georgia and Azerbaijan
- Federal subjects: Abkhazia, Adygea, Krasnodar Krai, Karachay-Cherkessia, Kabardino-Balkaria, North Ossetia, Ingushetia, Chechnya and Dagestan
- Range coordinates: 42°36′N 43°50′E
- Parent range: Greater Caucasus

Geology
- Rock age: Paleozoic

The Main Caucasian Range (Note: Russian: Главный Кавказский хребет; Georgian: კავკასიონის მთავარი წყალგამყოფი ქედი; Azerbaijani: Baş Qafqaz silsiləsi) is a mountain range in Russia, Georgia, and Azerbaijan. It is the dividing range of the Greater Caucasus.

The protected areas of the range are the Teberda Nature Reserve, Kabardino-Balkaria Nature Reserve and the North Ossetia Nature Reserve.

== Geography ==
The Main Caucasian Range marks the divide between the North Caucasus to the north and the South Caucasus to the south. It stretches from Mount Chugush near the Black Sea to the Khizi District of Azerbaijan near the Caspian Sea. The main range runs parallel to and south of the Lateral Range, extending along the Russian federal subjects of Adygea, Krasnodar Krai, Karachay-Cherkessia, Kabardino-Balkaria, North Ossetia, Ingushetia, Chechnya, and Dagestan, as well as Georgia (including the disputed region of Abkhazia) and Azerbaijan. The range is characterized by numerous alpine landforms and, unlike its parallel ranges to the north, it forms a continuous, uninterrupted, system of mountain ranges.

The Main Caucasian Range forms a watershed, separating the basins of rivers flowing on the northern slopes of the Greater Caucasus, such as the Samur, Kuban, Terek and Sulak, from those flowing on the southern slopes of the mountain system, such as the Kodori, Enguri, Rioni and Kura.

The highest and rockiest section of the range is located in its central part. Although not as high as the topmost summits of the Lateral Range to the north, the highest elevations of the Main Caucasian Range include the 5,193 meters (17,037 ft) high Shkhara, the 4,466 meters (14,652 ft) high Mount Bazardüzü —highest point of Dagestan— and the 4,451 meters (14,603 ft) high Mount Shani —highest point of Ingushetia.

There are several glaciated areas in the range system, including Bezengi the largest glacier in the Caucasus. Parts of the lower and middle slopes of the mountains are covered by forests up to heights of about 2,000 meters (6,600 ft).

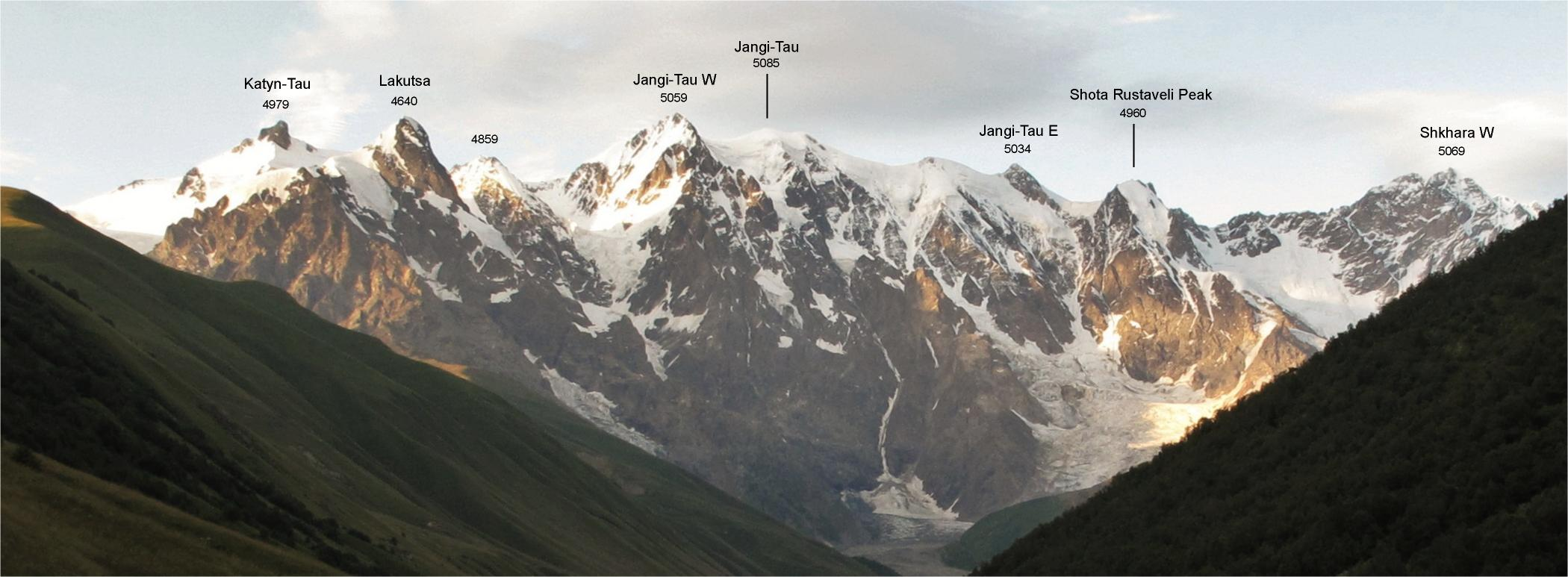
Panoramic view of the Main Caucasian Range between the Katyn-Tau and Shkhara peaks from the Georgian side.

== See also ==
- Highest points of Russian Federal subjects
- List of mountains and hills of Russia
- Skalisty Range, Caucasus
