= Shota Rustaveli Peak =

Mountain in Georgia and Russia

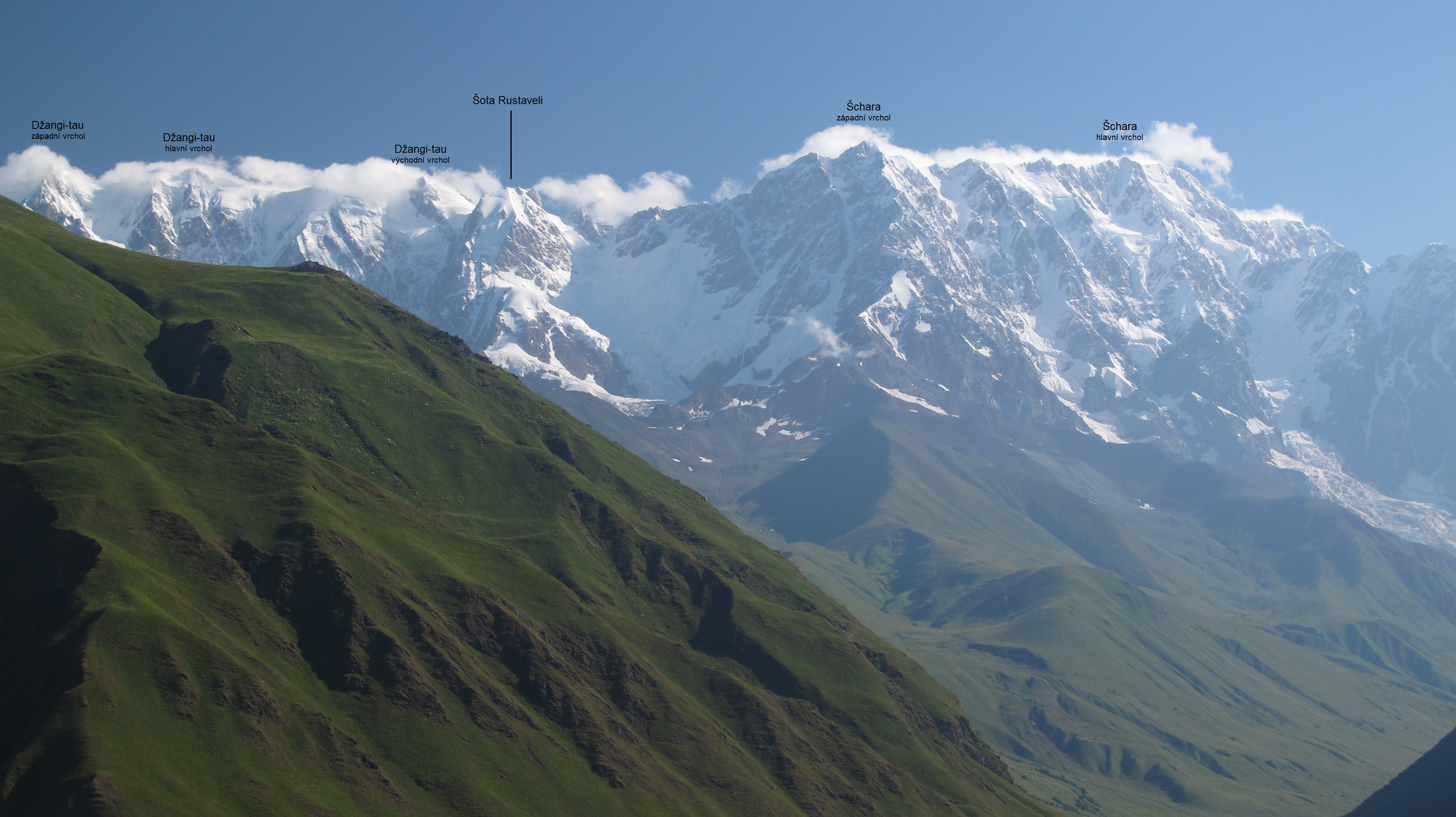
- Shota Rustaveli Peak.

Highest point
- Elevation: 4,960 m (16,270 ft)
- Prominence: 88 m (289 ft)
- Isolation: 0.47 km (0.29 mi)
- Coordinates: 43°00′31″N 43°04′26″E

Geography
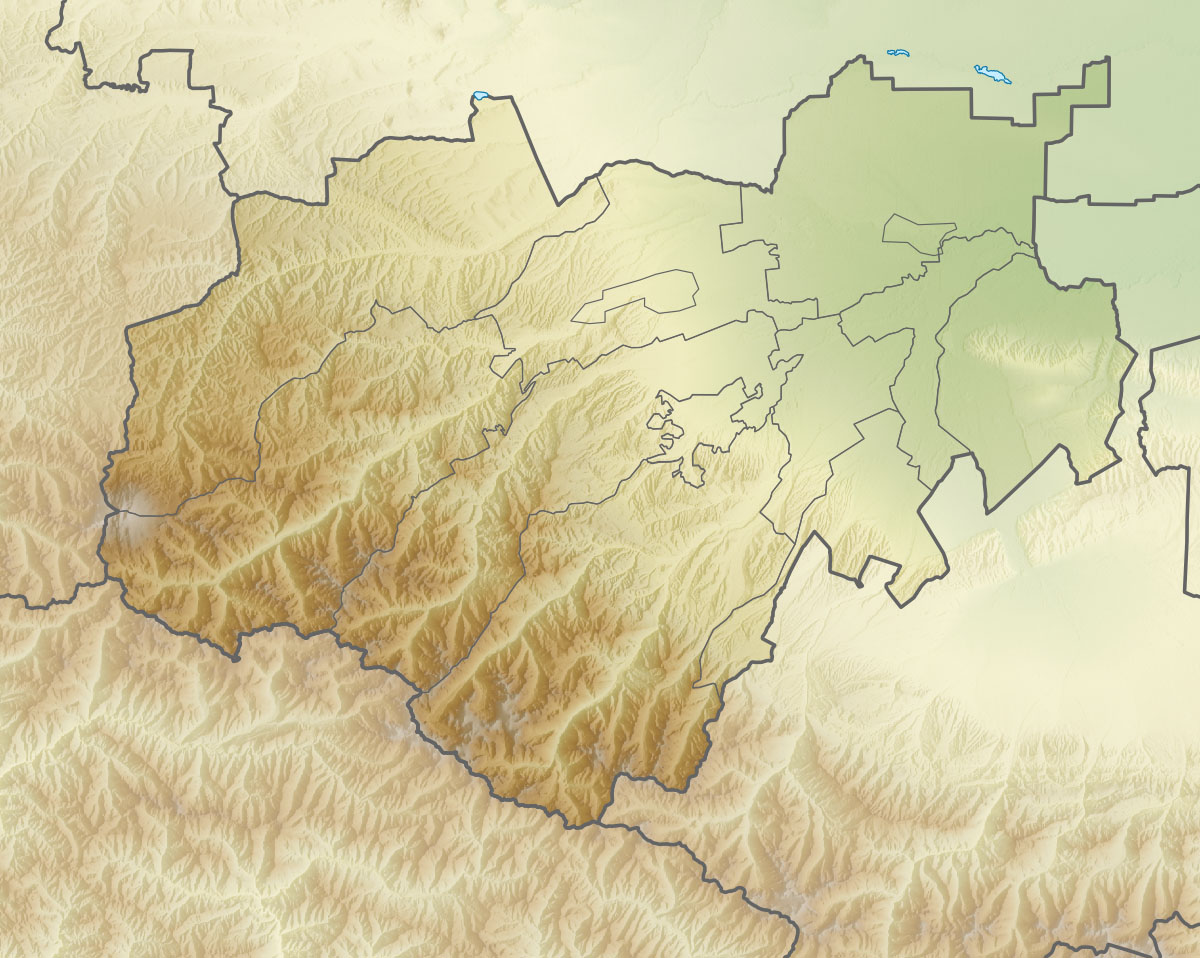
- Location within Caucasus Mountains Location within Kabardino-Balkaria Location within Samegrelo-Zemo Svaneti
- Countries: Georgia and Kabardino-Balkaria
- Parent range: Caucasus Mountains

Climbing
- First ascent: A. Lapetin, 1983

Shota Rustaveli (officially known as the Shota Rustaveli Peak) (Georgian: შოთა რუსთაველის მწვერვალი) is a mountain in the central part of the Greater Caucasus Mountain Range, straddling the border of Svaneti (Georgia) and Kabardino-Balkaria (Russia). The elevation of the mountain is 4,960 meters (16,270 feet). Shota Rustaveli is generally considered to be the 9th highest peak of the Caucasus. The slopes of the mountain are glaciated and some of the glaciers descend well into the adjacent valleys. Its name comes from famous Georgian poet Shota Rustaveli.
