= Katyn-Tau =

Summit in Greater Caucasus Mountain Range

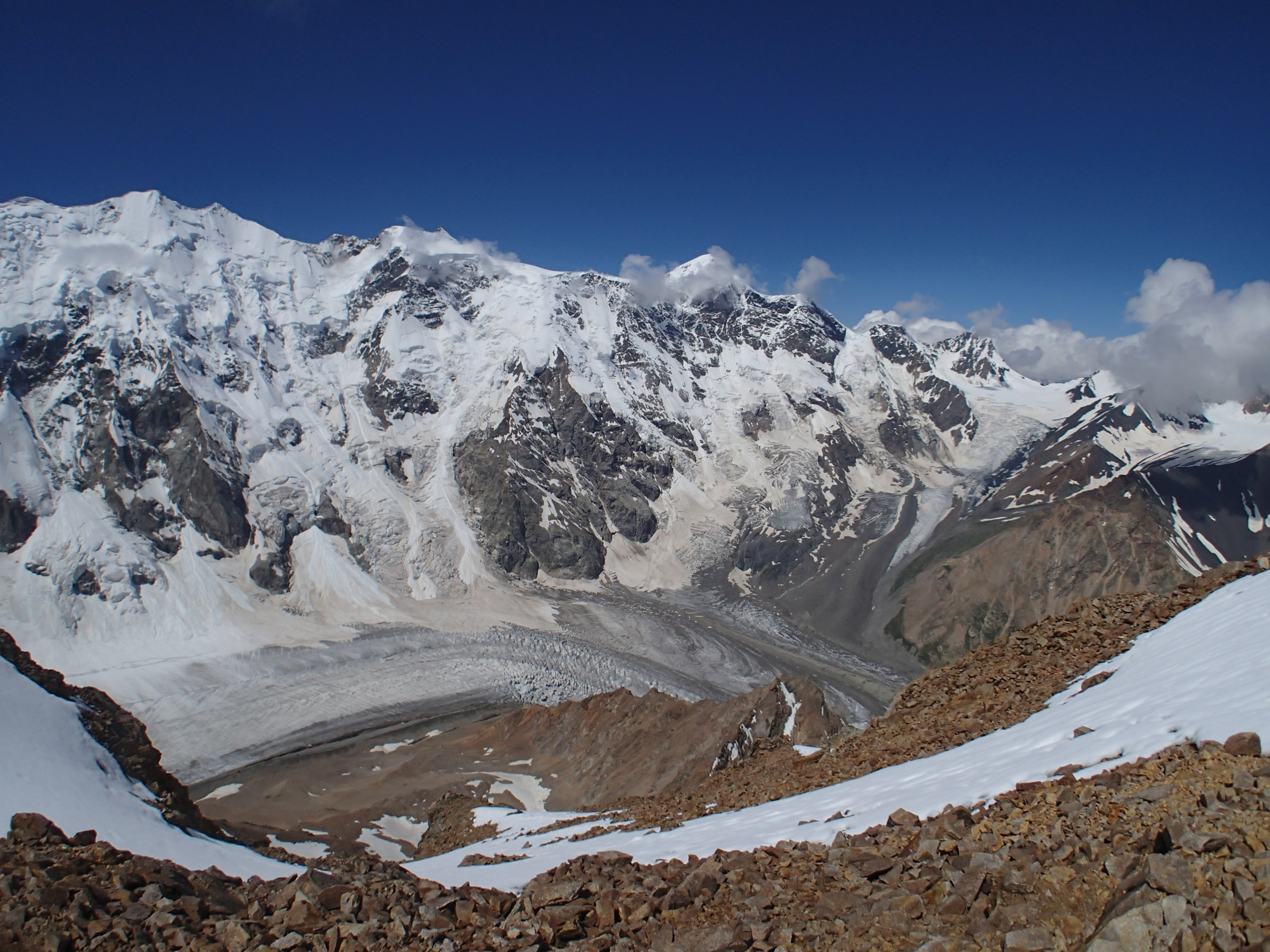

Highest point
- Elevation: 4,979 m (16,335 ft)
- Prominence: 159 m (522 ft)
- Isolation: 1.65 km (1.03 mi)
- Coordinates: 43°01′47″N 43°02′11″E

Geography
- Location within Georgia
- Location: Georgia / Russia
- Countries: Georgia and Kabardino-Balkaria
- Parent range: Main Caucasian Range; Caucasus Mountains

Katyn-Tau (Georgian: კათინთაუ; Russian: Катын-Тау) is a summit in the central part of the Greater Caucasus Mountain Range (Bezengi Wall). It lies on the border of Svaneti (Mestia Municipality, Georgia) and Kabardino-Balkaria (Russia). The elevation of the mountain is 4979 m (16,335 ft) above sea level. The mountain is made up of paleozoic granites. The slopes of summit are covered nival landscape.

The peak was first ascended in 1888 by a team led by Henry William Holder who summited August 24 via the famously difficult Bezingi Face.
