= Shkhara =

Highest peak in the Republic of Georgia

- შხარა Ушхара
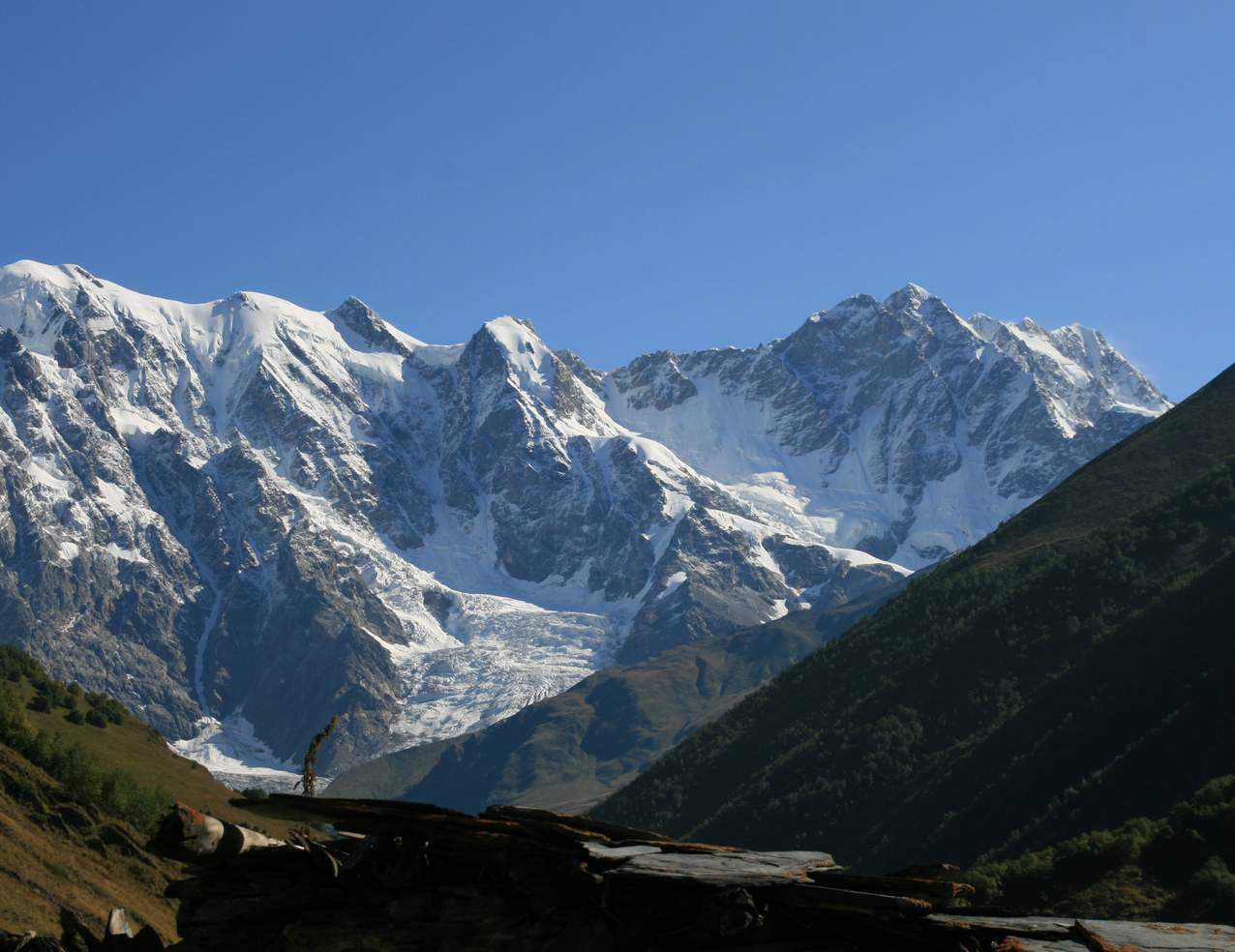

Highest point
- Elevation: 5,203 m (17,070 ft)
- Prominence: 1,357 m (4,452 ft)
- Listing: Seven Third Summits; Country high point
- Coordinates: 43°00′02″N 43°06′44″E

Geography
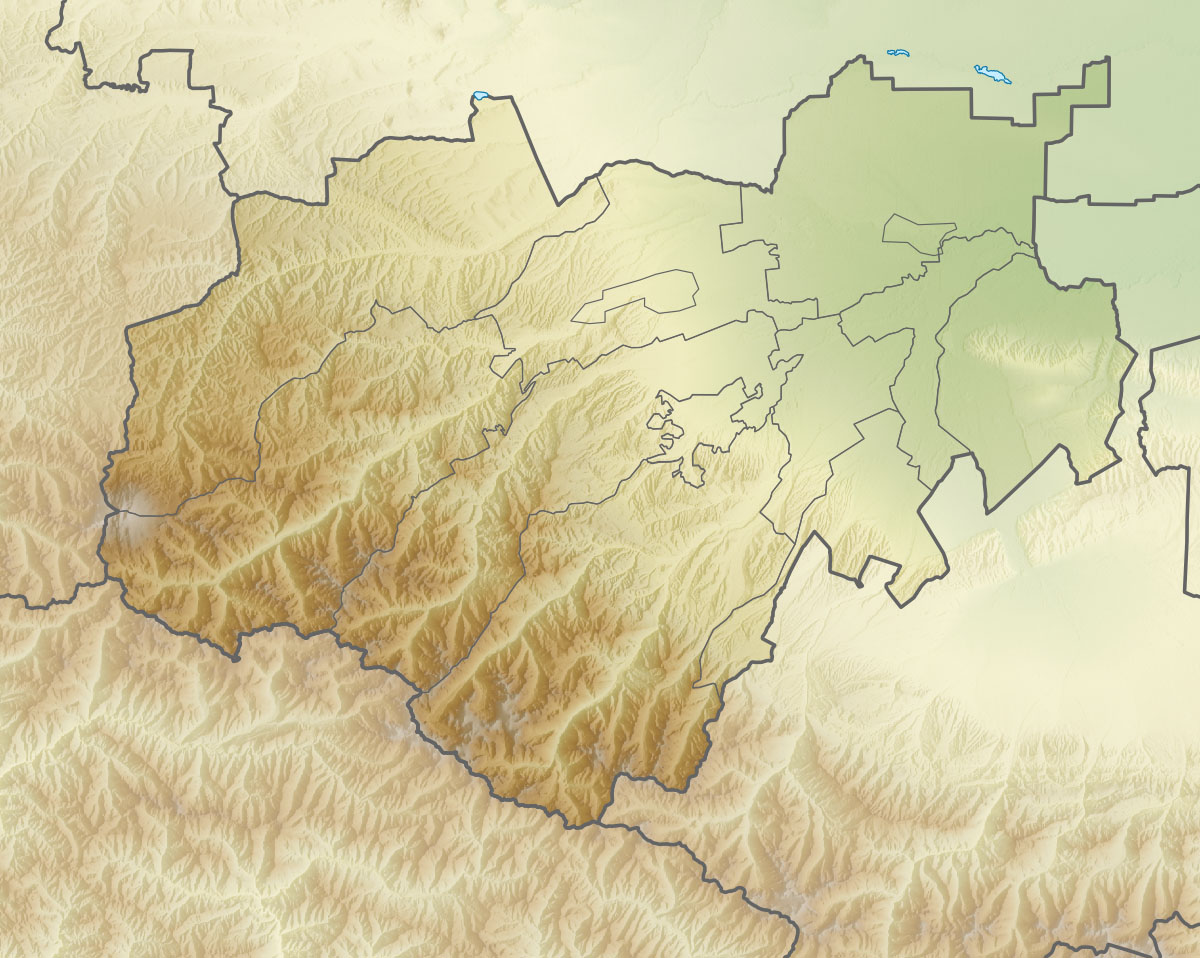
- Location within Caucasus Mountains Location within Kabardino-Balkaria Location within Samegrelo-Zemo Svaneti
- Location: Svaneti, Georgia; Kabardino-Balkaria, Russia
- Parent range: Main Caucasian Range; Greater Caucasus Mountains

Climbing
- First ascent: 1888 by U. Almer, J. Cockin and C. Roth
- Easiest route: Northeast Ridge: snow/ice climb (Russian grade 4b)

Shkhara (Georgian: შხარა; Karachay-Balkar: Ушхара, romanized: Uşxara; Russian: Шхара) is a mountain peak and the highest point in Georgia. It is located on the Georgia–Russia border, in Russia's Kabardino-Balkaria region on the northern side, and the Svaneti region of Georgia in the south. Shkhara is the highest peak of the Greater Caucasus Mountain Range since both Elbrus and Dykhtau are located along the side ranges, which lie to the north of it. Shkhara lies 88 kilometres (55 mi) north of Kutaisi, Georgia's third-largest city, and right at the townlet of Mestia. The summit lies in the central part of the Greater Caucasus Mountain Range, south-east of Mount Elbrus, Europe's highest mountain. Shkhara is the third-highest peak in the Caucasus, just behind Dykh-Tau.

== Morphology ==
Shkhara is the high point and the eastern anchor of a massif known as the Bezengi Wall, a 11–12-kilometre-long (6.8–7.5 mi) ridge. It is a large, steep peak in a heavily glaciated region, and presents serious challenges to mountaineers. Its north face (on the Russian side) is 1,500 metres (4,900 ft) high and contains several classic difficult routes. The significant sub-summit Shkhara West, at 5,068 m (16,627 ft), is a climbing objective in its own right, and a traverse of the entire Bezingi Wall is considered "Europe's longest, most arduous, and most committing expedition".

== Climbing History ==
The peak was first climbed in 1888 via the North East Ridge route, by the British/Swiss team of English climber John Garforth Cockin and Swiss guides Ulrich Almer and Christian Roth.

The first traverse of Shkhara's Bezengi Wall was completed on 28 August 1931 by Austrian mountaineers Poppinger, Moldan and Schintlmeister. It took seven days for them to complete.

The first ascent of the South Pillar, also known as the Benku-Kherigani route was completed in 1950 by a team of Georgian mountaineers led by Benku Kherigani.

The first winter ascent of The South Face of Shkhara was completed on 10 February 2018 by Georgian mountaineers Archil Badriashvili and Giogi Tepnadze. They completed the ascent over thirteen days in alpine style. They established a new route with difficulties graded at M5 and WI5.

A new 1,555m winter route, named 'Shkhara Reborn', on The South Face was completed on 28 February 2025 by Hungarian mountaineers David Kocsis and Marton Nagy. They reached 4,600m on the face however they did not continue all the way to the main summit. During the ascent an avalanche buried their tent but they escaped uninjured and completed the climb.

== See also ==
- List of mountains in Georgia
- List of elevation extremes by country
