= Janga (mountain) =

Mountain in Georgia and Russia

- Dzhangi-Tau or Jangi-Tau
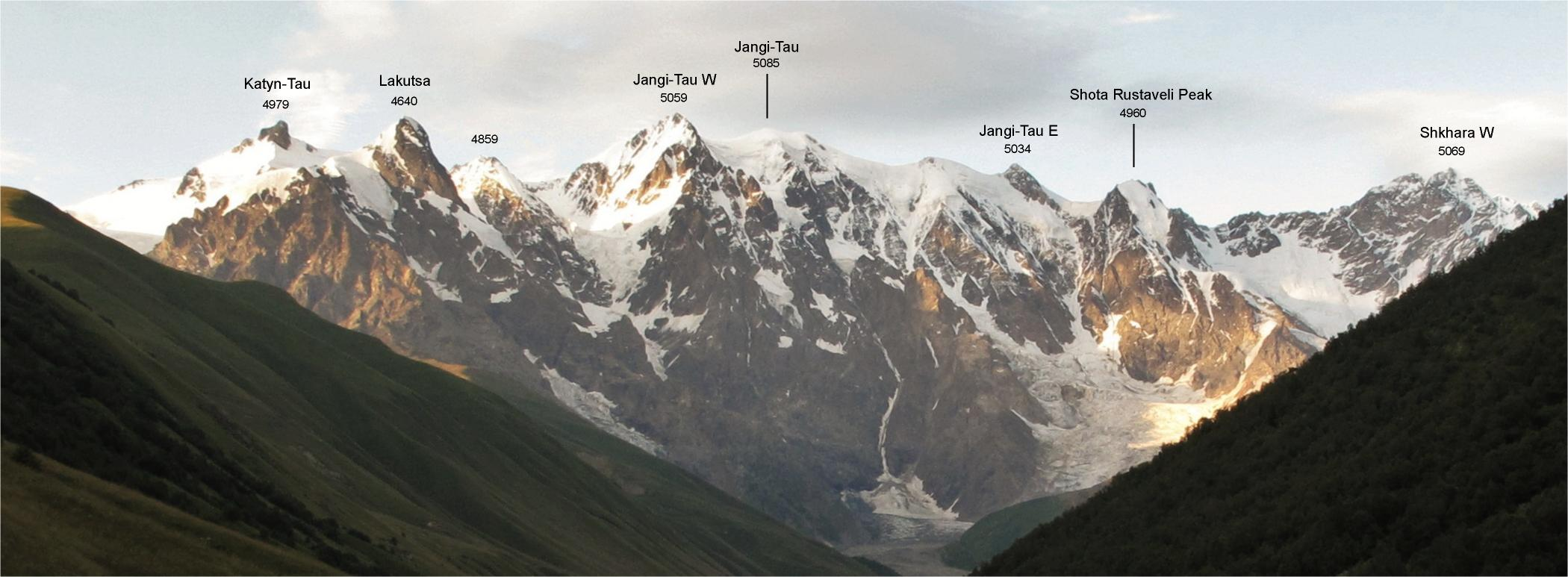
- Main Caucasus Ridge panorama between Katyn-Tau and Shkara peaks from georgian side. 2011

Highest point
- Elevation: 5,085 m (16,683 ft)
- Prominence: 335 m (1,099 ft)
- Isolation: 4.41 km (2.74 mi)
- Coordinates: 43°1′5″N 43°3′29″E

Naming
- Native name: Джангы тау (Karachay-Balkar); ჯანღა (Georgian)

Geography
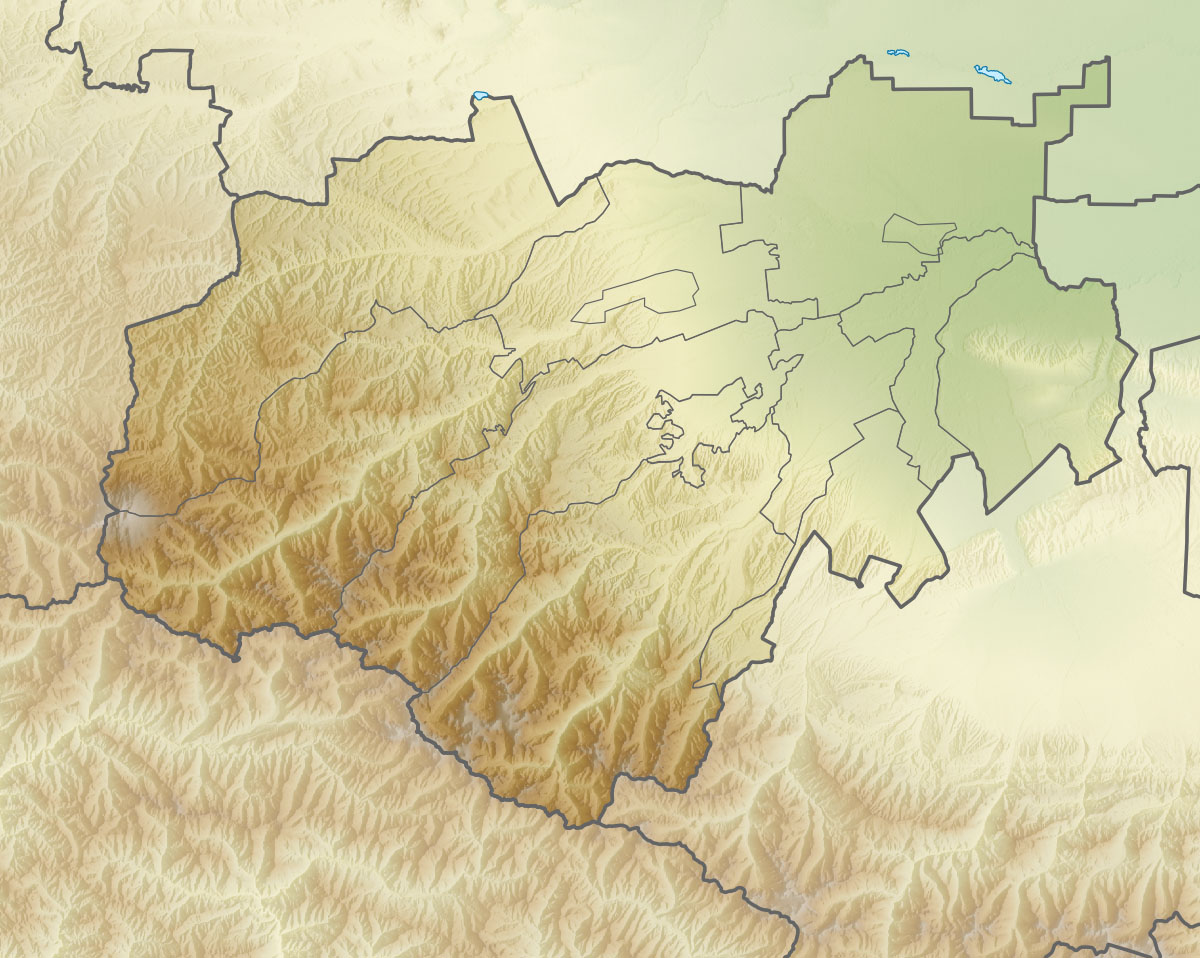
- Location within Caucasus Mountains Location within Kabardino-Balkaria Location within Samegrelo-Zemo Svaneti
- Location: Mestia, Georgia / Russia
- Countries: Russia and Georgia
- Parent range: Caucasus Mountains

Climbing
- First ascent: 1888

Janga (Georgian: ჯანღა [dʒanɣa]) or Jangi-Tau (Karachay-Balkar: Джангы тау, romanized: Cañı taw, lit. 'new mountain') or Dzhangi-Tau (Russian: Джанги-Тау, romanized: Džangi-Tau) is a summit in the central part of the Greater Caucasus Mountain Range. Mountain has three peaks - the main peak Jangi-Tau with elevation above sea level 5,085 m (16,683 ft), West Peak with elevation 5,059 m (16,598 ft) and East Peak with elevation 5,034 m (16,516 ft) Mountain lies on the border of Svaneti (Georgia) and Kabardino-Balkaria (Russia). The slopes of the mountain are heavily glaciated.

== History ==
On September 12, 1888, English climber John Garforth Cockin with Swiss guides Ulrich Almer and Christian Roth, were the first to climb East Janga, who had climbed the main ridge a few days earlier, and later - Ushba and Dykh-Tau. The most difficult, 5 B category (Russian Grading) route (south-western wall) was first traced by Georgian mountaineers (Grisha Gulbani - group leader Giorgi Berdzenishvili, Jokia Gugava, Sozar Gugava, Ilo Kavlashvili, Suliko Khabeishvili). The first ascent to the main Janga also belongs to foreign climbers.

On July 23, 1935, they climbed the peak of the north-eastern ridge (5 A category, Russian Grading ) to R. Schwarzgruber (group leader) v. Marini, f. Peringer et al. Thaler. Only one route passes through the Khalde Glacier. In 1965, Givi Kartvelishvili (group leader), Tamaz Bakanidze, Nugzar Bakradze, Besik Bakradze, Tengiz Berishvili and Dimitri Sharashenidze reached the peak of the main wall through the south wall of the USSR championship program. West Janga is the most inaccessible among the peaks of the array.

It cannot be taken from the north due to "frost and avalanche" danger. There are two routes from Khalde Glacier (1960 - Otar Khazaradze, 1964 - I. Reformatorski).
