= List of mountains of the Faroe Islands =

List of mountains of the Faroes

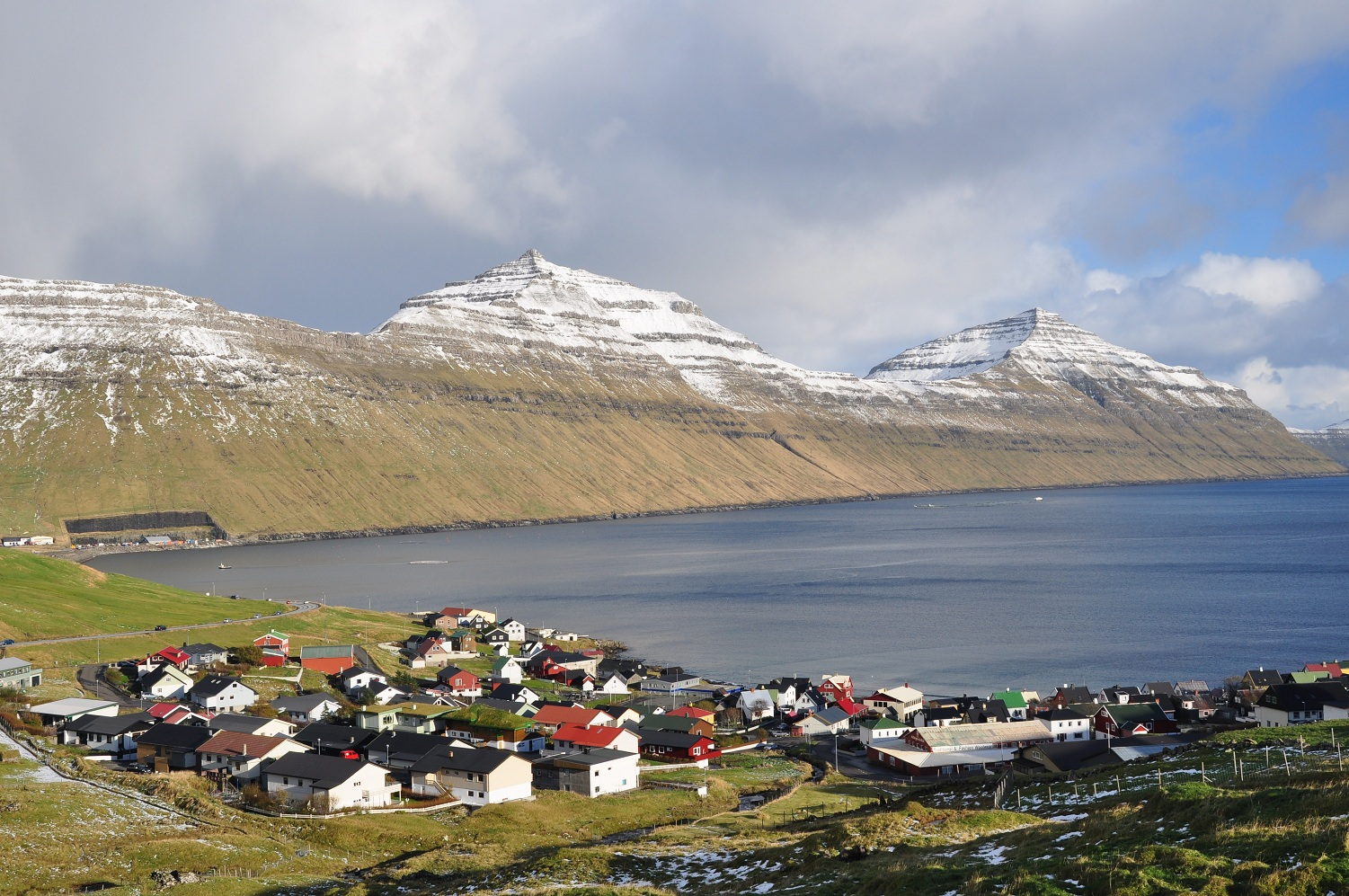
Syðrugøta with Sigatindur (612 m, centre) and Gøtunestindur (625 m, right) on Eysturoy

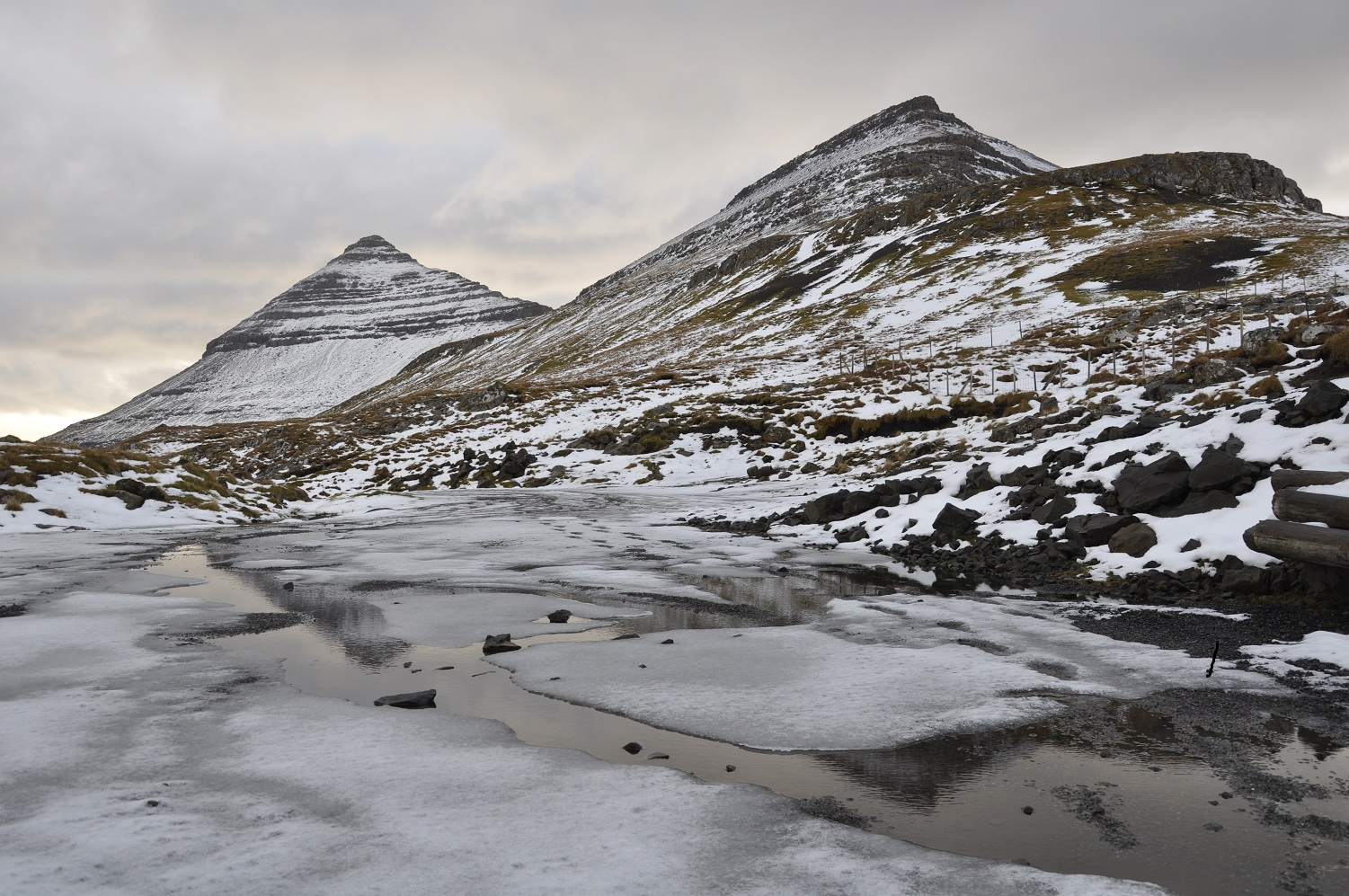
Háfjall (647 m) and Hálgafelli (503 m) on Borðoy

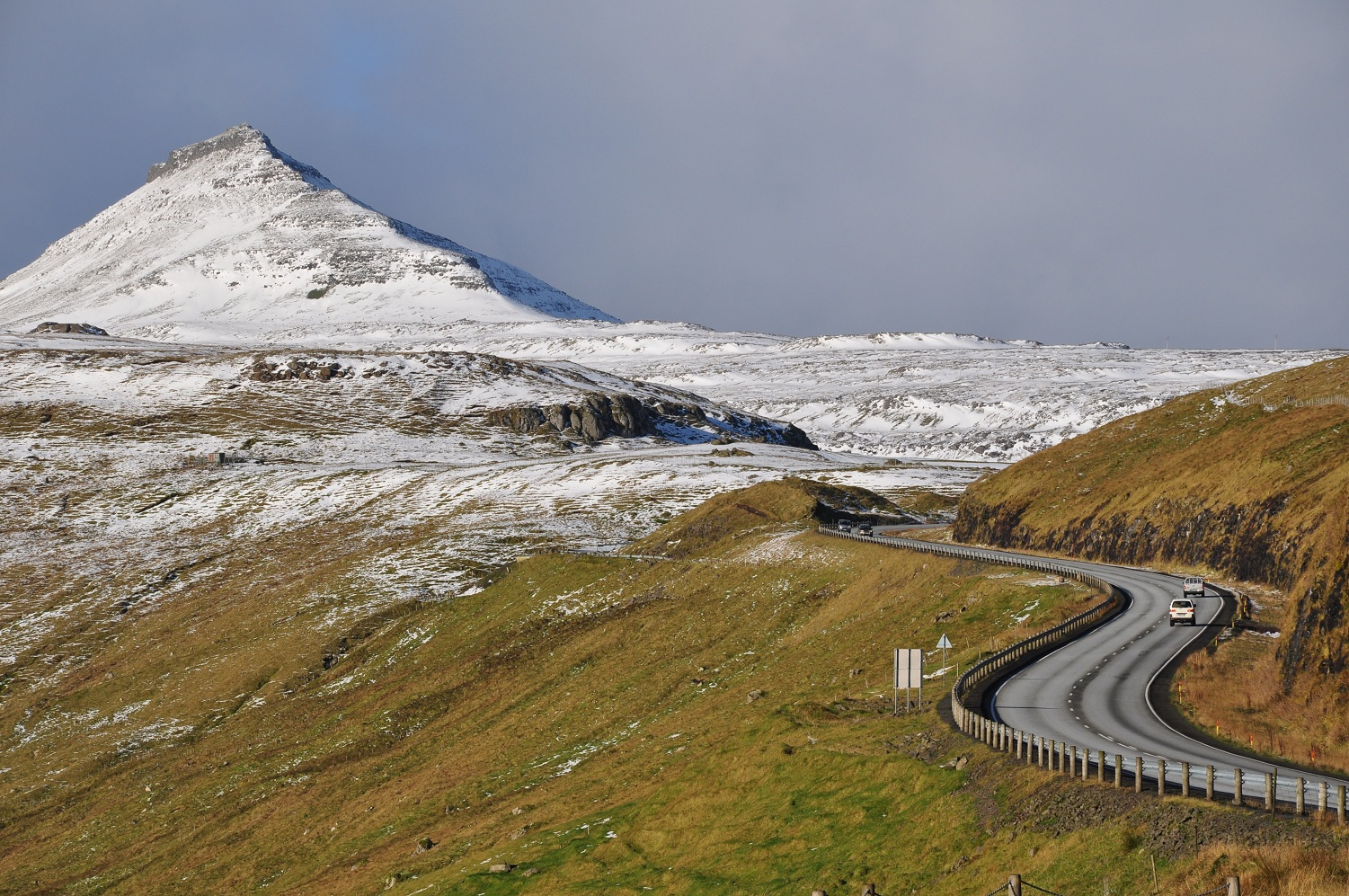
Tyril (639 m) on Eysturoy

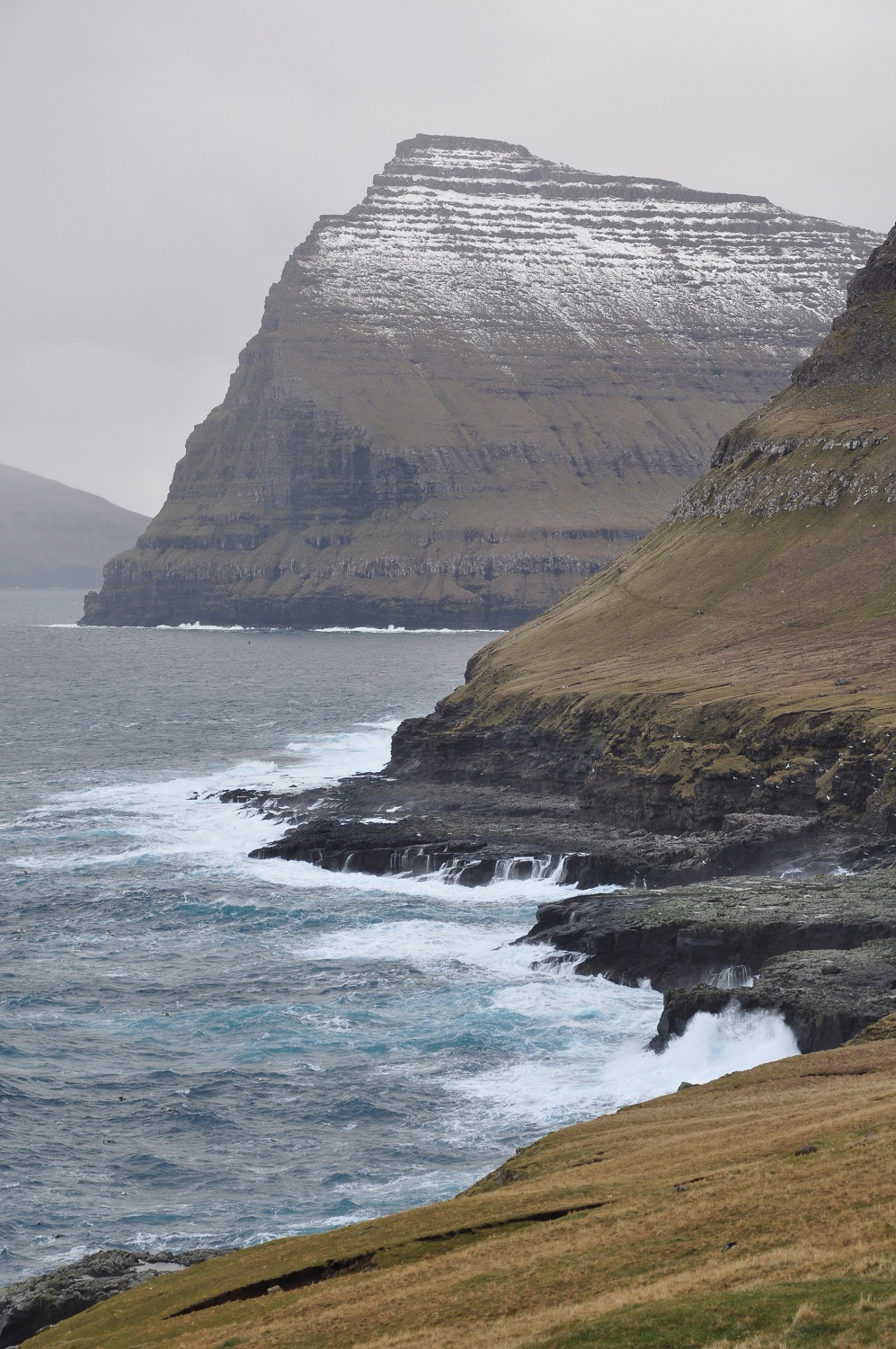
Talvborð (557 m) on Viðoy

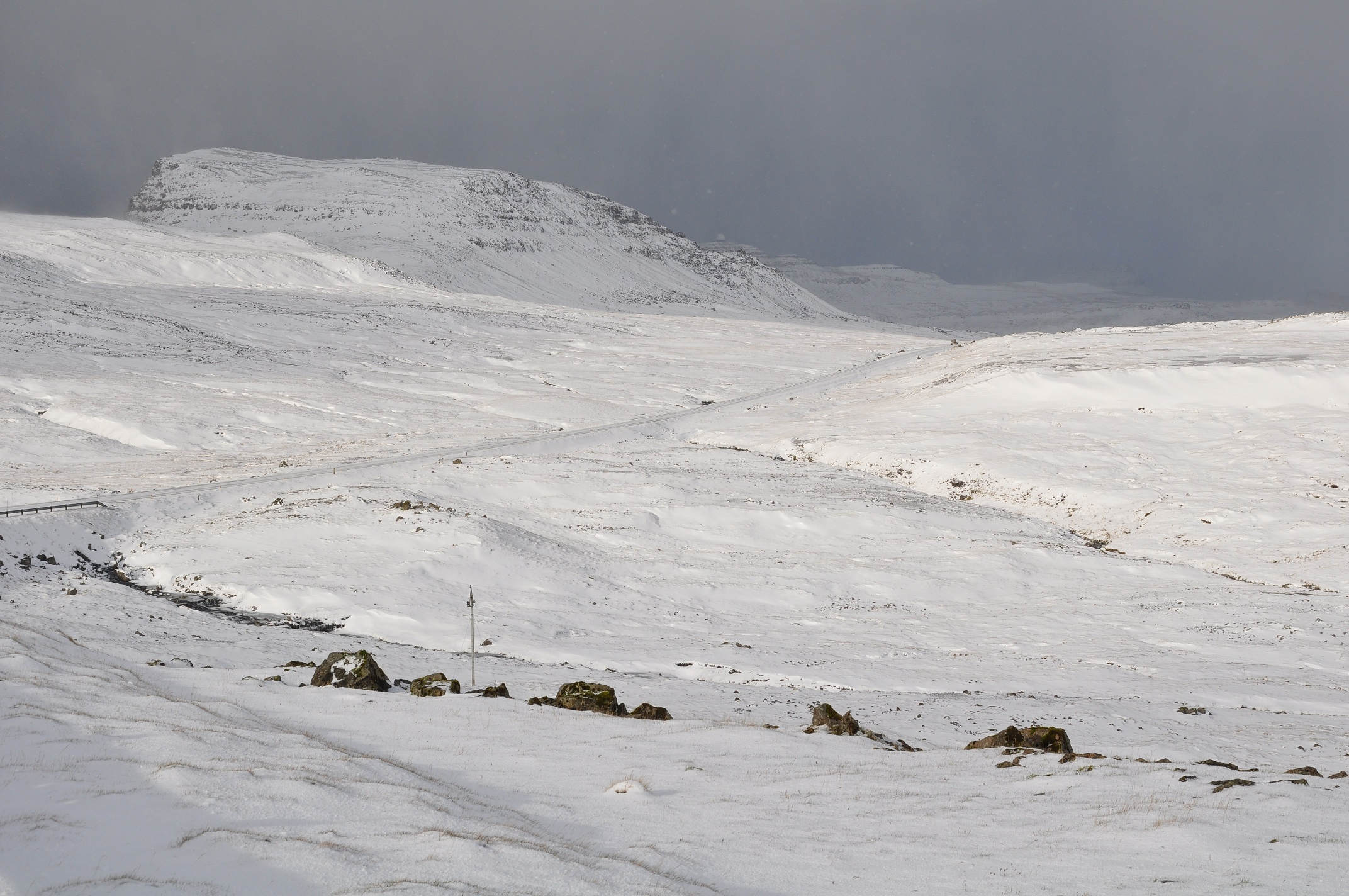
Stiðjafjall (547 m, at left) on Streymoy

The following is a list of mountains of the Faroes. Note, however, that several mountains have more than one peak. However, only the tallest peak is counted in this table.

Rank	Name	Island	Height (m)
1	Slættaratindur	Eysturoy	880
2	Gráfelli	Eysturoy	856
3	Villingadalsfjall	Viðoy	841
4	Kúvingafjall	Kunoy	830
5	Teigafjall	Kunoy	825
6	Kunoyarnakkur	Kunoy	819
7	Havnartindur	Kunoy	818
8	Urðafjall	Kunoy	817
9	Middagsfjall	Kunoy	805
10	Svartbakstindur	Eysturoy	801
11	Blámansfjall	Eysturoy	790
12	Kopsenni	Streymoy	789
13	Nestindar	Kalsoy	788
14	Múlatindur	Eysturoy	786
15	Ørvisfelli	Streymoy	783
16	Malaknúkur	Streymoy	777
17	Norðanfyri Lokkaskarð	Borðoy	772
18	Galvsskorafjall	Kunoy	768
19	Skælingsfjall	Streymoy	767
20	Reyðafelstindur	Eysturoy	764
21	Melin	Streymoy	764
22	Halgafelstindur	Eysturoy	757
23	Mosarøkur	Streymoy	756
24	Nakkurin (norðari)	Viðoy	754
25	Lokki	Borðoy	754
26	Sandfelli (Oyndarfjørður)	Eysturoy	754
27	Sandfelli (Gjógv)	Eysturoy	752
28	Norðanfyri Blámansfjall	Eysturoy	751
29	Malinsfjall	Viðoy	750
30	Sornfelli	Streymoy	749
31	Omanfyri Klivsdal	Borðoy	747
32	Sneis	Streymoy	747
33	Botnstindur	Kalsoy	744
34	Norðanfyri Kvíggjaskarð	Borðoy	739
35	Blábjørg	Eysturoy	732
36	Vaðhorn	Eysturoy	727
37	Árnafjall	Vágar	722
38	Dalkinsfjall	Eysturoy	719
39	Árnadalstindur	Streymoy	718
40	Eysturtindur	Vágar	715
41	Stígarnir	Streymoy	710
42	Suður á Nakki	Kunoy	703
43	Gomlumannatindur	Eysturoy	703
44	Víkartindur	Streymoy	703
45	Gívrufelli	Streymoy	701
46	Gríslatindur	Kalsoy	700
47	Hjarðardalstindur	Eysturoy	699
48	Knúkur (Oyri)	Eysturoy	699
49	Húsafjall	Eysturoy	695
50	Heyggjurin Mikli	Streymoy	692
51	Myrkjanoyrarfjall	Borðoy	689
52	Filthatturin	Viðoy	688
53	Oyggjarskoratindur	Viðoy	687
54	Skerðingur	Eysturoy	687
55	Fjallið millum Botnar	Streymoy	686
56	Malinstindur	Vágar	683
57	Depilsknúkur	Borðoy	681
58	Gjógvarafjall	Eysturoy	678
59	Jatnagarðar	Vágar	676
60	Reynsatindur	Vágar	676
61	Húgvan	Streymoy	674
62	Núgvan	Streymoy	667
63	Múlin	Streymoy	663
64	Lágafjall	Streymoy	663
65	Bøllufjall	Streymoy	658
66	Miðalfelli (Norðskáli)	Eysturoy	655
67	Enni	Viðoy	651
68	Eggjarmúli	Streymoy	651
69	Gívrufjall	Streymoy	649
70	Háfjall	Borðoy	648
71	Lokkafelli	Eysturoy	646
72	Snæfelli	Borðoy	644
73	Klubbin	Kunoy	644
74	Hattardalstindur	Kalsoy	644
75	Tosskorarhorn	Streymoy	644
76	Giliðtrítitindur	Vágar	643
77	Knúkur (Borðoy)	Borðoy	642
78	Krúnufjall	Borðoy	642
79	Borgin	Streymoy	642
80	Ritafjall	Eysturoy	641
81	Tyril (Gøta)	Eysturoy	639
82	Loysingafjall	Streymoy	639
83	Høvdin	Streymoy	635
84	Sneis	Viðoy	634
85	Vørlufjall	Streymoy	633
86	Knattarheyggjur	Vágar	630
87	Húsafelli	Eysturoy	626
88	Postulakirkja	Streymoy	626
89	Slætnatindur	Eysturoy	625
90	Gøtunestindur	Eysturoy	625
91	Moskursfjall	Streymoy	624
92	Snubburnar	Streymoy	623
93	Navirnar	Streymoy	622
94	Klubbin	Fugloy	621
95	Landsuðursfjall	Borðoy	621
96	Sátan	Streymoy	621
97	Egilsfjall	Streymoy	618
98	Snældansfjall	Vágar	617
99	Bollin	Streymoy	616
100	Manssetur	Eysturoy	615
101	Stallur	Streymoy	614
102	Pætursfjall	Streymoy	613
103	Sigatindur	Eysturoy	612
104	Heinanøva	Vágar	612
105	Kambur (Strendur)	Eysturoy	611
106	Gluggarnir	Suðuroy	610
107	Toftaknúkur	Borðoy	607
108	Gásafjall	Kalsoy	606
109	Vitin	Streymoy	605
110	eystanfyri Herðablaðið	Suðuroy	605
111	Middagsfjall	Eysturoy	601
112	LangafjalI	Streymoy	599
113	MiðalfelIi	Streymoy	596
114	Jógvansfjall	Vágar	595
115	Breiðistíggjur	Vágar	594
116	Tunnafjall	Viðoy	593
117	Miðfjall	Borðoy	593
118	Mjóstíggjur	Suðuroy	592
119	Fýramarkaknúkur	Borðoy	591
120	Heimarafjall	Kalsoy	591
121	Horn	Eysturoy	591
122	Tungufelli	Vágar	591
123	Húsafelli	Vágar	591
124	Knúkurin (Saksun)	Streymoy	589
125	Kaldbakskambur	Streymoy	588
126	Havnartindur	Svínoy	586
127	BølIufjalI	Streymoy	584
128	Miðardalstindur	Kalsoy	579
129	Tindur	Streymoy	579
130	Hádegisfjall	Kalsoy	576
131	Krosstindur	Vágar	574
132	Borgarknappur	Suðuroy	574
133	Sandfelli (Oyri)	Eysturoy	572
134	FjalIið Litla	Streymoy	572
135	Gásafelli	Vágar	572
136	Heldarstindur	Vágar	572
137	Borgin	Eysturoy	571
138	Borgin (Vágur)	Suðuroy	570
139	Galvurin	Suðuroy	569
140	Stórafjall	Eysturoy	567
141	Mýlingur	Streymoy	564
142	Hæddin	Borðoy	563
143	Jatnagarðar	Vágar	563
144	Lítlafelli	Eysturoy	562
145	Knúkur (Mykines)	Mykines	560
146	Hvannafelli	Suðuroy	560
147	Talvborð	Viðoy	557
148	Slættafelli	Eysturoy	553
149	Klubbin	Kalsoy	551
150	StiðjafjalI	Streymoy	547
151	Nakkur (Trungisvágur)	Suðuroy	547
152	Kambur (Fuglafjørður)	Eysturoy	545
153	Krossafelli	Vágar	545
154	Borgarfelli	Eysturoy	543
155	Borgarin	Kalsoy	537
156	SandfelIi	Streymoy	537
157	Tindur	Borðoy	535
158	Tyril (Gjógv)	Eysturoy	535
159	TungulíðfjalI	Streymoy	535
160	Glopprókin	Suðuroy	535
161	Búrhella	Borðoy	534
162	Skoratindur	Eysturoy	529
163	Høgøksl	Suðuroy	525
164	Nøv	Kalsoy	524
165	Berinartindur	Vágar	524
166	Klórarin	Eysturoy	523
167	Grímstaðfjall	Vágar	523
168	Tólvmarkaknúkur	Borðoy	519
169	Støðlafjall	Eysturoy	517
170	Høgafjall	Vágar	515
171	Vatnsdalsfjall	Vágar	514
172	Tindur (Trungisvágur)	Suðuroy	514
173	Róvin	Eysturoy	513
174	Mølin	Viðoy	511
175	Miðafelli (Søldarfjørður)	Eysturoy	505
176	Tindur	Eysturoy	503
177	Hálgafelli	Borðoy	502
178	Høvdin uttanfyri Eyrgjógv	Vágar	502
179	Slættafjall	Kalsoy	500
180	RitufelIi	Streymoy	499
181	Lambaregn	Eysturoy	495
182	Tempulsklettur	Suðuroy	493
183	KonufelIi	Streymoy	491
184	Bustin (Froðba)	Suðuroy	487
185	Laðanfelli	Suðuroy	487
186	Knavin	Vágar	485
187	Altarið	Eysturoy	483
188	Fjallið (Strendur)	Eysturoy	483
189	Kambur (Froðba)	Suðuroy	483
190	Vágfelli	Suðuroy	483
191	Mjóstíggjur	Eysturoy	482
192	Nakkurin	Viðoy	481
193	DylIan	Streymoy	481
194	Murufelli	Streymoy	479
195	Tindur	Sandoy	479
196	GásafelIi	Streymoy	477
197	Uppi á Oyggj	Koltur	477
198	Lítlafjall	Kunoy	471
199	Prestfjall	Suðuroy	471
200	HægstafjalI	Streymoy	470
201	Beinisvørð	Suðuroy	470
202	Fjallið (Gjógv)	Eysturoy	469
203	Fjallið Mikla	Suðuroy	469
204	Rógvukollur	Vágar	464
205	Keldufjall	Svínoy	463
206	Knúkur (vestari)	Svínoy	463
207	Knúkur (Leirvík)	Eysturoy	463
208	Spáafelli	Suðuroy	462
209	Gásafelli	Borðoy	461
210	Knúkur (Svínoy)	Svínoy	460
211	Skorarnar	Sandoy	460
212	Skálafjall	Eysturoy	459
213	Bolafløttur	Vágar	458
214	Rossafelli	Streymoy	453
215	Endin (Trøðum)	Sandoy	452
216	Eystfelli	Fugloy	449
217	Eindalsfjall	Vágar	449
218	Pætursfjall	Sandoy	447
219	Klettur	Kunoy	444
220	Múlin	Svínoy	443
221	Tungufellið Lítla	Vágar	443
222	Oyrnafjall	Suðuroy	443
223	Høguskorar	Suðuroy	440
224	Byttufelli	Kalsoy	439
225	Spinarnir	Suðuroy	439
226	Heðinsskorarfjall	Mykines	433
227	Rávan (Vágur)	Suðuroy	432
228	Vatnfelli	Streymoy	429
229	Borgin (Sandvík)	Suðuroy	429
230	Nónfjall	Suðuroy	427
231	Ytriheyggjur	Streymoy	425
232	Enni	Suðuroy	424
233	Mølin	Vágar	423
234	Middagur	Svínoy	422
235	Oyndfjarðarfjall	Eysturoy	421
236	Múlin	Hestur	421
237	Eggjarrók	Hestur	421
238	Fjallið (Velbastað)	Streymoy	417
239	Kolheyggjurin	Suðuroy	415
240	Rávan	Lítla Dímun	414
241	Klakkur	Borðoy	413
242	Eiriksfjall	Sandoy	412
243	Endin	Sandoy	410
244	Heimariheyggjur	Streymoy	409
245	Kneysurin	Sandoy	404
246	Túgvan i Halgafelli	Suðuroy	400
247	Gásafelli (Haldarsvík)	Streymoy	399
248	Vestfelli	Sandoy	397
249	Stórafjall	Sandoy	396
250	Høgoyggj	Stóra Dímun	396
251	Borðyarnes	Borðoy	392
252	Antinisfjall	Vágar	392
253	Knútur	Skúvoy	392
254	Skorin	Skúvoy	391
255	Rossaklettur	Suðuroy	389
256	ÁrndalsfjalI	Streymoy	382
257	Tindurin (Sumba)	Suðuroy	379
258	Ritubergsnøva	Vágar	376
259	Skálafjall	Suðuroy	374
260	Vørðan	Sandoy	373
261	Eggjarklettur	Nólsoy	372
262	Eggin	Suðuroy	372
263	Knúkur (Sandoy)	Sandoy	369
264	Nónfjall	Vágar	367
265	Lambafelli	Streymoy	366
266	Glývrabergsnasi	Suðuroy	366
267	Fjallið	Sandoy	362
268	Siglifelli	Suðuroy	359
269	Rútafelli	Suðuroy	356
270	Skúvoyarfjall	Sandoy	354
271	Bustin (Sandvík)	Suðuroy	353
272	Eiðiskollur	Eysturoy	352
273	Uppi á Manni	Nólsoy	352
274	Klubbin	Vágar	352
275	Kirkjubøreyn	Streymoy	351
276	Lírisfelli	Vágar	351
277	Árnafjall	Mykines	350
278	Fjallið (Sandvík)	Suðuroy	350
279	Reynið	Streymoy	349
280	Kaguklettur	Suðuroy	347
281	Lómfelli	Streymoy	345
282	Húsareyn	Streymoy	345
283	Gjógvaráfjall	Suðuroy	345
284	Eysturhøvdið	Svínoy	344
285	Middagsfjall	Vágar	343
286	Kjølur	Borðoy	342
287	Nakkar (Sandvík)	Suðuroy	330
288	Knúkin	Suðuroy	329
289	Grímsfjall	Suðuroy	327
290	Nakkur (Froðba)	Suðuroy	325
291	Hólmsskorafjall	Suðuroy	322
292	Uttarafjall	Suðuroy	320
293	Bøllufjall	Sandoy	312
294	Á Kletti	Stóra Dímun	308
295	Kirkjubøkambur	Streymoy	306
296	Suður á FjaIli	Vágar	305
297	Glyvrafjall	Eysturoy	303
298	Tindur (Vágur)	Suðuroy	298
299	HægstafjalI	Streymoy	296
300	Melin	Streymoy	293
301	Húgvan	Stóra Dímun	288
302	Sundsnøva	Vágar	286
303	Skálin	Suðuroy	286
304	Skornasaklettur	Suðuroy	286
305	Eystarafjall	Suðuroy	285
306	Vørufelli	Vágar	284
307	Hæddin	Eysturoy	274
308	Tvørfelli	Streymoy	273
309	Gleðin	Sandoy	271
310	Ravnsfjall	Vágar	269
311	Heiðafjall	Sandoy	266
312	Høgaleiti	Eysturoy	264
313	Kvívíksskoranøva	Vágar	263
314	Fjallið (Trungisvágur)	Suðuroy	259
315	Klettarnir	Skúvoy	256
316	Nakkurin	Sandoy	251
317	Vørðan	Suðuroy	237
318	Kirvi	Suðuroy	236
319	Lambaklettur	Suðuroy	235
320	Skúvafjall	Nólsoy	234
321	Gásafelli	Eysturoy	231
322	Fjallið (Tórshavn)	Streymoy	222
323	Navirnar	Hestur	211
324	Kambur (Porkeri)	Suðuroy	206
325	Skálhøvdi	Sandoy	203
326	LítlafjalI	Streymoy	198
327	Fjallið (Haldarsvík)	Streymoy	188
328	Norðarafjall	Eysturoy	172
329	Sunnarafjall	Eysturoy	171
330	Vørðan	Eysturoy	169
331	Vatnfelli	Eysturoy	165
332	Líðarfjall	Nólsoy	152
333	Trælanípa	Vágar	142
334	Salthøvdi	Sandoy	139
335	Høvdin	Skúvoy	134
336	Eystnes	Eysturoy	130
337	Húkslond	Eysturoy	129
338	Brigðufelli	Eysturoy	122
339	Høganes	Eysturoy	115
