= Húsareyn =

Mountain located on the island of Streymoy

- Location within Denmark Faroe Islands

Highest point
- Elevation: 345 m (1,132 ft)
- Coordinates: 62°01′00.006″N 6°49′00.02″W

Geography
- Location: Streymoy, Faroe Islands

Húsareyn is a mountain located on the island of Streymoy, Faroe Islands. Standing at 345 metres (1,132 ft) above sea level, it is dwarfed by other Faroese mountains such as Slættaratindur.

The mountain overlooks the Faroese capital, Tórshavn, from the northwest and is clearly visible around the town. It is a popular hiking destination for tourists because of its easy accessibility from the capital.
