= Kunoy (village) =

Kunoy Kunø (Danish)
- Municipality and village
- Kunoy Municipality; Kunoyar kommuna (Faroese)
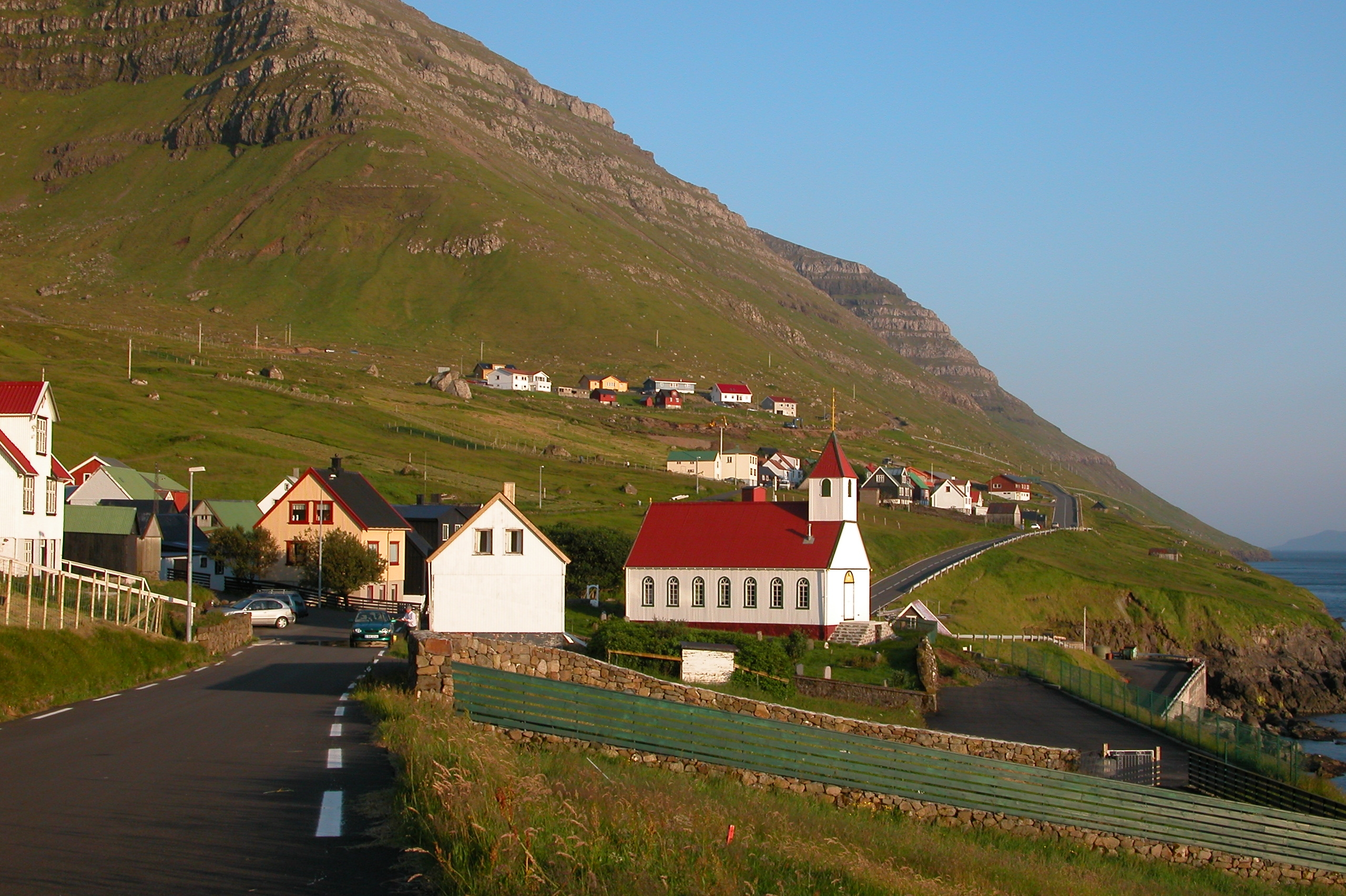

- Location in the Faroe Islands
- Coordinates: 62°17′37″N 6°40′2″W
- State: Kingdom of Denmark
- Constituent country: Faroe Islands
- Island: Kunoy

Population (September 2025)
  - Total: 82
- Time zone: GMT
  - Summer (DST): UTC+1 (EST)
- Postal code: FO 780
- Climate: Cfc
- Website: http://kunoy.fo/

Kunoy (Danish: Kunø) is a village and municipality in the Faroe Islands.

The village itself is located on the western shores of the island of Kunoy, which the town is named after. However, Kunoy is not the only town on the island; Haraldssund, on the east shore of the island, is the only other settlement on the island. In the 2018 census, both Haraldssund and Kunoy had the same number of inhabitants.

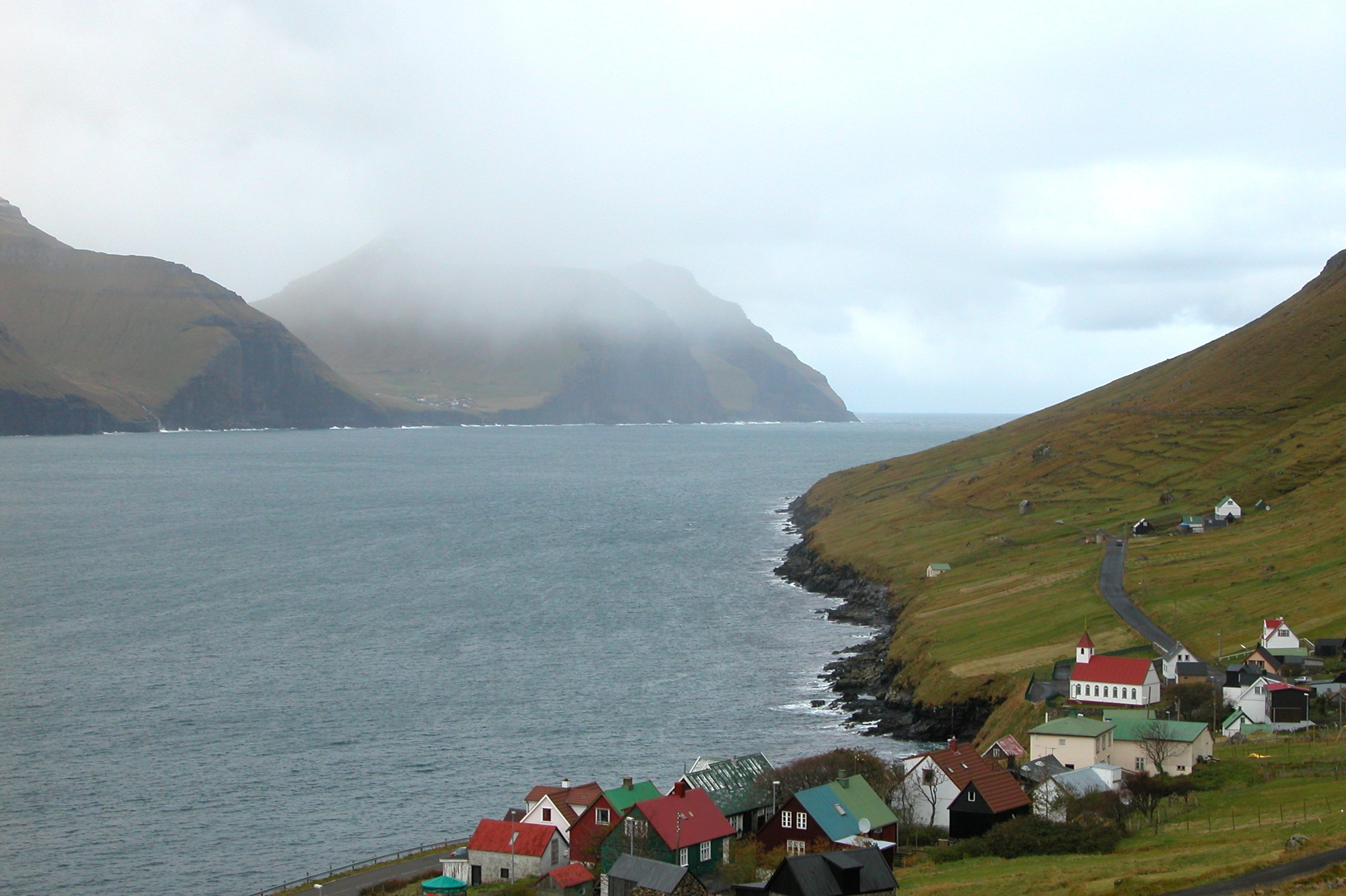

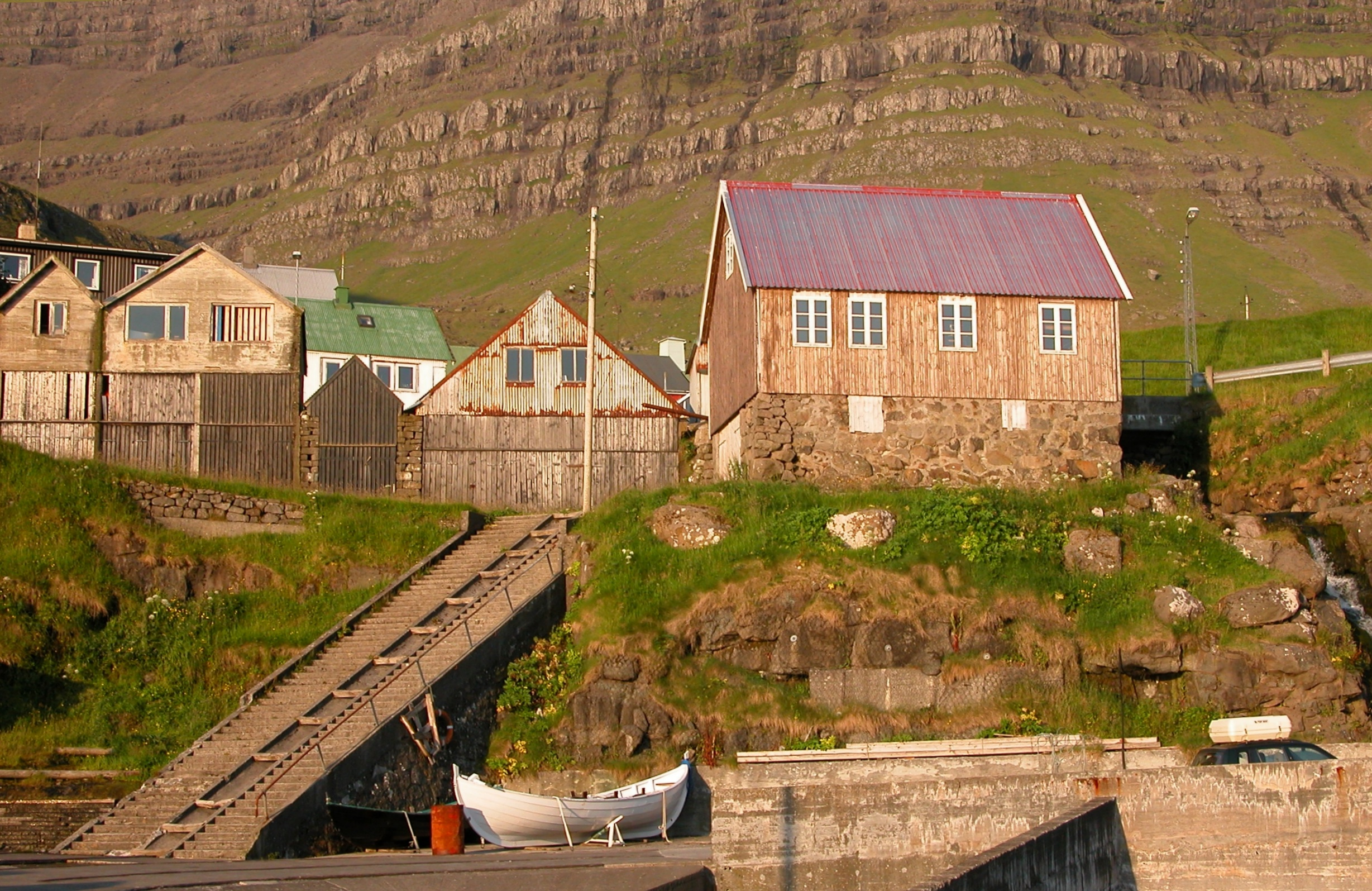
