= Heyggjurin Mikli =

Mountain in Faroe Islands

Coordinates: 61°45′0″N 6°49′0″W

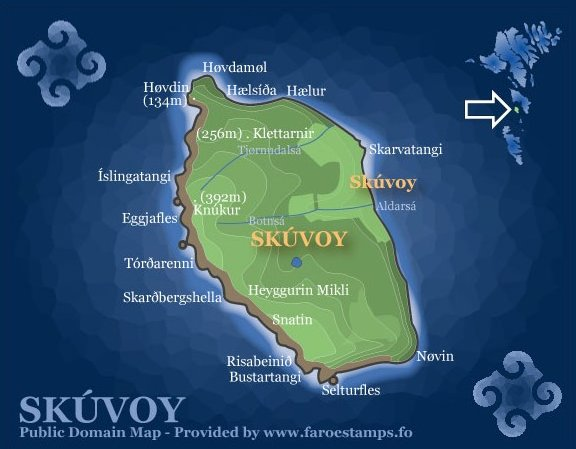

Heyggjurin Mikli is marginally the second highest point of Skuvoy in the central Faroe Islands. At a height of 391 metres the area is hilly. Knukur the highest mountain on the isle is only 1 m higher at its highest point of 392 metres.
