= Funningur =

- Village
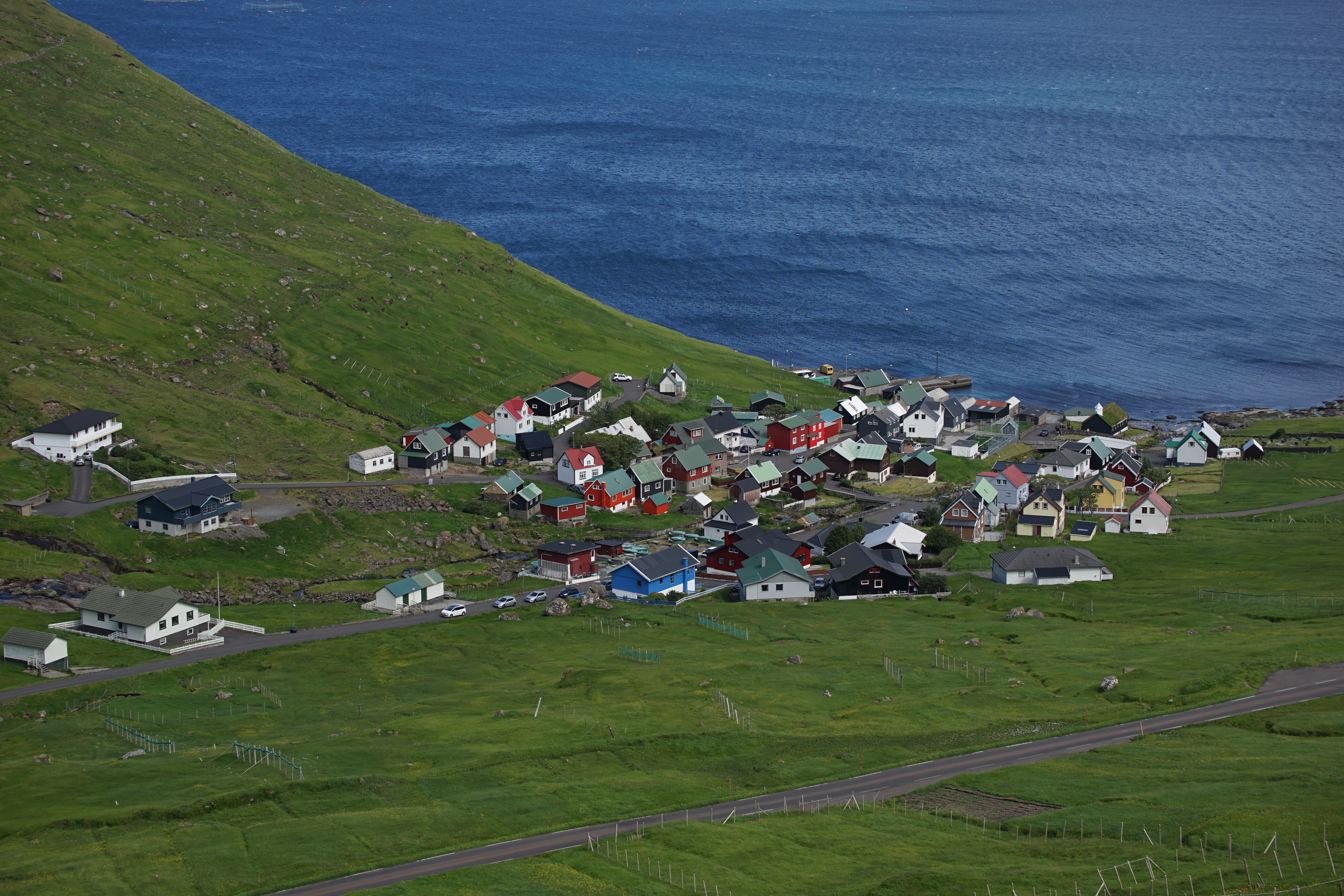
- Funningur

- Location in the Faroe Islands
- Coordinates: 62°17′17″N 6°58′2″W
- State: Kingdom of Denmark
- Constituent country: Faroe Islands
- Island: Eysturoy
- Municipality: Runavíkar kommuna
- Established: 9th century

Area
  - Total: 7.1 sq mi (18.3 km^{2})
- Elevation: 0 ft (0 m)

Population (September 2025)
  - Total: 42
- Time zone: GMT
  - Summer (DST): UTC+1 (EST)
- Postal code: FO 475
- Climate: ET

Funningur is a village on the Faroe Islands. It is located on the northwest coast of Eysturoy (62°17′17″N 6°58′2″W). It was the only village in the municipality called Funnings kommuna, which on 1 January 2009 became part of Runavíkar kommuna.

To the west of the village rises the highest mountain in the Faroe Islands, Slættaratindur (880m), however, the summit itself is not visible from the village.

== History ==
Tradition says that the first viking who settled on the Faroe Islands, Grímur Kamban, settled in Funningur. He was a Norwegian Viking escaping the tyranny of the Norse king Haraldur Hárfagri. However, this is an error in the saga, because Harald's reign was in the late 9th century, while the first Norse settlers reached the Faroes after 825. (Actually, Irish monks arrived much earlier ca. 625–650).

== Population ==
About 70 people live in Funningur on both sides of a cascading stream in a compact cluster of houses around a small bay. The wooden turf-roofed church in Funningur dates from 1847 and stands at the water's edge.

Mountains surrounding the village (counter-clockwise from the north):

- Middagsfjall (601m) (due north)
- Gráfelli (856m)
- Slættaratindur (882m) (due west)
- Vaðhorn (780m)
- Blámansfjall (792m) with outcropping Nón (504m)
- Húsafjall (697m) (due south)

== Gallery ==
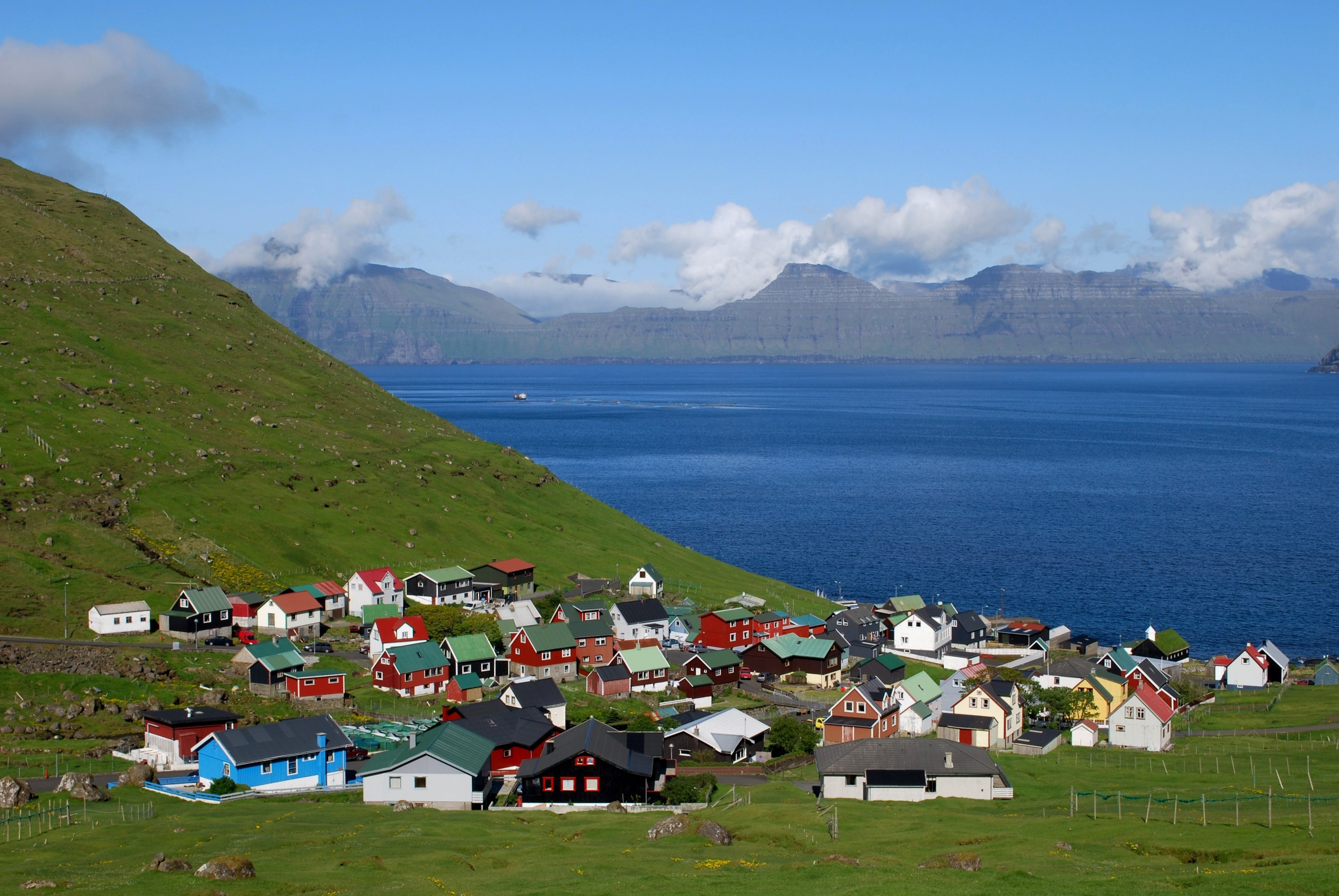
Funningur

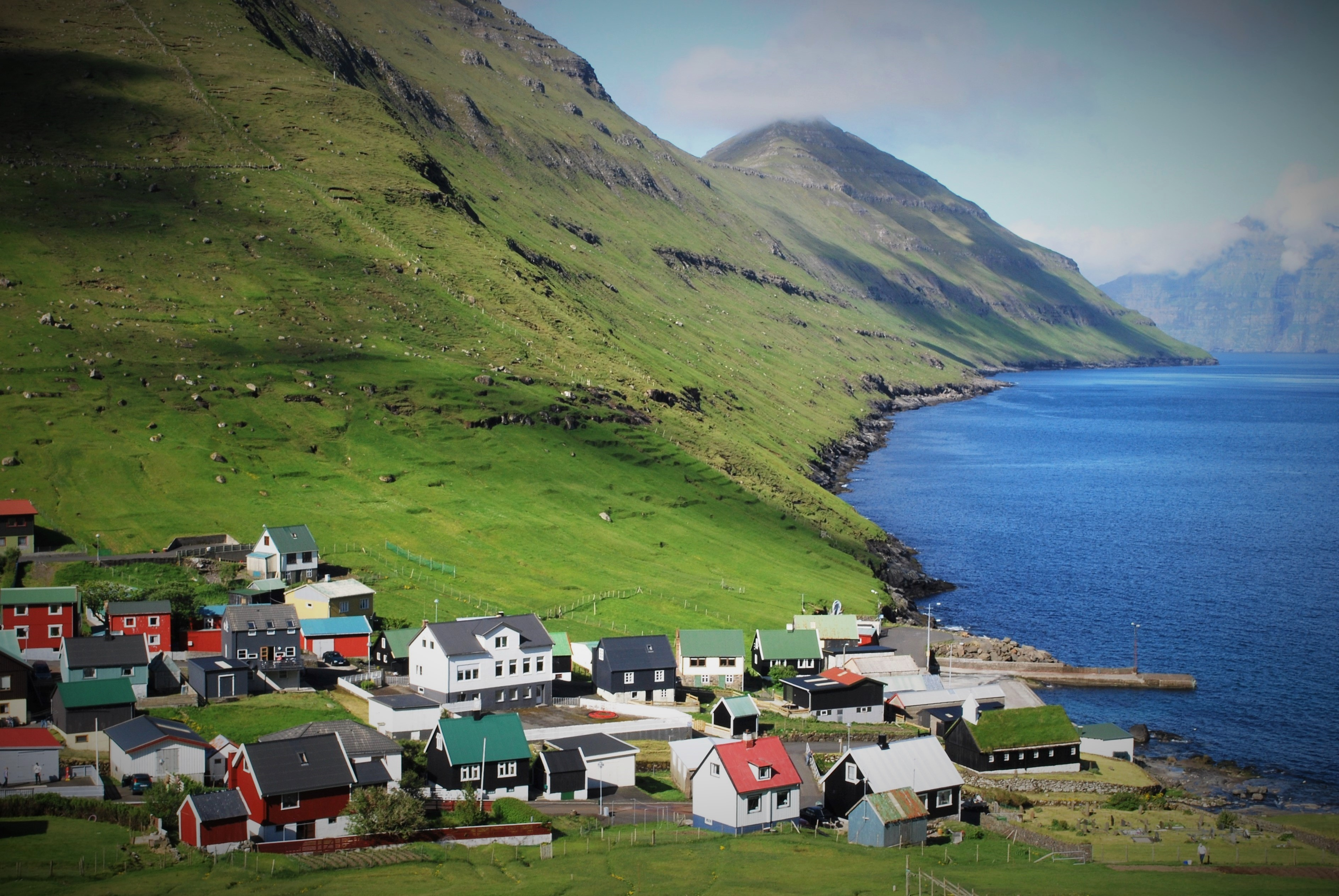
Funningur

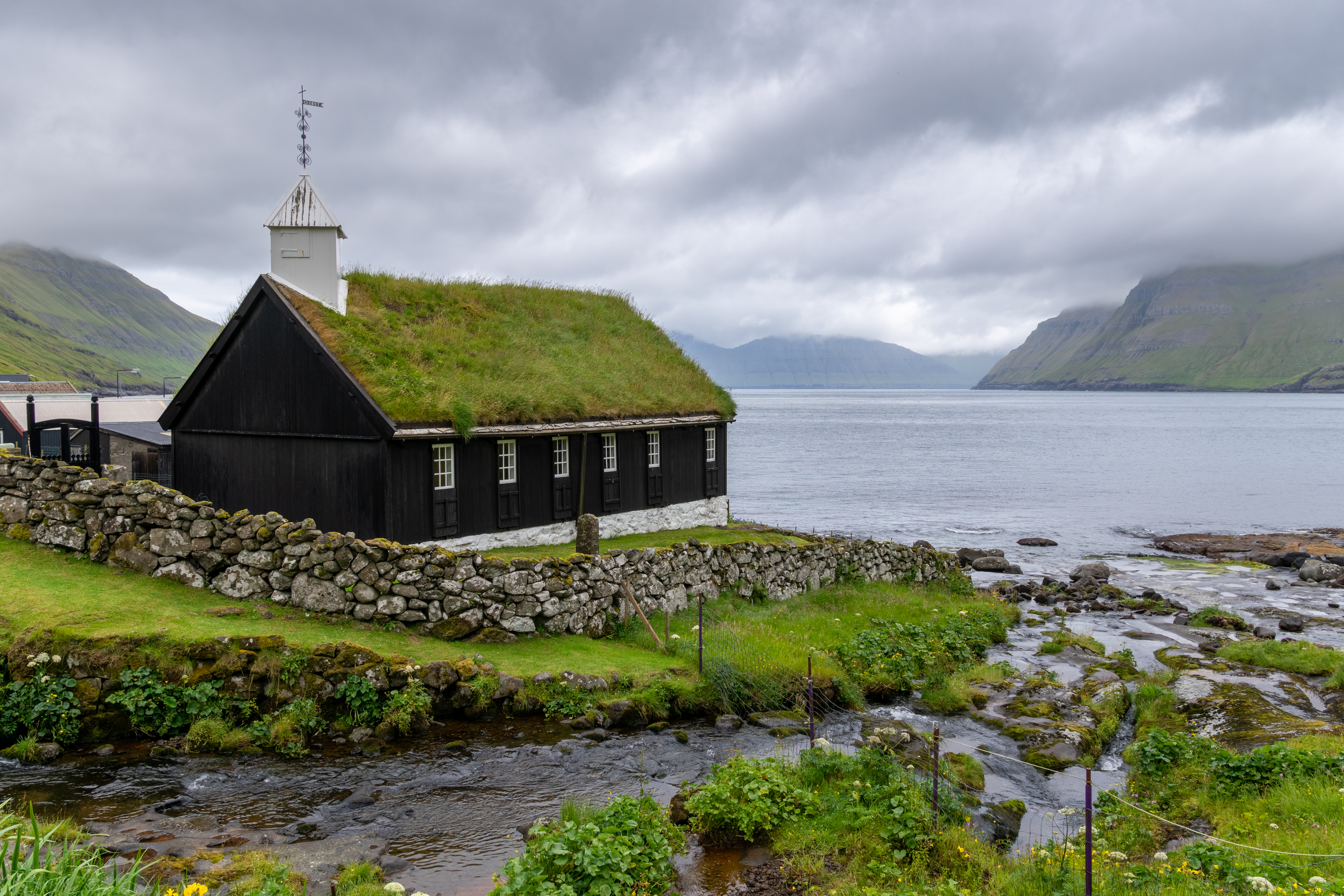
Funningur Church

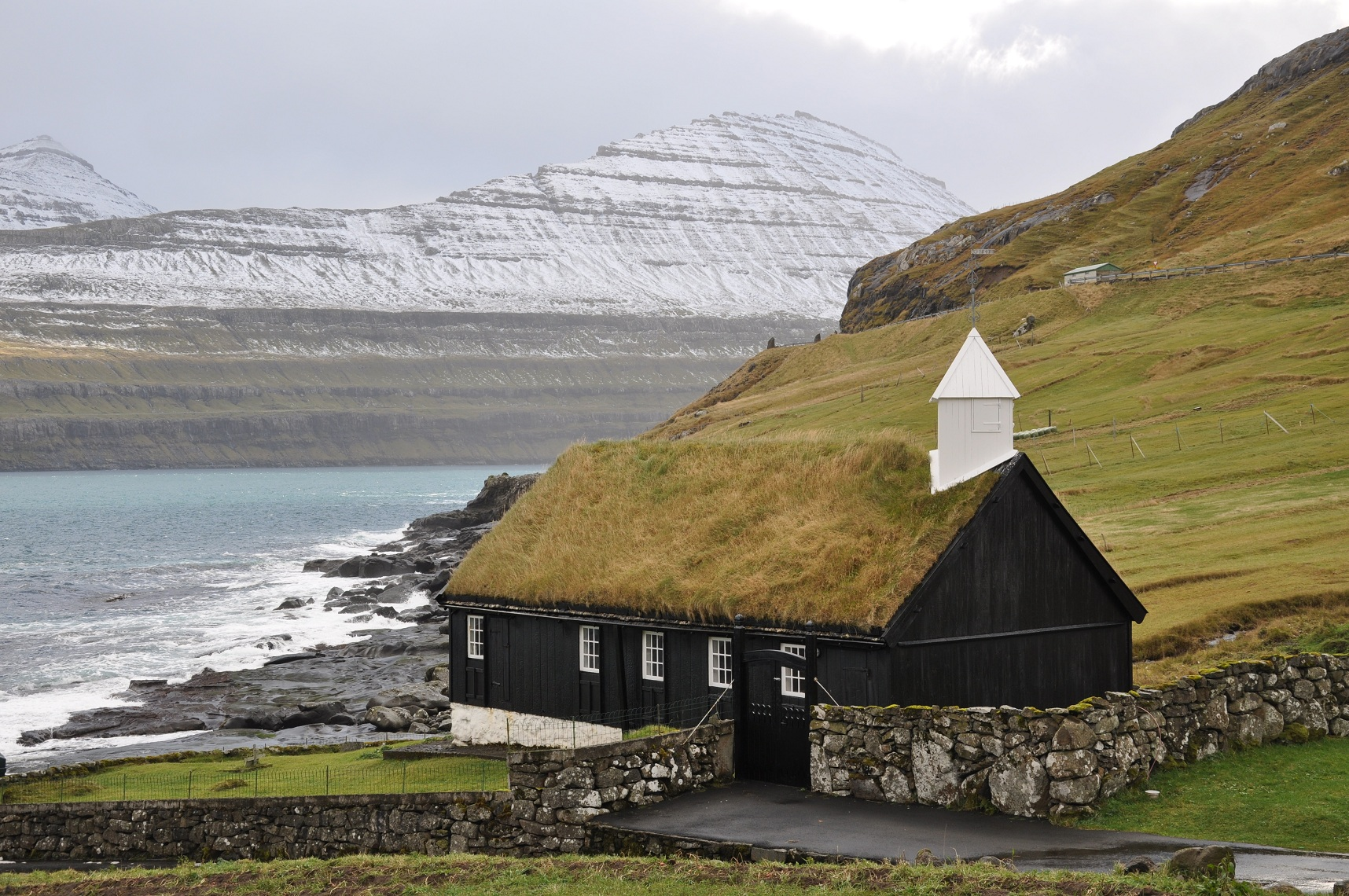
Funningur Church

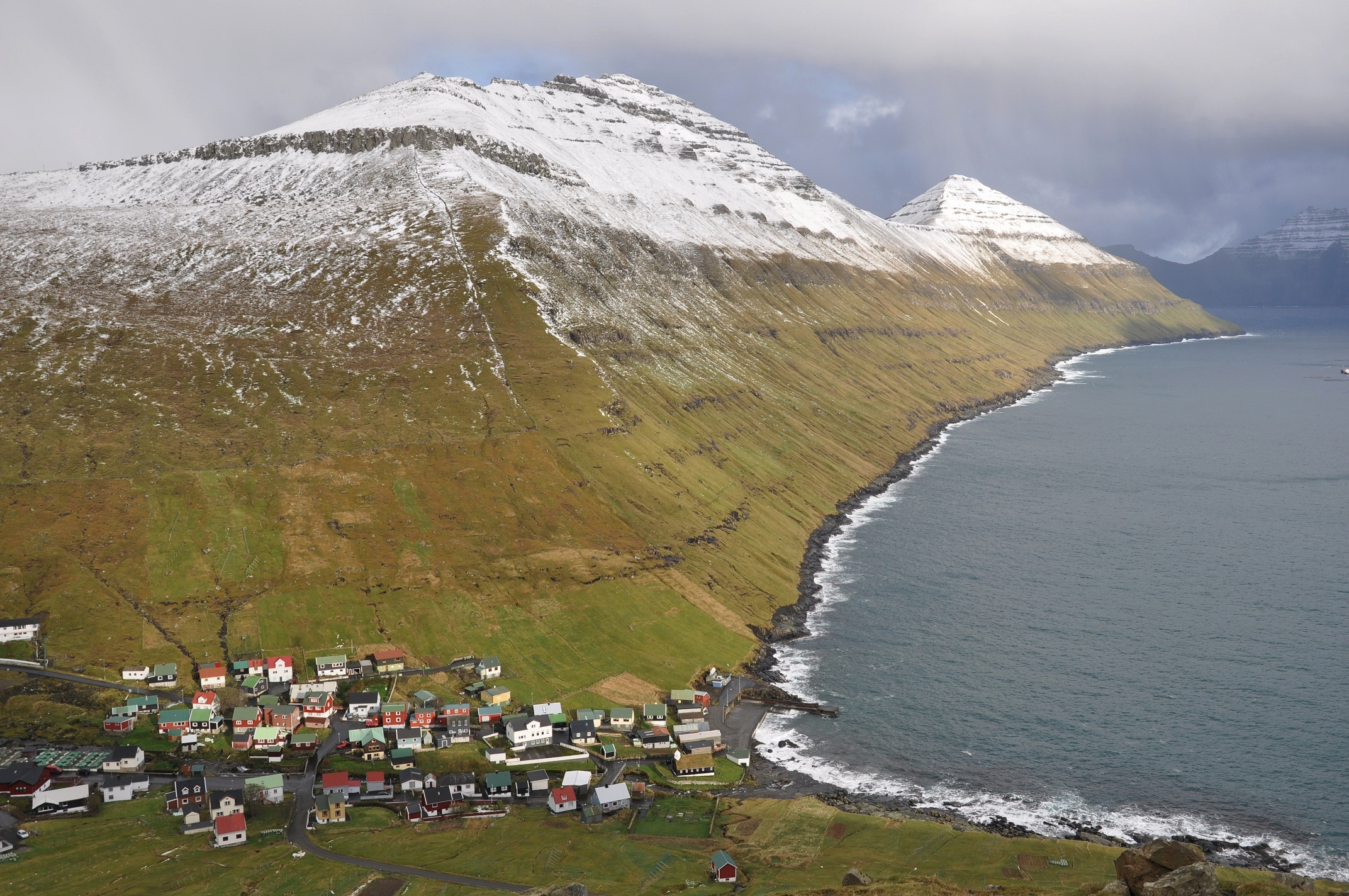
Funningur

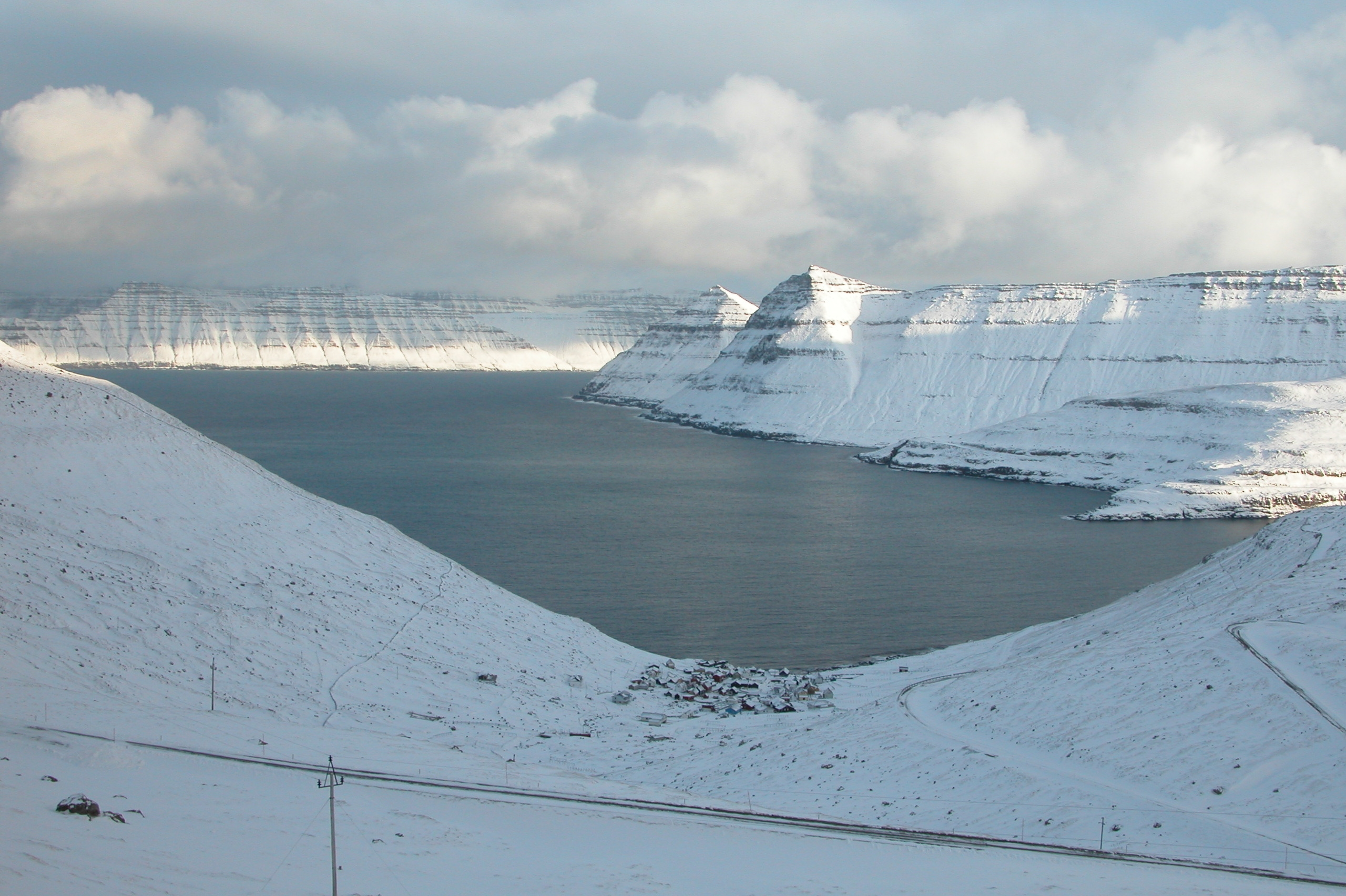
Funningur at the fjord Funningsfjørður

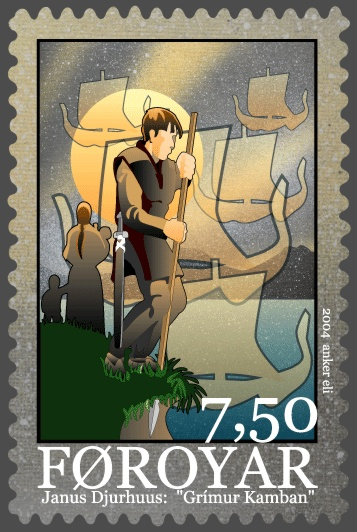
Grímur Kamban

== See also ==
- List of towns in the Faroe Islands
