= Funningur Church =

Church in the Faroe Islands

Coordinates: 62.2868°N 6.9665°W

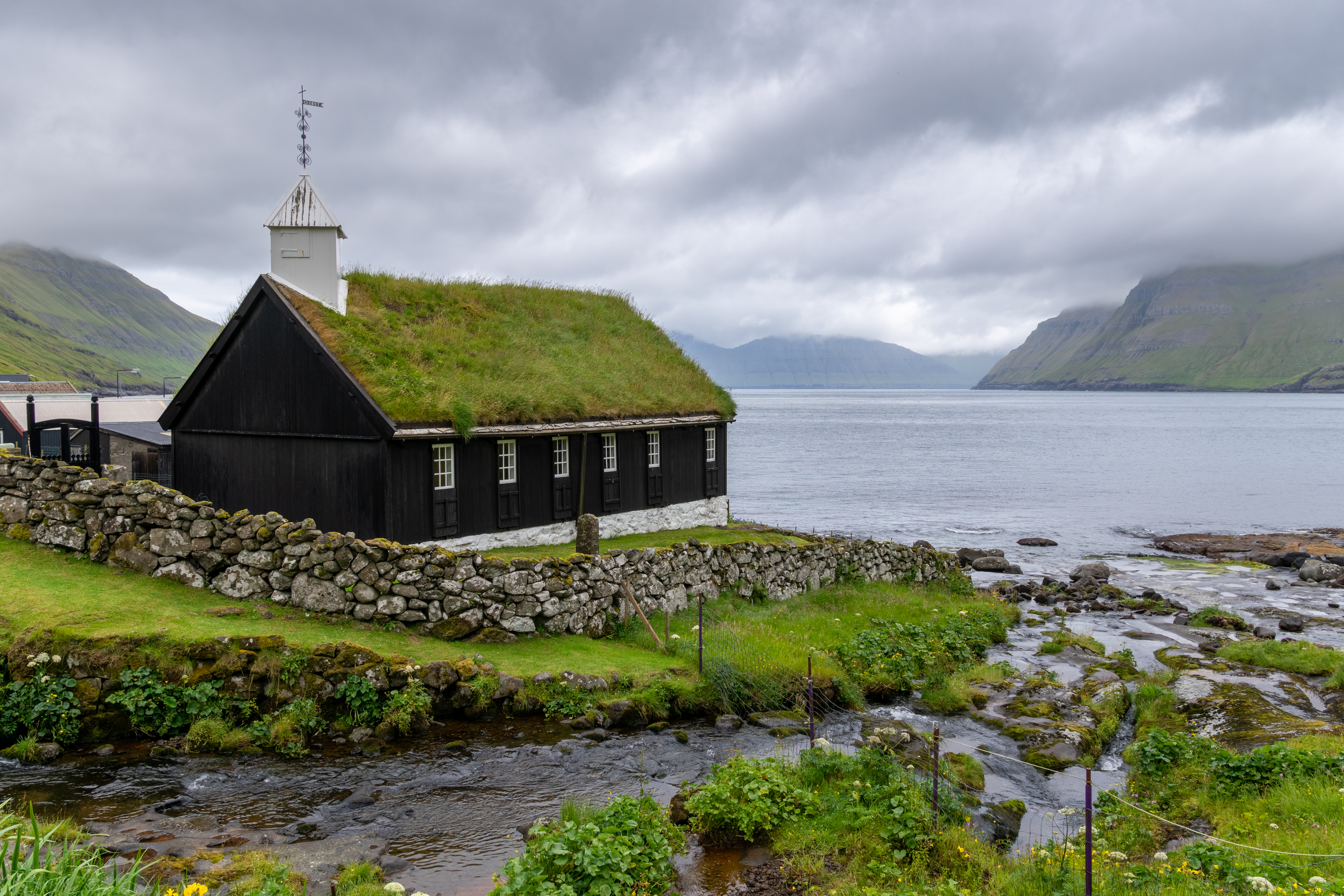
Funningur church

Funninger Church, in the village of Funningur, is one of the 10 remaining old wooden churches in the Faroe Islands built between 1829 and 1847. It was inaugurated on 30 November 1847, and is for that reason the newest of the old traditional wooden churches.

== History ==
Prior to its construction, there had been four prior churches on the same spot, with the first church having been built some time before 1609.

Funningur Church was built by Jákup Andreassen from Syðrugøta, and was inaugurated on 30 November 1847. Porkeri Church was also inaugurated in 1847 but a few months beforehand. Funningur Church is the only wooden church and the oldest church in the Eiði parish. Until 1929, when the Gjógv Church was inaugurated, it was the parish church for both the villages of Funningur and Gjógv.

The spot where the church stands is called Niðri í Hólma ("down on the islet"). Nowadays the area is no longer like an islet, as the River Stórá runs from the north of the church and flows below it. The river also separates the church from the new cemetery, which was inaugurated in 1941 and expanded in 1972.

The church is split into two sides, dividing men's and women's seating. It has 10 pews on the men's side and 9 on the women's side. The pulpit is in front of the foremost of the women's pews. There is an allocated pew for women returning to church after giving birth. There is also a sign reminding churchgoers not to spit on the floor.

The interior of the church features carved, unpainted walls. There is a crucifix originating from the original church on the site, dating from around 1690. The baptismal font also dates from a prior church, from around 1835.
