= Giliðtrítitindur =

Mountain in Vágar, Faroe Islands

Highest point
- Elevation: 643 m (2,110 ft)
- Coordinates: 62°04′35″N 07°11′50″W

Geography
- Location: Vágar, Faroe Islands

Giliðtrítitindur is a mountain located in the island of Vágar (Faroe Islands), at an altitude of 643 metres.

== See also ==
- List of mountains of the Faroe Islands
