= Skúvoy, Skúvoy =

Skúvoy Skuø
- Municipality and village
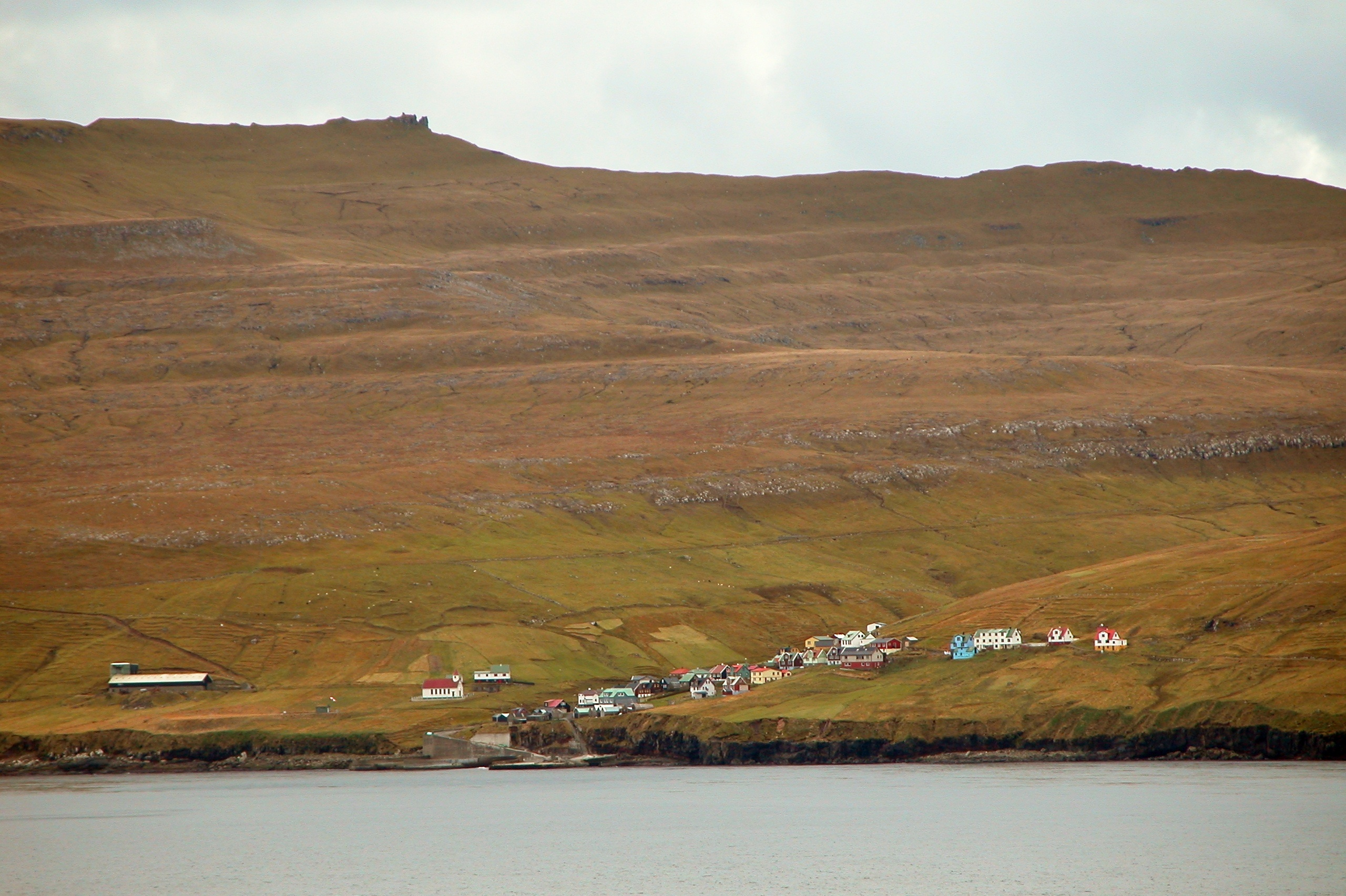
- Skúvoy

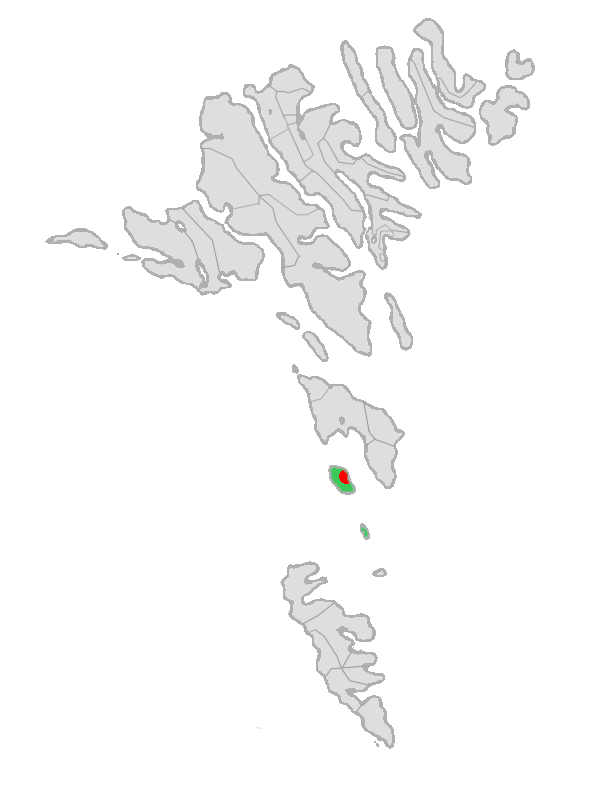
- Location of Skúvoyar kommuna in the Faroe Islands

- Location of Skúvoy village in the Faroe Islands
- Coordinates: 61°46′27″N 6°48′17″W
- State: Kingdom of Denmark
- Constituent country: Faroe Islands
- Island: Skúvoy
- Municipality: Skúvoy

Population (1 January 2006)
  - Total: 52
- Time zone: GMT
  - Summer (DST): UTC+1 (EST)
- Postal code: FO 260
- Climate: Cfc

The village Skúvoy (Danish: Skuø) lies on the east side of the island with the same name.

Skúvoy is the only village on the island. The inhabitants of Skúvoy mainly earn their living from agriculture. There is a ferry to Skúvoy twice a day and the helicopter visits the island 3 times a week.

== History ==
In the graveyard in Skúvoy there is a gravestone called ‘Sigmundarsteinur’ (Stone of Sigmundur). It is said to be the gravestone of Sigmundur Brestisson (from 'Faereyingasaga'). He was a Viking chief who Christianised the Faroe Islands in the year 1000. Tradition says that he lived in his farm on Skúvoy and that he was attacked here by his old enemy Tróndur i Gøtu who was heathen. Sigmundur fled from by jumping into the sea and swimming to Sandvík on the island of Suðuroy (15 km (9 mi)). In Sandvík he was found lying exhausted on the shore by Torgrimur Illi, who decapitated him and stole his golden bangle.

In the 14th century the plague (The Black Death) killed all inhabitants of the island except for one young girl named Rannvá, the daughter of a farmer who was banished for becoming pregnant out of wedlock. The site of her house, Rannvátoft, is on the north part of the island in a valley called Fagridalur; other accounts say another woman from the village, Sunnuva, also survived. In the 18th century, an epidemic of smallpox raged the islands and exterminated the entire population on Skúvoy. The church in Skúvoy dates from 1937. There have been several churches here over the years. The first one said to have been built by Sigmundur Brestisson in the year 999.

Until recently bird catching on the west side of the island was popular. As the number of individuals in the bird colonies has decreased dramatically the bird catching is now limited.

== In popular culture ==
In 1971, Faroese author Dagmar Joensen-Næs published the historical novel Rannvá. It was later adapted into a film in 1975 by Spanish director Miguel Marin Hidalgo. The film was the first in the Faroese language, more than 20 years before Faroese would be granted official language status, with a fully Faroese cast of amateurs.

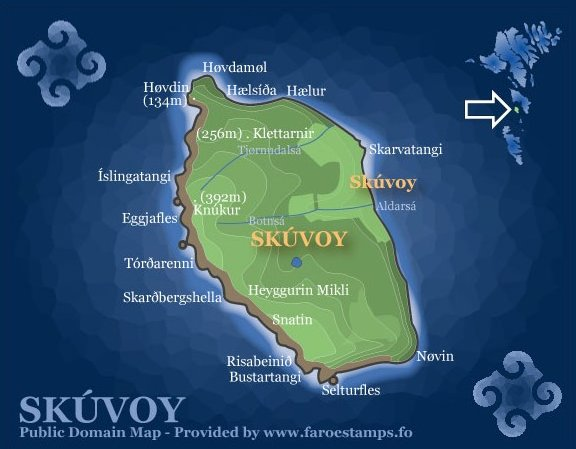
Postcard of Skúvoy

== See also ==
- List of towns in the Faroe Islands
