= Haraldssund =

- Village
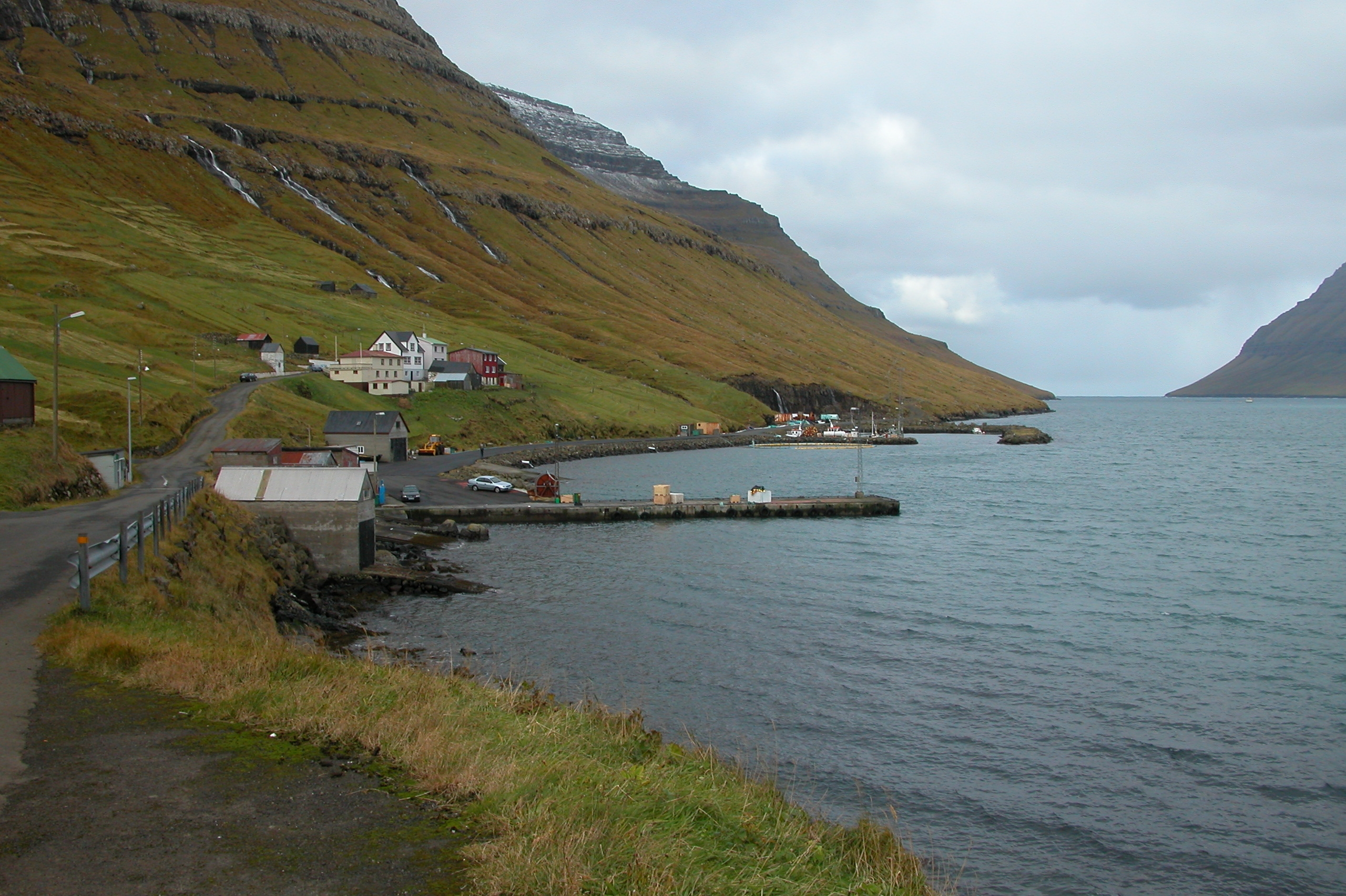
- Haraldssund

- Location in the Faroe Islands
- Coordinates: 62°16′20″N 6°36′7″W
- State: Kingdom of Denmark
- Constituent country: Faroe Islands
- Island: Kunoy
- Municipality: Kunoyar

Population (September 2025)
  - Total: 69
- Time zone: GMT
  - Summer (DST): UTC+1 (EST)
- Postal code: FO 785
- Climate: Cfc

Haraldssund (Danish: Haraldsund) is a settlement in the Faroe Islands, situated on the island of Kunoy.

Haraldssund is located on the east coast of Kunoy and is connected to the village of Kunoy on the west coast by a tunnel. To the east, it is linked to the town of Klaksvík on Borðoy by a causeway. The tunnel and the causeway were built in the late 1980s.

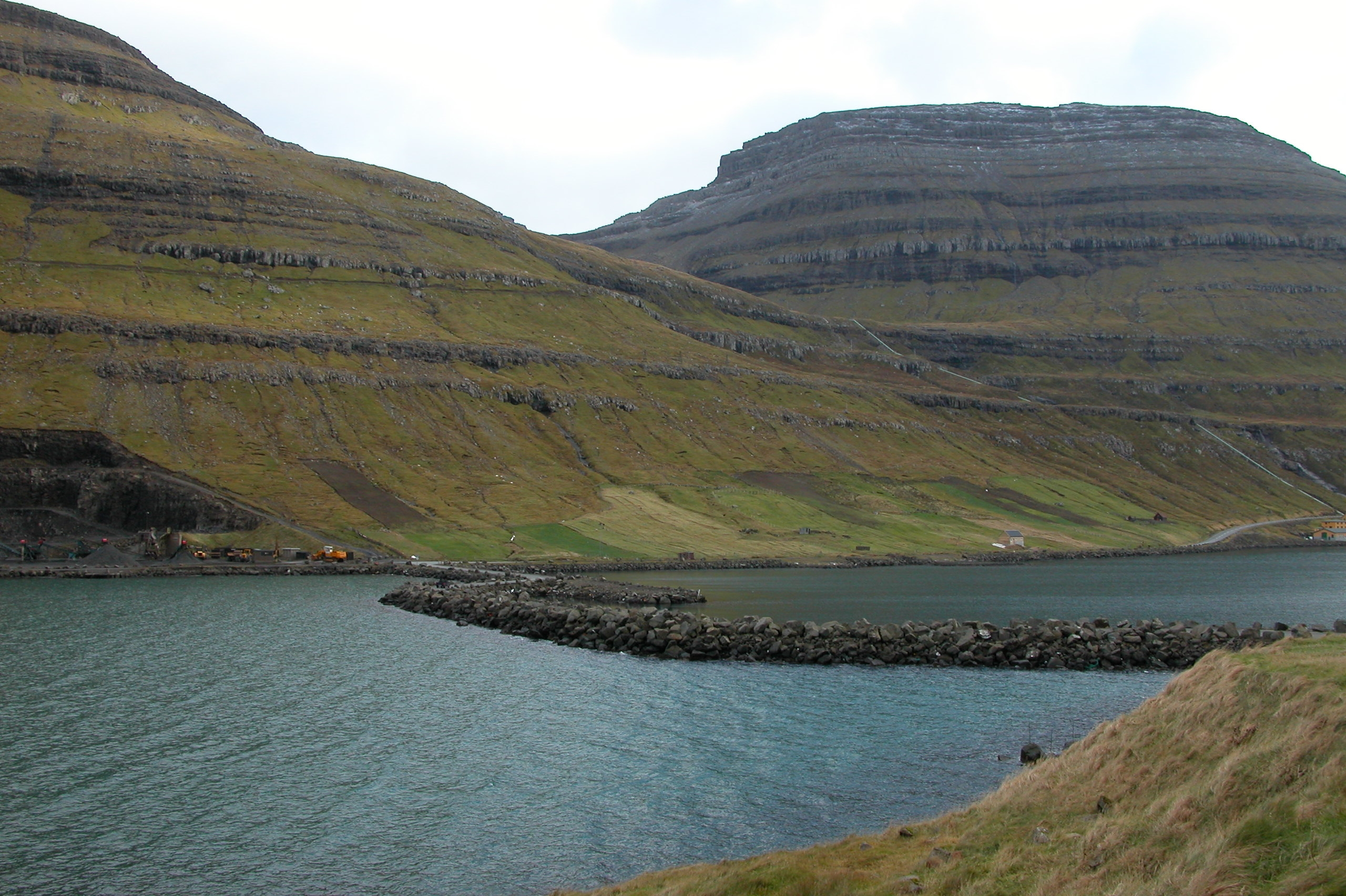
Causeway from Borðoy

Two kilometers south of the village is a small ruin.

== See also ==
- List of towns in the Faroe Islands
