= Knútur (Skúvoy) =

Hill in Skúvoy, Faroe Islands

Coordinates: 61°46′14″N 6°49′16″W

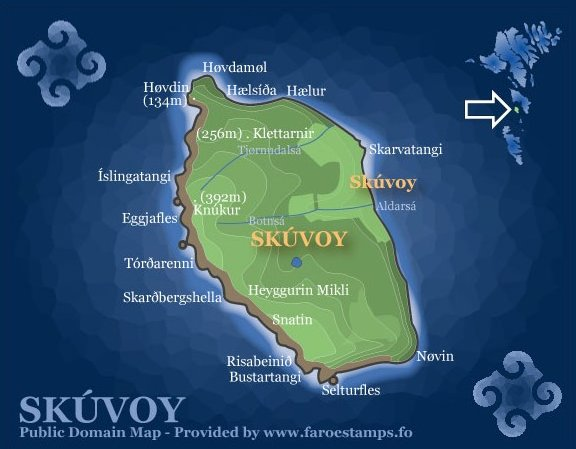

Knútur (also known as Knúkur) is marginally the highest point of Skúvoy in the central Faroe Islands. Located on the western side of the island, the hill has a height of 392 or 393 metres. Heyggjurin Mikli towards the south of Skúvoy is marginally lower at 391 metres.
