= Kunoy =

- Island
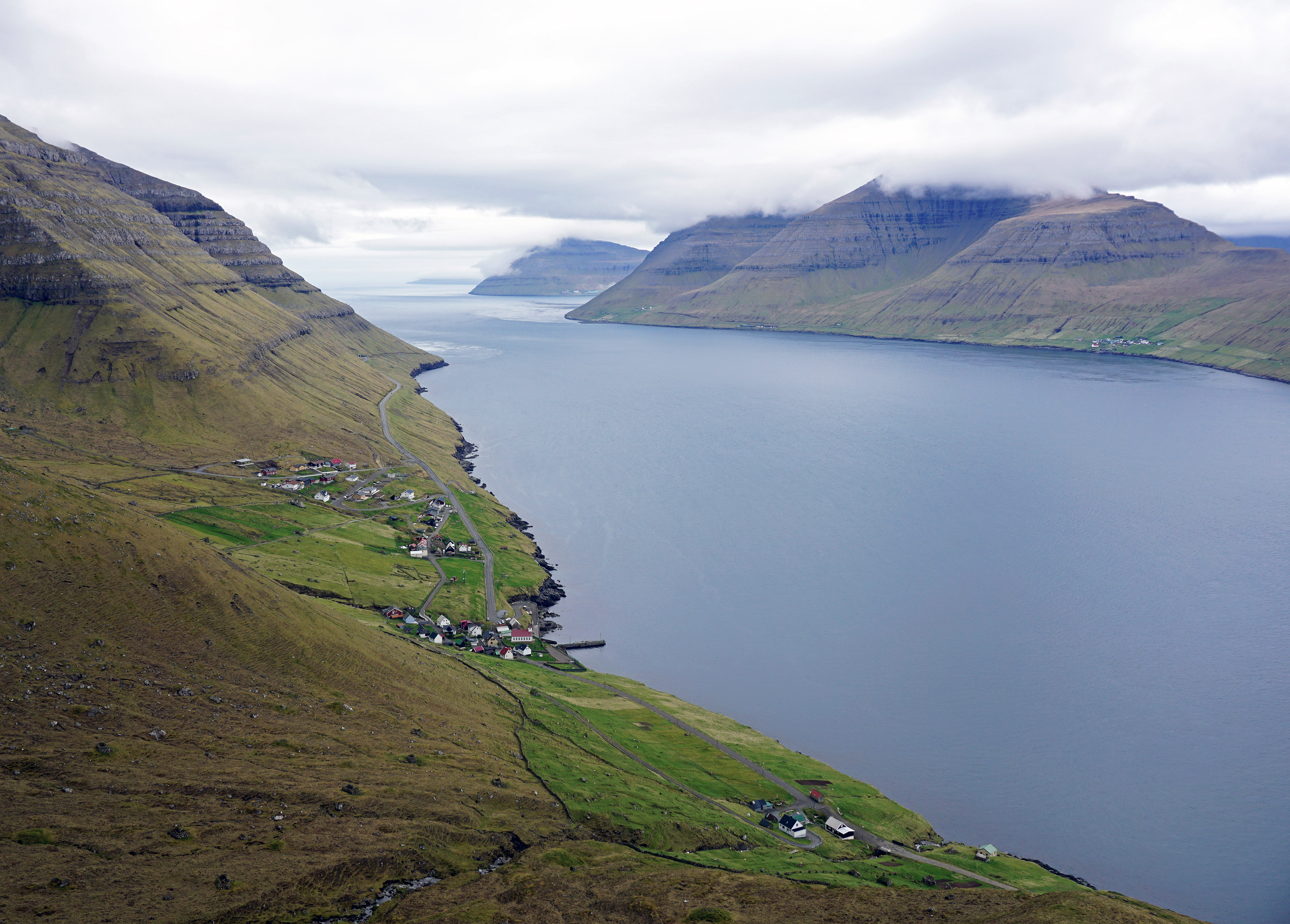
- Village of Kunoy

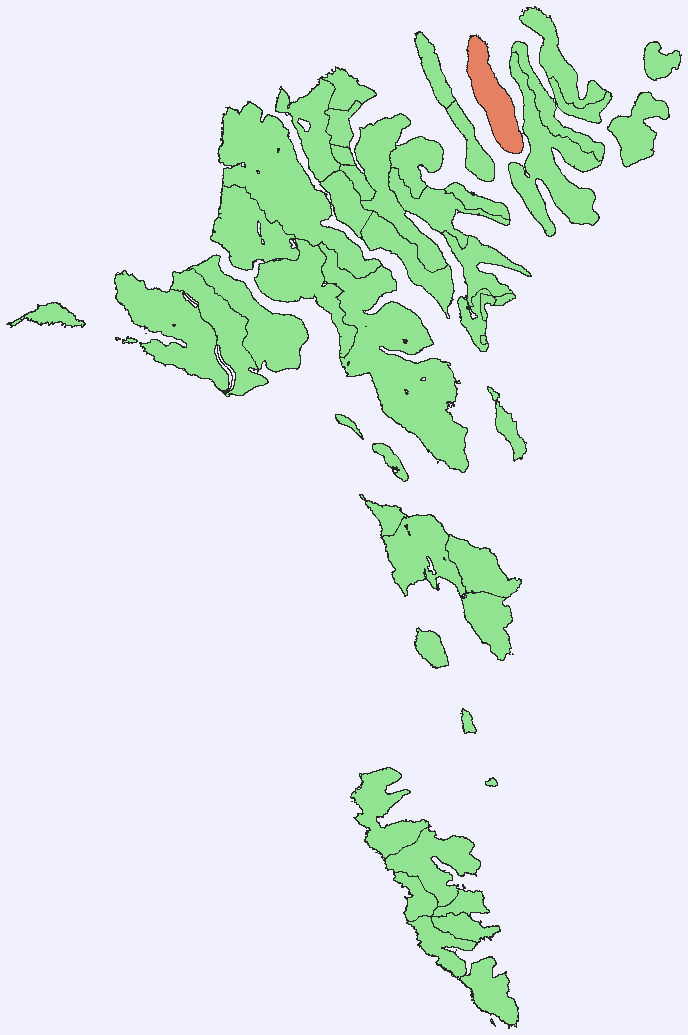
- Location within the Faroe Islands
- Coordinates: 62°18′N 6°39′W
- State: Kingdom of Denmark
- Constituent country: Faroe Islands
- Municipality seat: Kunoy

Area
  - Total: 35.5 km^{2} (13.7 sq mi)
  - Rank: 8
- Highest elevation: 830 m (2,720 ft)

Population (2020)
  - Total: 156
  - Rank: 11
  - Density: 4.39/km^{2} (11.4/sq mi)
- Time zone: UTC+0 (GMT)
  - Summer (DST): UTC+1 (WEST)
- Calling code: 298

Kunoy (Faroese pronunciation: [ˈkuːnɪ], lit. 'Woman island') is an island located in the north-east of the Faroe Islands between Kalsoy to the west (with which there is no physical link) and Borðoy to the east (to which it is linked via a causeway).

== Settlements and transport ==
There are two settlements on Kunoy: Kunoy (population 64) on the west coast and Haraldssund on the south-east coast. These have been connected by a tunnel since 1988. Haraldssund is connected by a causeway to the neighbouring island of Borðoy to the east of Kunoy. Before the causeway was built, travel to the island was by ferry. Nowadays the 504 bus runs a regular service across the causeway, with a route from Klaksvík through Ánir then across to Haraldssund and through the tunnel to Kunoy.

A third settlement, Skarð, was the site of a fishing accident on Christmas Eve, 1913 which killed seven men (all the male population except a 14-year-old and a 70-year-old). The women decided to move to Haraldssund, and the area is now deserted.

== Geography ==
=== Important Bird Area ===
The coastline of the northern tip of the island has been identified as an Important Bird Area by BirdLife International because of its significance as a breeding site for seabirds, especially European storm petrels (250 pairs) and black guillemots (200 pairs).

The brown rat, was introduced on purpose by people from Klaksvík, to the island in 1914 over some slight, and it has done tremendous damage to the bird population since then, most notably the Atlantic puffin.

=== Mountains ===
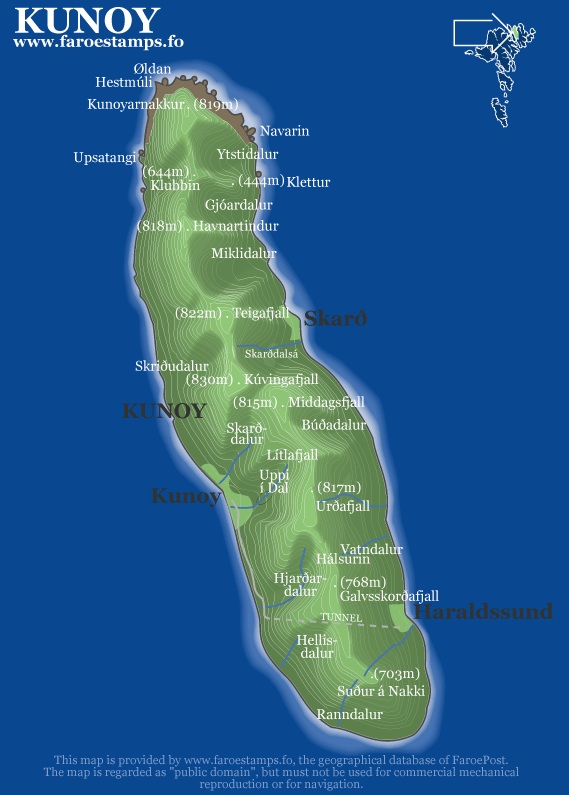
Map of Kunoy

The island has the following eleven mountains, shown with their overall rank in the Faroe Islands: The top of Klubbin is well known for its vegetation, as it is one of the few areas where there never have been grazing sheep.

Rank	Name	Height
4	Kúvingafjall	830m
5	Teigafjall	825m
6	Kunoyarnakkur	819m
7	Havnartindur	818m
8	Urðafjall	817m
9	Middagsfjall	805m
18	Galvsskorafjall	768m
42	Suður á Nakki	703m
73	Klubbin	644m
198	Lítlafjall	471m
219	Klettur	444m

== Notable people ==
- Símun av Skarði (1872–1942), the Faroese poet, politician and teacher and founder of the Faroese Folk High School (Føroya Fólkaháskúli) was born in Skarð, which was a small settlement on Kunoy, which was abandoned in 1919. He wrote the Faroese National Anthem, Mítt alfagra land.
