= Gráfelli =

Mountain of the Faroe Islands

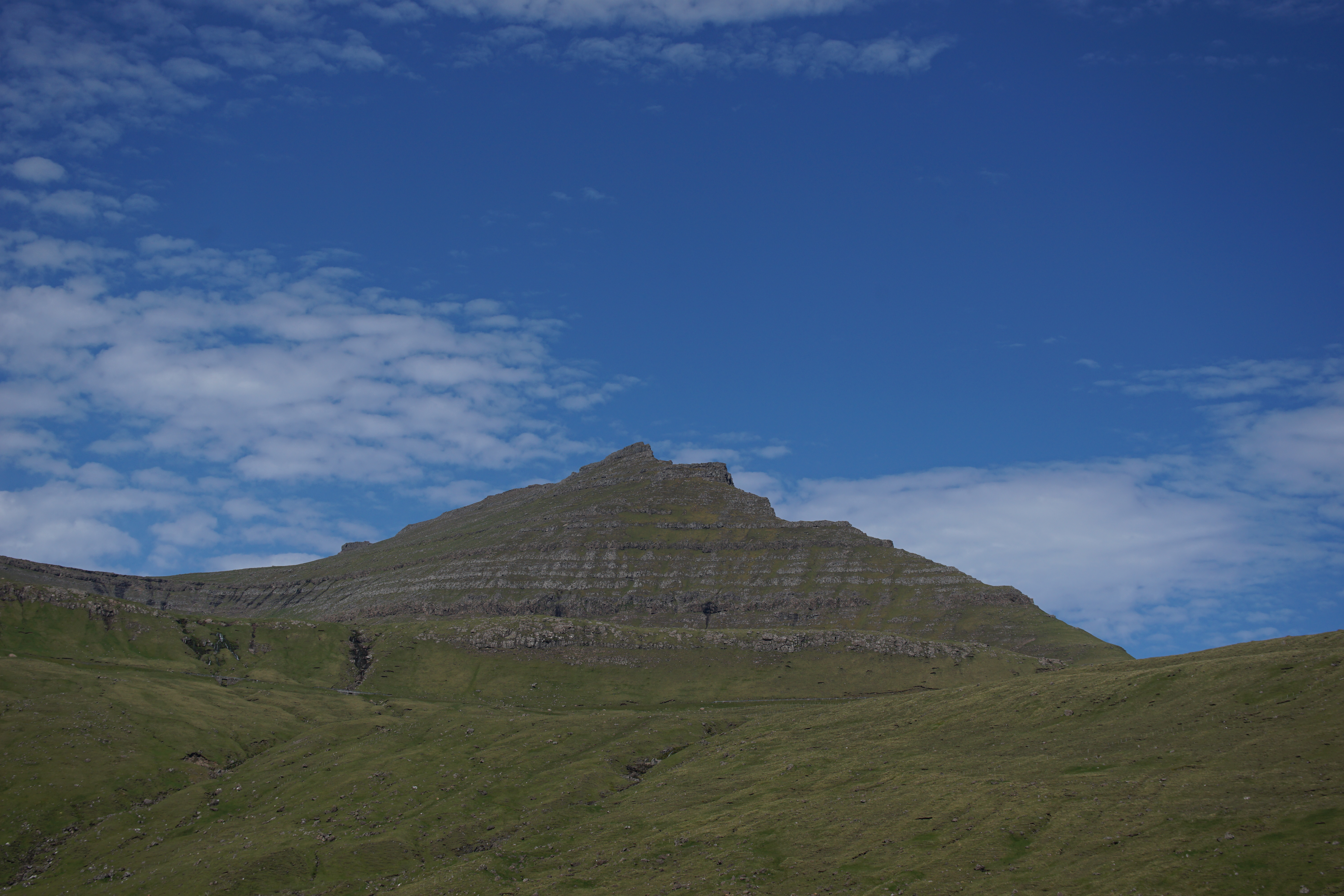

Highest point
- Elevation: 856 m (2,808 ft)
- Prominence: 222 m (728 ft)
- Isolation: 1.54 km (0.96 mi)
- Coordinates: 62°18′N 7°00′W

Geography

Gráfelli is the second highest mountain of the Faroe Islands located on the island of Eysturoy. It has an elevation of 856 metres. Slættaratindur just south-east of the mountain is 24 metres higher at 880 metres, the highest point of the Faroes. Funningur lies at the foot of both Slættaratindur and Gráfelli.
