= Nónfjall =

Mountain on the island Vágar in the Faroe Islands

Coordinates: 61.517°N 6.833°W

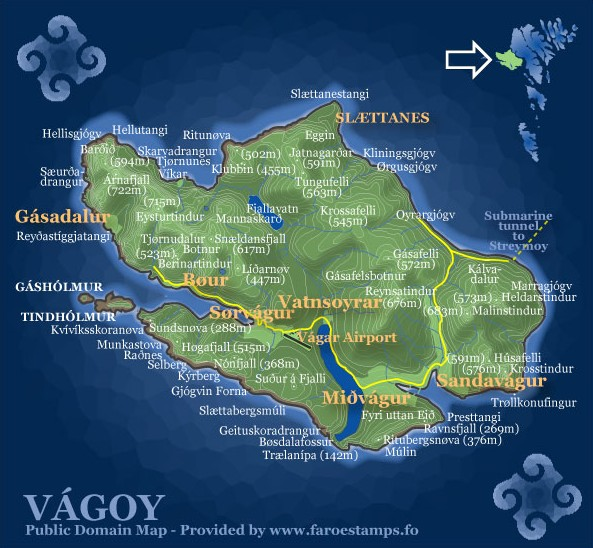
Map of Vágar island (Vágoy), Nónfjall is south of Sørvágur and Vágar Airport.

Nónfjall is a 367-metre-high (1,204 ft) mountain on the island of Vágar in the Faroe Islands. The mountain is located south of the village of Sørvágur, near Vágar Airport and east of the mountain Høgafjall. The name Nónfjall translates to 'Noon mountain'. However, the Faroese use the word noon differently from the current English usage. In the Faroese language noon refers to 15:00 in the 24-hour clock or 3pm in the 12-hour clock, whereas in the English language noon usually now refers to 12:00 or 12pm.

If you are standing in the centre of the old village in Sørvágur at 15:00 you will see the sun above Nónfjall. Hence the name.

Nónfjall lies above the valley of Kjóvadalur.
