= Kambur =

Mountain in Faroe Islands

Coordinates: 62°08′N 6°48′W

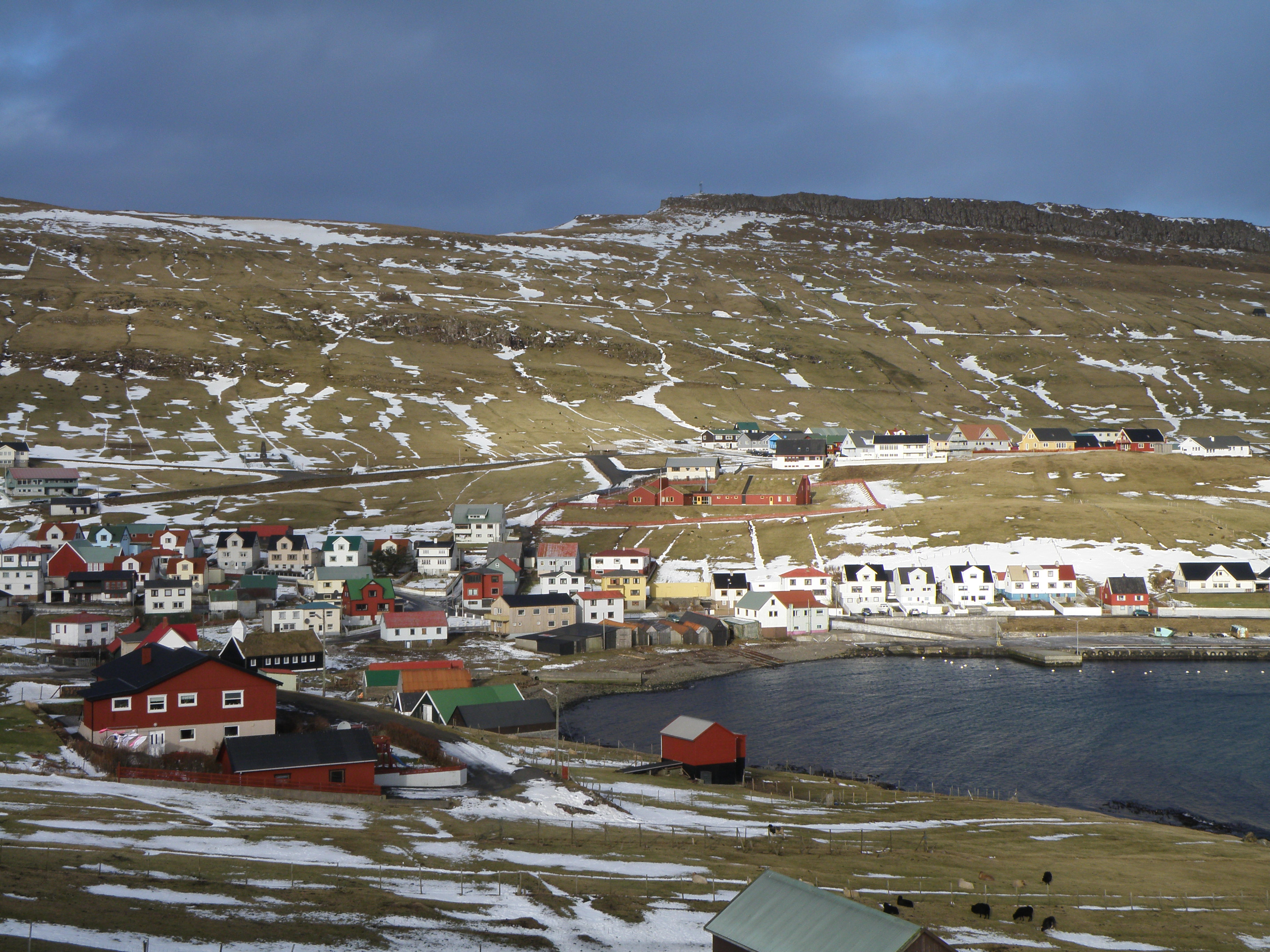
Porkeri and the mountain Kambur.

Kambur is a mountain in Suðuroy, Faroe Islands, located on the northern side of the village Porkeri: Kambur is also visible from Hov.
