= Skúvoy =

Skúvoy Skúgvoy Skuø (Danish)
- Island
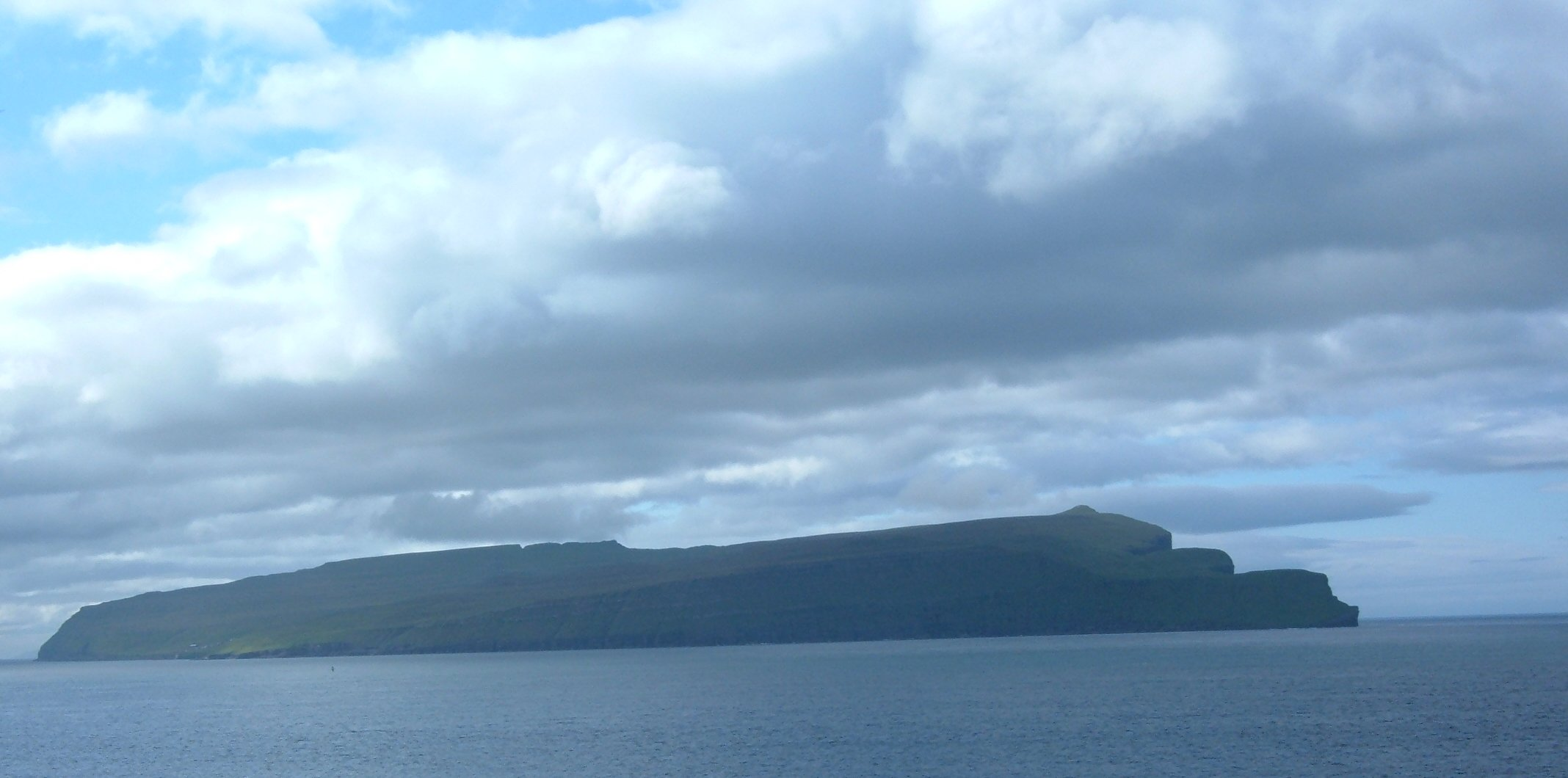
- Skúvoy, as seen from Sandoy

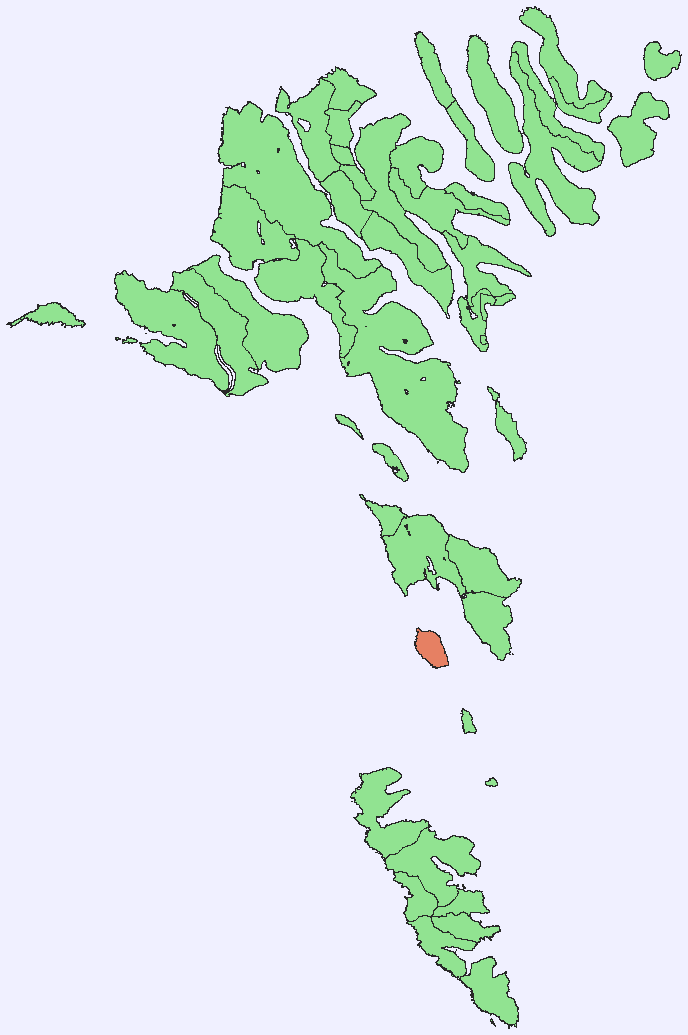
- Location within the Faroe Islands
- Coordinates: 61°46′N 6°49′W
- State: Kingdom of Denmark
- Constituent country: Faroe Islands

Area
  - Total: 10 km^{2} (3.9 sq mi)

Population (7 January 2020)
  - Total: 40
  - Density: 4.0/km^{2} (10/sq mi)
- Time zone: UTC+0 (GMT)
  - Summer (DST): UTC+1 (WEST)
- Calling code: 298

Designations

Ramsar Wetland
- Official name: Skuvoy
- Designated: 31 May 2012
- Reference no.: 2053

Skúvoy (Faroese pronunciation: [ˈskʉuːwɪ]) or Skúgvoy (Faroese pronunciation: [ˈskɪkvɪ]; Danish: Skuø) is an island in the central Faroe Islands, located to the southwest of Sandoy.

It is named after the large number of great skua present on the island (who have a habit of attacking intruders). There is only one settlement on the island: Skúvoy on the east coast. There are two mountains: Knúkur (392 m) and Heyggjurin Mikli (391 m).

== History ==
The Black Death in the 14th century killed all the inhabitants except one woman; her cottage can still be seen. Skúvoy was also the home of Sigmundur Brestisson, the hero of the Færeyinga saga (Saga of the Faroese).

== Bird habitat ==
There are 300–400 m cliffs along the west coast, which are home to many guillemots. Egg harvesting takes place in early June, though this occurs in the first week only so as to allow the guillemots to lay again. The island has been identified as an Important Bird Area by BirdLife International because of its significance as a breeding site for seabirds, especially northern fulmars (50,000 pairs), Manx shearwaters (10,000 pairs), European storm petrels (20,000 pairs), great skuas (25 pairs), Atlantic puffins (40,000 pairs), common guillemots (135,000 pairs) and black guillemots (150 pairs), as well as 40 breeding pairs of Eurasian whimbrels.

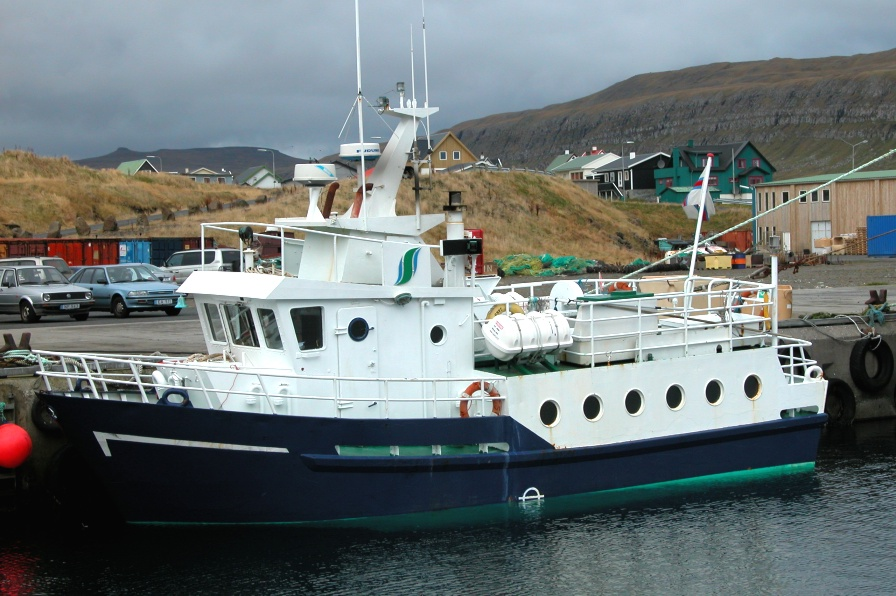
The Skúgvoy ferry in Sandur harbour

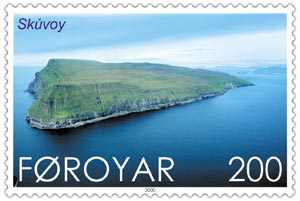
Stamp FR 373 of Postverk Føroya
Issued: 22 May 2000
Photo: Per á Hædd

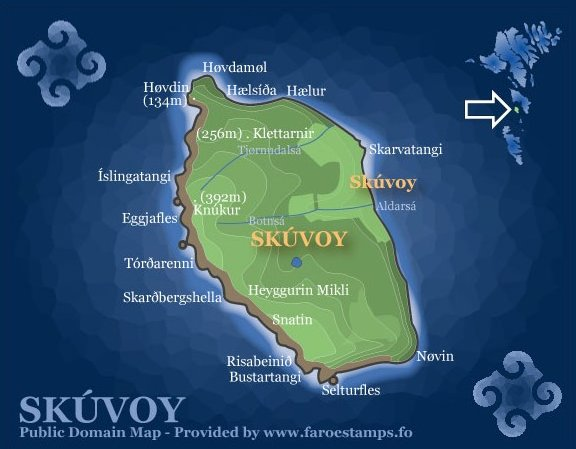
Map of Skúgvoy

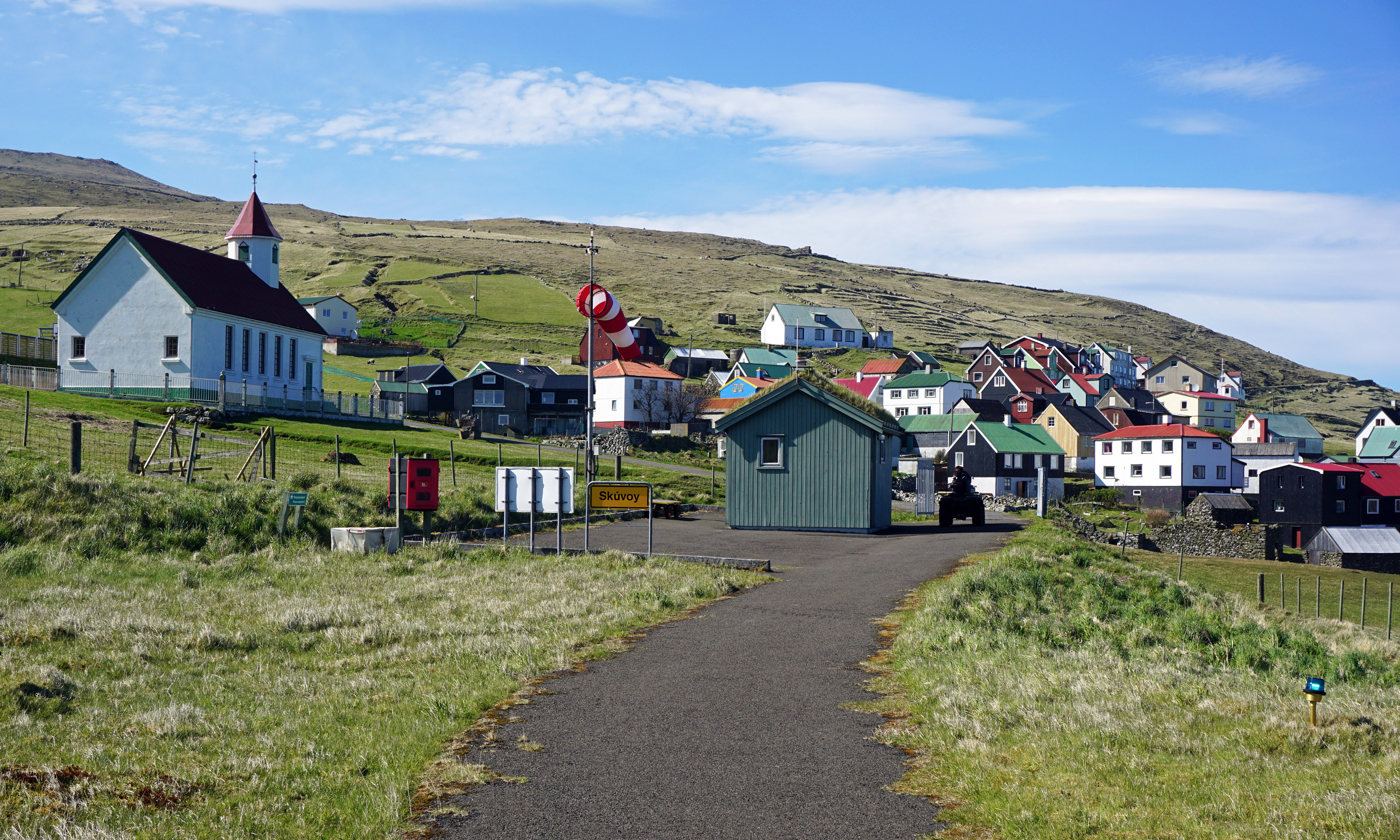
Skúgvoy village
