= Slættaratindur =

Highest mountain in the Faroe Islands

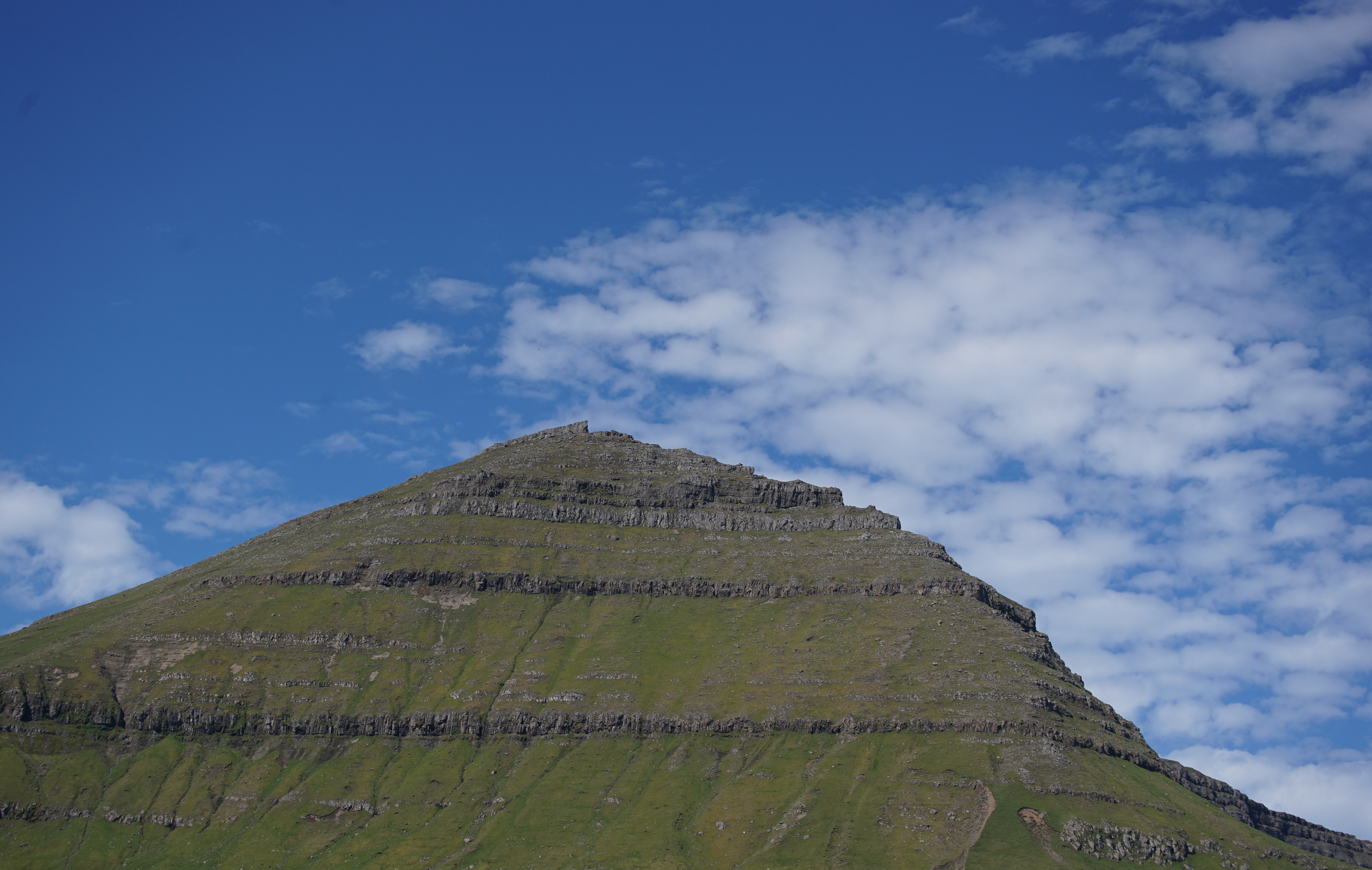

Highest point
- Elevation: 880 m (2,890 ft)
- Prominence: 880 m (2,890 ft)
- Isolation: 446.58 km (277.49 mi)
- Coordinates: 62°17′47″N 7°00′45″W

Geography
- Location within Denmark Faroe Islands
- Location: Eysturoy, Faroe Islands

Slættaratindur is the highest mountain in the Faroe Islands, at an elevation of 880 metres. It is located in the northern part of Eysturoy, between the villages of Eiði, Gjógv, and Funningur. Funningur is situated at the base of the mountain. Due to the steepness of the surrounding terrain, the mountain's summit is not visible from within the village itself.

Its name means "flat summit". It can be climbed in about three hours, and although the routes are steep, technical climbing skills are not necessary to reach the summit. In clear weather, the summit gives views over the entire archipelago. Slættaratindur is one of ten mountains in the Faroe Islands which rise to over 800 m above sea level. Gráfelli, the second-highest peak at 856 m, lies just to the north-east of Slættaratindur.
