= Lists of mountains by region =

Lists of mountains can be organized by continent and more specifically by country and province/state:

== Africa ==
- Highest mountain peaks of Africa
- List of Ultras of Africa

=== Mountains of Africa by country ===
- List of mountains in Algeria
- List of mountains in Cape Verde
- List of mountains in the Central African Republic
- List of mountains in Ethiopia
- List of mountains in Lesotho
- List of mountains in Morocco
- List of mountains in São Tomé and Príncipe
- List of mountains in South Africa
- List of mountains in Eswatini
- List of mountains in Kenya
- List of mountains in Uganda

== Asia ==
- List of Altai mountains
- List of Himalayan peaks
- List of Ultras of Central Asia
- List of Ultras of the Himalayas
- List of Ultras of the Karakoram and Hindu Kush
- List of ultras of the Malay Archipelago
- List of ultras of Northeast Asia
- List of Ultras of Southeast Asia
- List of Ultras of Tibet, East Asia and neighbouring areas
- List of Ultras of West Asia

=== Mountains of Asia by country ===
- List of mountains in Afghanistan
- List of mountains in Armenia
- List of mountains in Azerbaijan
- List of mountains in Bangladesh
- List of mountains in Bhutan
- List of mountains in Burma
- List of mountains in China
  - List of mountains in Hong Kong
- List of mountains in Georgia
- List of mountains in India
- List of mountains in Indonesia
  - List of mountains in Bali
- List of mountains in Iran
- List of mountains in Japan
  - List of Ultras of Japan
  - 100 Famous Japanese Mountains - The major summits in Japan selected by Kyūya Fukada
  - Three-thousanders (in Japan) - The 21 major 3000 meter summits in Japan
- List of mountains in Kazakhstan
- List of mountains in Korea
- List of mountains in Laos
- List of mountains in Lebanon
- List of mountains in Malaysia
- List of mountains in Mongolia
- List of mountains in Nepal
- List of mountains in Oman
- List of mountains in Pakistan
- List of mountains in the Philippines
  - List of Ultras of the Philippines
  - List of Philippine provinces and regions by highest point
- List of mountains in Russia
- List of mountains in Saudi Arabia
- List of mountains in Sri Lanka
- List of mountains in Syria
- List of mountains in Taiwan
- List of mountains of Tajikistan
- List of mountains in Thailand
- List of mountains in Turkey
- List of mountains in Turkmenistan
- List of mountains in the United Arab Emirates
- List of mountains in Uzbekistan

== Antarctica ==
- List of Ultras of Antarctica
- List of mountains of East Antarctica
  - List of mountains of Wilkes Land
  - List of mountains of Enderby Land
  - List of mountains of Queen Maud Land
  - List of mountains of Mac. Robertson Land
  - List of mountains of Princess Elizabeth Land

== Australasia and Oceania ==
- List of highest mountains of Australasia
- List of Ultras of Oceania

=== Mountains of Australasia and Oceania by country ===
- List of mountains in Australia
  - List of mountains in the Australian Capital Territory
  - List of mountains of New South Wales
  - List of mountains of the Northern Territory
  - List of mountains of Queensland
  - List of mountains of South Australia
  - List of mountains of Tasmania
    - Highest mountains of Tasmania
  - List of mountains of Victoria
  - List of mountains of Western Australia
- List of mountains of Guam
- List of mountains of Hawaii
  - List of mountain peaks of Hawaii
- List of highest mountains of New Guinea
- List of mountains of New Zealand by height
- List of mountains of the Northern Mariana Islands

== Europe ==
- List of European ultra-prominent peaks
- Most isolated major summits of Europe

=== Mountains of Europe by range ===
- List of mountains of the Alps
  - List of mountains of the Alps above 3000 m
  - List of mountains of the Alps (2500–2999 m)
  - List of mountains of the Alps (2000–2499 m)
  - List of Alpine peaks by prominence
  - List of Alpine four-thousanders
- List of mountains of the Balkans
- List of mountains of the Elbe Sandstone Mountains
- List of mountains of the Harz
- List of Pyrenean three-thousanders

=== Mountains of Europe by country ===
- List of mountains in Albania
- List of mountains in Armenia
- List of mountains in Austria
- List of mountains in Belgium
- List of mountains in Bosnia and Herzegovina
- List of mountains in Bulgaria
  - List of mountain peaks in Pirin
- List of mountains in Croatia
- List of mountains in the Czech Republic
- List of hills and mountains in Denmark
  - List of mountains in the Faroe Islands
- List of mountains in Estonia
- List of mountains in Finland
- List of mountains in France
- List of mountains in Germany
  - List of mountain and hill ranges in Germany
  - List of the highest mountains in the German states
    - in Baden-Württemberg
    - in Bavaria
    - in Berlin
    - in Brandenburg
    - in Hamburg
    - in Hesse
    - in Mecklenburg-Vorpommern
    - in Lower Saxony
    - in North Rhine-Westphalia
    - in Rhineland-Palatinate
    - in Saarland
    - in Saxony
    - in Saxony-Anhalt
    - in Schleswig-Holstein
    - in Thuringia
- List of mountains in Greece
- List of mountains in Georgia
- List of mountains in Hungary
- List of mountains in Iceland
- List of mountains in Ireland
- List of mountains in Italy
- List of mountains in Kosovo
- List of mountains in Liechtenstein
- List of mountains in Montenegro
- List of mountains and hills in the Netherlands
- List of mountains in North Macedonia
- List of mountains in Norway
- List of mountains in Poland
- List of mountains in Romania
- List of mountains in Serbia
- List of mountains in Slovakia
- List of mountains in Slovenia
- List of mountains in Spain
  - List of mountains in Aragon
  - List of mountains in Catalonia
  - List of mountains of La Gomera
  - List of mountains in the Valencian Community
- List of mountains in Sweden
- List of mountains in Switzerland
  - above 3000 m
  - highest
  - most isolated
  - accessible by public transport
  - named after people
  - by canton
    - Appenzell Ausserrhoden
    - Appenzell Innerrhoden
    - Bern
    - Glarus
    - Grisons
    - Nidwalden
    - Obwalden
    - Schwyz
    - St. Gallen
    - Ticino
    - Uri
    - Valais
    - Vaud
- List of mountains in Turkey
- List of mountains in the United Kingdom
  - List of mountains and hills of Saint Helena, Ascension and Tristan da Cunha
- List of mountains in Ukraine

== North America ==
- List of the highest major summits of North America
  - List of the highest islands of North America
- List of Ultras of North America
- List of the major 100-kilometer summits of North America
- List of extreme summits of North America
- Lists of mountain ranges of North America

=== Greenland ===
- List of the ultra-prominent summits of Greenland
- List of mountain ranges of Greenland
- List of mountains of Greenland

=== Canada ===
- List of mountains of Canada
  - List of the highest major summits of Canada
  - List of the most prominent summits of Canada
  - List of the most isolated major summits of Canada
  - List of extreme summits of Canada
- List of mountain ranges of Canada

==== Mountains of Canada by province or territory ====
- List of mountains of Alberta
- List of mountains of British Columbia
- List of mountains of Manitoba
- List of mountains of New Brunswick
- List of mountains of Newfoundland and Labrador
- List of mountains of the Northwest Territories
- List of mountains of Nova Scotia
- List of mountains of Nunavut
- List of mountains of Ontario
- List of mountains of Prince Edward Island
- List of mountains of Quebec
  - List of mountain ranges of Quebec
- List of mountains of Saskatchewan
- List of mountains of Yukon

=== Rocky Mountains ===
- Rocky Mountains
  - List of mountain peaks of the Rocky Mountains
    - List of extreme summits of the Rocky Mountains
    - List of the highest major summits of the Rocky Mountains
    - List of the most isolated major summits of the Rocky Mountains
    - List of the most prominent summits of the Rocky Mountains
  - Canadian Rockies
    - List of mountains in the Canadian Rockies
    - Ranges of the Canadian Rockies
  - Southern Rocky Mountains
    - List of mountain peaks of the Southern Rocky Mountains
    - List of mountain ranges of the Southern Rocky Mountains

=== United States ===
- List of mountains of the United States
  - List of the highest major summits of the United States
    - List of United States fourteeners
  - List of the most prominent summits of the United States
  - List of the most isolated major summits of the United States
  - List of extreme summits of the United States
- List of mountain ranges of the United States

==== Mountains of the United States by state or district ====
- List of hills of Alabama
- List of mountains of Alaska
  - List of mountain peaks of Alaska
- List of mountains of Arizona
  - List of mountain peaks of Arizona
    - List of mountains and hills of Arizona by height
  - List of mountain ranges of Arizona
- List of mountains of Arkansas
- List of mountains of California
  - List of mountain peaks of California
    - List of California fourteeners
  - List of mountain ranges of California
- List of mountains of Colorado
  - List of mountain peaks of Colorado
    - List of Colorado fourteeners
    - List of the highest major summits of Colorado
    - List of the major 4000-meter summits of Colorado
    - List of the most isolated major summits of Colorado
    - List of the most prominent summits of Colorado
  - List of mountain ranges of Colorado
- List of hills of Connecticut
- List of hills of Delaware
- List of hills of the District of Columbia
- List of hills of Florida
- List of mountains of Georgia
  - List of mountains in Georgia by elevation
- List of mountains of Hawaiʻi see also Oceania
  - List of mountain peaks of Hawaii
    - List of the ultra-prominent summits of Hawaii
- List of mountains of Idaho
  - List of mountain peaks of Idaho
  - List of mountain ranges in Idaho
- List of hills of Illinois
- List of hills of Indiana
- List of hills of Iowa
- List of hills of Kansas
- List of mountains of Kentucky
- List of hills of Louisiana
- List of mountains of Maine
  - List of mountains of Maine by elevation
- List of mountains of Maryland
  - List of mountains in Maryland by region
- List of mountains of Massachusetts
  - List of mountains in Massachusetts by elevation
- List of hills of Michigan
- List of mountains of Minnesota
- List of hills of Mississippi
- List of mountains of Missouri
  - List of mountain peaks of Missouri by elevation
- List of mountains of Montana
  - Lists of mountains in Montana by county
  - List of mountain peaks of Montana
  - List of mountain ranges in Montana
- List of hills of Nebraska
- List of mountains of Nevada
  - List of mountain peaks of Nevada
  - List of mountain ranges of Nevada
- List of mountains of New Hampshire
  - List of mountains of New Hampshire by elevation
- List of hills of New Jersey
- List of mountains of New Mexico
  - List of mountain peaks of New Mexico
  - List of mountain ranges of New Mexico
- List of mountains of New York
  - List of mountains of New York by region
- List of mountains of North Carolina
- List of hills of North Dakota
- List of hills of Ohio
- List of mountains of Oklahoma
- List of mountains of Oregon
  - List of mountain peaks of Oregon
  - List of mountain ranges of Oregon
- List of mountains of Pennsylvania
- List of hills of Rhode Island
- List of hills of South Carolina
- List of mountains of South Dakota
  - List of mountains in South Dakota by elevation
- List of mountains of Tennessee
- List of mountains of Texas
  - List of mountain peaks of Texas by elevation
- List of mountains of Utah
  - List of mountain peaks of Utah
  - List of mountain ranges of Utah
- List of mountains of Vermont
  - List of mountains of Vermont by elevation
- List of mountains of Virginia
  - List of mountains in Virginia by region
- List of mountains of Washington (state)
  - List of mountain peaks of Washington (state)
  - List of mountain ranges in Washington (state)
- List of mountains of West Virginia
  - List of mountains of West Virginia by elevation
- List of hills of Wisconsin
- List of mountains of Wyoming
  - List of mountain peaks of Wyoming
  - List of mountain ranges in Wyoming

=== México ===
- List of the ultra-prominent summits of Mexico
- List of mountain ranges of Mexico

=== Central America ===
- List of the ultra-prominent summits of Central America
- List of mountain ranges of Central America

==== Mountains of Central America by country ====
- List of mountains of Belize
- List of mountains of Costa Rica
- List of mountains of El Salvador
- List of mountains of Guatemala
- List of mountains of Honduras
- List of mountains of Nicaragua
- List of mountains of Panama

=== Caribbean ===
- List of the ultra-prominent summits of the Caribbean
- List of mountain ranges of the Caribbean

==== Mountains of the Caribbean by country ====
- List of mountains of the British Virgin Islands
- List of mountains of Cuba
- List of mountains of Dominica
- List of mountains of the Dominican Republic
- List of mountains of Grenada
- List of mountains of Guadeloupe
- List of mountains of Haiti
- List of mountains of Jamaica
- List of mountains of Martinique
- List of mountains of Puerto Rico
  - List of mountain ranges of Puerto Rico
- List of mountains of Saint Kitts and Nevis
- List of mountains of Saint Lucia
- List of mountains of Saint Vincent and the Grenadines
- List of mountains of Trinidad and Tobago
- List of mountains of the United States Virgin Islands

== South America ==
The standard list for the major peaks of the Andes is the list of 6000m peaks as first compiled by John Biggar in 1996 and listed in his Andes guidebook. This list currently stands at 102 peaks, with no known completers.

- List of Ultras of South America
- List of mountains in the Andes

=== Mountains of South America by country ===
- List of mountains in Argentina
- List of mountains in Bolivia
- List of mountains in Brazil
- List of mountains in Chile
- List of mountains in Colombia
- List of mountains in Ecuador
- List of mountains in Peru

== See also ==
- Lists of highest points
- Lists of volcanoes
- List of tallest mountains in the Solar System
