= List of mountains of La Gomera =

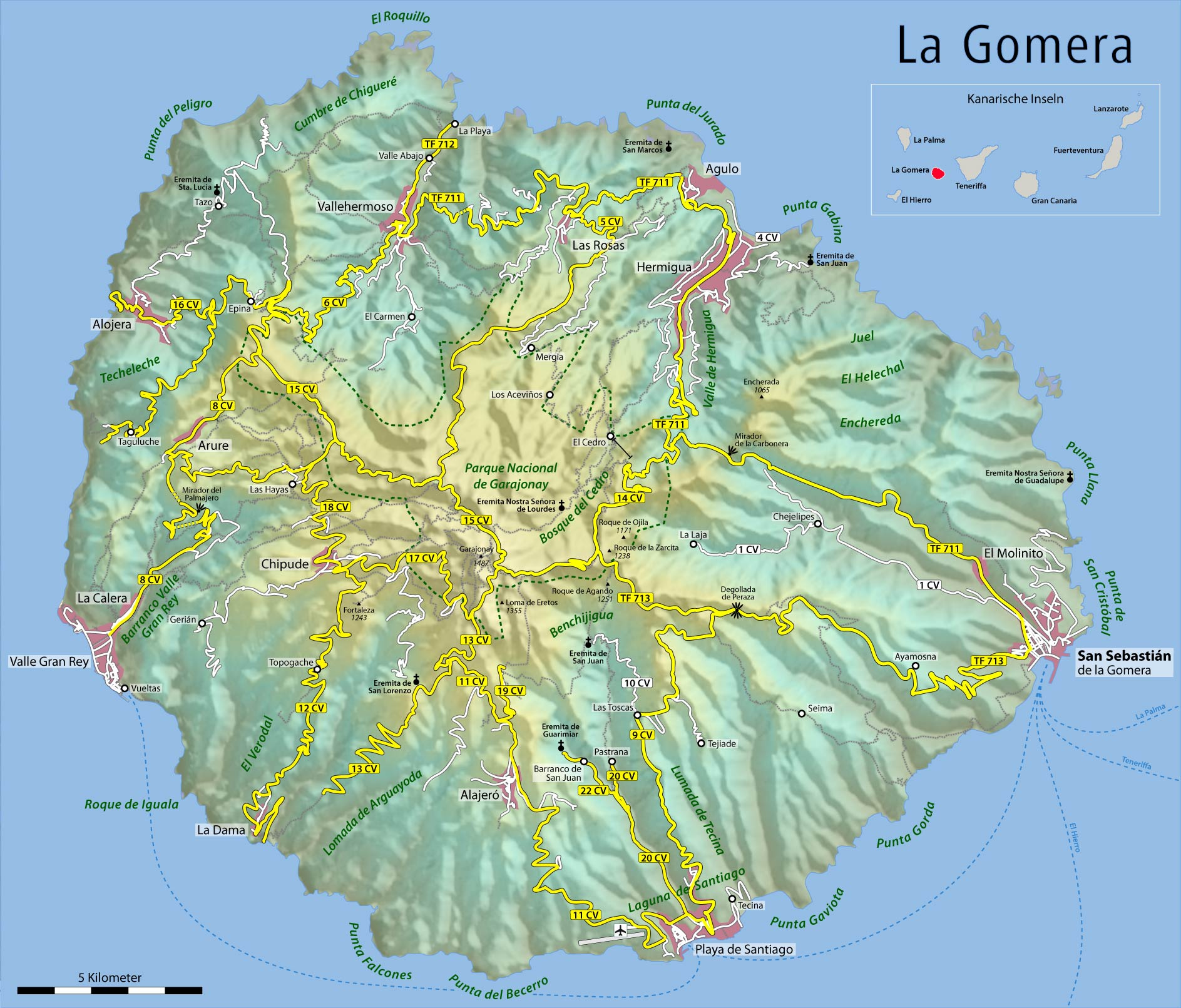

This is a list of mountains of La Gomera, it also includes hills and named rock formations. The highest mountain is Alto de Garajonay with a height of 1,487 metres (4,879 ft).

== Mountains and hills ==
Name	Height	Coordinates
Alto de Garajonay	1487 m	28°6′34.96″N 17°14′54.07″W
Eretos	1359 m	28°5′40.87″N 17°14′42.83″W
Quemado	1136 m	28°8′20.13″N 17°16′52.61″W
Araña	1107 m	28°8′47.1″N 17°17′15.94″W
La Fortaleza	1243 m	28°6′1.55″N 17°16′36.23″W
La Caldera	291 m	28°1′48.93″N 17°15′46.64″W
Montaña del Calvario	808 m	28°3′10.91″N 17°14′31.86″W
Vegavieja	867 m	28°3′47.42″N 17°14′4.21″W
Montaña de Los Cocos	1076 m	28°4′31.32″N 17°14′9″W
Tagamiche	983 m	28°5′55.96″N 17°10′42.13″W
Ayamosna	692 m	28°5′50.48″N 17°8′59.23″W
Langrero	384 m	28°5′49.29″N 17°7′48.47″W
Lomo de La Cruz	216 m	28°5′38.25″N 17°7′13.09″W
Matanza	268 m	28°6′17.63″N 17°7′12.17″W
Las Pilas	641 m	28°5′31.43″N 17°19′30.66″W
Tequergenche	497 m	28°5′4.31″N 17°19′34.05″W
Teselinde	876 m	28°11′36.8″N 17°17′20.88″W
Buenavista	615 m	28°10′35.9″N 17°15′10.56″W
Quebradón	1038 m	28°9′42.4″N 17°14′35.72″W
Risquete	557 m	28°10′59.76″N 17°11′34.04″W
Alto del Loncillo	1065 m	28°8′37.81″N 17°10′46.07″W
Jaragán	642 m	28°7′33.12″N 17°8′22.15″W
La Mérica	983 m	28°7′4.24″N 17°20′7.58″W

== Rocks ==
Name	Height	Coordinates
Roque Guará		28°6′12.18″N 17°18′34.88″W
Roque Blanco	787 m	28°7′49.44″N 17°12′16.45″W
Roque de Ojila	1168 m	28°6′50.31″N 17°12′39.77″W
Roque de La Zarcita	1234 m	28°6′42.54″N 17°12′53.45″W
Roque de Carmona	1103 m	28°6′35.89″N 17°12′46.96″W
Roque de Agando	1182 m	28°6′19″N 17°12′49.74″W
Roque de Magro	691 m	28°5′31.7″N 17°9′40.02″W
Roque del Sombrero	672 m	28°5′19.57″N 17°9′40.95″W
Roque Blanco	353 m	28°4′39.64″N 17°8′58.15″W
La Montañeta	368 m	28°4′14.55″N 17°11′12.87″W
Roque Cano	650 m	28°10′54.69″N 17°15′23.77″W
Roque Blanco	485 m	28°9′59.97″N 17°14′28.46″W
