= List of mountains in Georgia =

Georgia is an ambiguous place name; see:

- List of mountains in Georgia (U.S. state)
- List of mountains in Georgia (country)

== See also ==
- List of mountains in Georgia named Rocky Mountain
