= 2017 Gent–Wevelgem =

Cycling race

2017 UCI World Tour, race 12 of 37
- Event poster with previous winner Peter Sagan

Race details
- Dates: 26 March 2017
- Stages: 1
- Distance: 249.2 km (154.8 mi)
- Winning time: 5h 39' 05"

Results
	Winner	Greg Van Avermaet (BEL)	(BMC Racing Team)
	Second	Jens Keukeleire (BEL)	(Orica–Scott)
	Third	Peter Sagan (SVK)	(Bora–Hansgrohe)

The 2017 Gent–Wevelgem – In Flanders Fields was a Belgian road cycling one-day race that took place on 26 March over a distance of 249.2 kilometres between Deinze and Wevelgem. It was the 79th edition of Gent–Wevelgem and the twelfth event of the 2017 UCI World Tour. The winner was Greg Van Avermaet of the BMC Racing Team.

After winning E3 Harelbeke two days prior to Gent–Wevelgem, Greg Van Avermaet continued his run of good form with victory for the BMC Racing Team in a two-up sprint finish against his fellow Belgian Jens Keukeleire, riding for the Orica–Scott team. The pairing had broken away from a select group of riders in the run-in towards Wevelgem. The podium was completed by world champion Peter Sagan (Bora–Hansgrohe), as the peloton caught the select group in the closing metres.

== Route ==
The race started in Deinze in East Flanders, 20 kilometres (12 mi) from Ghent. The route took the riders immediately into West Flanders, and after around 90 kilometres (56 mi) of flat roads, they came near the coast at Veurne. After turning inland again, the race continued south towards the French border, and just after halfway, crossed onto French soil at the commune of Boeschepe, with the first of the race's ten climbs coming at the Mont des Cats. This was followed by the Kokereelberg, the Vert Mont, and the two Mont Noir ascents, via the Côte du Ravel Put and the Côte de la Blanchisserie. The riders then returned to Belgium and climbed the Baneberg, the Kemmelberg and the Monteberg.

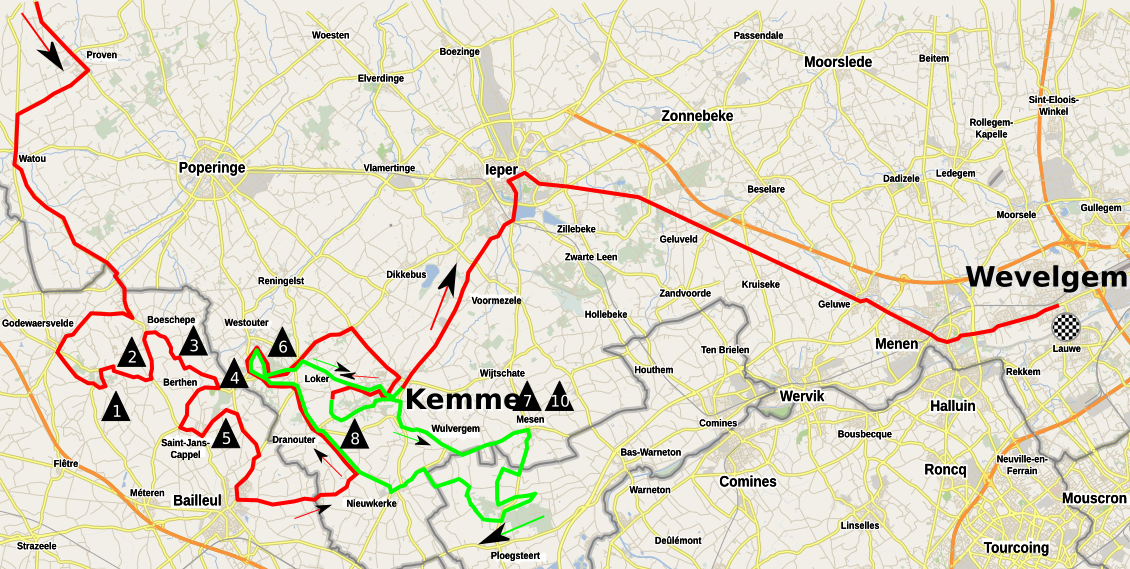
The route of the 2017 Gent–Wevelgem

There was then a flatter section, looping through Mesen, Ploegsteert and Nieuwkerke. Within this loop was an addition for the 2017 race. On 24 November 2016, it was announced that the 2017 Gent–Wevelgem would honour the victims of World War I in the Flanders region and to commemorate the Christmas truce, by incorporating three semi-paved roads at the Ploegsteert Memorial to the Missing, in Ploegsteert Wood. The final two climbs were a repeat of the Baneberg–Kemmelberg combination; at the top of the final climb, 34 kilometres (21 mi) of fairly flat roads remained to the finish in Wevelgem.

=== Categorised climbs and semi-paved roads ===
Climbs and semi-paved roads in the 2017 Gent–Wevelgem
No.	Name	Distance from		Length (metres)	Gradient (%)	
No.	Name	Start (km)	Finish (km)	Length (metres)	(ave.)	(max.)
1	Mont des Cats	135.6	113.6	500	9%	14%
2	Kokereelberg	139.1	110.1	1200	6.2%	12%
3	Vert Mont	141.4	107.8	2300	3.6%	8%
4	Mont Noir Côte du Ravel Put	143.7	105.5	2370	4.4%	13.9%
5	Mont Noir Côte de la Blanchisserie	148.9	100.3	2370	4.1%	13.9%
6	Baneberg	166.5	82.7	270	9%	13%
7	Kemmelberg Belvedère	174.5	74.7	3000	4%	22%
8	Monteberg	178.5	70.7	1000	7.3%	10%
–	Plugstreets	189.7	59.5	4700	—	
9	Baneberg	210.3	38.9	270	9%	13%
10	Kemmelberg Ossuaire	214.9	34.3	502	11.6%	22%

== Teams ==
As Gent–Wevelgem was a UCI World Tour event, all eighteen UCI WorldTeams were invited automatically and obliged to enter a team in the race. Seven UCI Professional Continental teams competed, completing the 25-team peloton. Race number 192 was unused as a mark of respect to Antoine Demoitié, who wore the number for Wanty–Groupe Gobert before his death at the 2016 edition of the race.

UCI WorldTeams

- AG2R La Mondiale
- Astana
- Bahrain–Merida
- BMC Racing Team
- Bora–Hansgrohe
- Cannondale–Drapac
- Team Dimension Data
- FDJ
- Team Katusha–Alpecin
- LottoNL–Jumbo
- Lotto–Soudal
- Movistar Team
- Orica–Scott
- Quick-Step Floors
- Team Sky
- Team Sunweb
- Trek–Segafredo
- UAE Team Emirates

UCI Professional Continental teams

- Cofidis
- Israel Cycling Academy
- Roompot–Nederlandse Loterij
- Sport Vlaanderen–Baloise
- Vérandas Willems–Crelan
- Wanty–Groupe Gobert
- WB Veranclassic Aqua Protect

== Result ==
Result
Rank	Rider	Team	Time
1	Greg Van Avermaet (BEL)	BMC Racing Team	5h 39' 05"
2	Jens Keukeleire (BEL)	Orica–Scott	+ 0"
3	Peter Sagan (SVK)	Bora–Hansgrohe	+ 6"
4	Niki Terpstra (NED)	Quick-Step Floors	+ 6"
5	John Degenkolb (GER)	Trek–Segafredo	+ 6"
6	Tom Boonen (BEL)	Quick-Step Floors	+ 6"
7	Jens Debusschere (BEL)	Lotto–Soudal	+ 6"
8	Michael Matthews (AUS)	Team Sunweb	+ 6"
9	Fernando Gaviria (COL)	Quick-Step Floors	+ 6"
10	Sacha Modolo (ITA)	UAE Team Emirates	+ 6"
