= List of mountains in Kazakhstan =

This is a list of mountains in Kazakhstan. Kazakhstan features significant mountain ranges, most notably the Tien Shan and the Altai.

== List ==
- Khan Tengri (7,010 m) - the highest point in Kazakhstan.
- Pik Talgar (4,979 m) - the highest peak of the Trans-Ili Alatau near Almaty.
- Belukha Mountain (4,506 m) - the highest peak of the Altai range on the Kazakhstan-Russia border.
- Nursultan Peak (4,330 m) - prominent in the Zailiysky Alatau range. Was known as Peak Komsomol until it was renamed in 1998.
- Sayram Peak (approx. 4,220 m) - top of the Talasky Alatau range.
- Manshuk Mametova Peak (4,194 m) - a technical peak in the Zailiysky Alatau.
- Sherkala (332 m)
- Kyzylkala
- Khan Shatyr Mountain
