= List of mountains and hills in Belgium =

Computer code

This is a list of mountains or hills in Belgium in order of height:

- Signal de Botrange (694 m)
- Weißer Stein (693 m)
- Mont Rigi (681 m)
- Baraque Michel (674 m)
- Steling (658 m)
- Baraque de Fraiture (652 m)
- Massif de Saint-Hubert (589 m)
- Plateau de Recogne-Bastogne (569m)
- Col du Rosier (556 m)
- Spiebig (550 m)
- Mont des Brumes (530 m)
- Schwirzbierg (516 m)
- Hochtumskopf (510 m)
- Côte de Stockeu (506 m)
- Croix Scaille (505 m)
- Vaalserberg (323 m)
- Côte de La Redoute (292 m)
- Croix de Charneux (269 m)
- Bovenste Bosch (235 m)
- Roche-aux-Faucons (220 m)
- Mur de Huy (204 m)
- Schaesberg (200 m)
- Col de Landelies (177 m)
- Col de la Flisme (171 m)
- La Jonquière (171 m)
- Les Gaudys (162 m)
- Sart des Roquettes (161 m)
- Mon Idée (159 m)
- Kemmelberg (159 m)
- Pottelberg (157 m)
- Charly des Bois (154 m)
- Côte de la Fontaine de Jouvence (154 m)
- Mont de Rhode (153 m)
- Mont Noir (152 m)
- Mont St-Aubert (149 m)
- Hoppeberg (148 m)
- Hotondberg (145 m)
- Mont-Saint-Aubert (145 m)
- Schapenberg (145 m)
- Mont de l'Enclus / Kluisberg (141 m)
- Baneberg (140 m)
- Côté de les Hauts (138 m)
- Vidaigneberg (136 m)
- Scherpenberg (135 m)
- Bourliquet (133 m)
- Côte de Hallembaye (133 m)
- Fortuinberg (133 m)
- Muziekberg (133 m)
- Kanarieberg (131 m)
- Rodeberg (129 m)
- Helling van Kraai (125 m)
- Galgenberg (123 m)
- Mont D'Ellezelles (122 m)
- Côte de Henripont (121 m)
- Montagne Saint-Pierre (120 m)
- Sieberg (120 m)
- Côte de la Croix-Martin (119 m)
- Boussée (118 m)
- Côte du Dieu des Monts (118 m)
- Monteberg (115 m)
- Kesterheuvel (112 m)
- La Potterée (110 m)
- Oudenberg (110 m)
- Côte de la Caillou qui Bique (106 m)
- Pellenberg (106 m)
- Côte d'Audregnies (105 m)
- Ganzenberg (105 m)
- Plachettes (105 m)
- Congoberg (100 m)
- Côté du Hrdumont (100 m)
- Côte de la Croix Jubaru (99 m)
- Côte de Boucquemont (97 m)
- Lettenberg (95 m)
- Grotenberge (88 m)
- Sulferberg (88 m)
- Boigneberg (83 m)
- Goeberg (83 m)
- Eikenberg (82 m)
- Edelareberg (80 m)
- Koppenberg (77 m)
- Wijngaardberg (72 m)
- Bolderberg (60 m)
- Kattenberg (60 m)
- Willekensberg (60 m)
- Beerzelberg (52 m)
- Wolvenberg (51 m)
- Balenberg (45 m)
- Hoge Blekker (35 m)
