= List of mountain ridges of Puerto Rico =

This is a list of Mountain Ridges in these municipalities of Puerto Rico.

- Aguada
  - Cuchilla de Juan González
- Cabo Rojo
  - La Cuchilla
- Cayey
  - Monte Llano
- Ceiba
  - Cuchilla El Duque
- Coamo
  - Cerro de la Mesa
  - Las Piedras Chiquitas
- Fajardo
  - Cuchilla Naranjo
- Guánica
  - Cerro de Abra
- Gurabo
  - Chuchilla de Hato Nuevo
- Hormigueros
  - Cuchilla Los Matos
- Juncos
  - Cuchila El Asomante
  - Cuchilla de Santa Inés
- Loíza
- Maricao
  - Chuchilla de Bucarabones
  - Cuchillas Aceitunas
- Ponce
  - Cuchilla de Monte Llano
- Utuado
  - Cuchilla Buena Vista
  - El Alto
- Yabucoa
  - Cuchilla de Panduras
- Yauco
  - Cuchilla Ranchera

== See also ==
- List of mountain ranges of Puerto Rico
- List of Puerto Rico state forests
