= Agulo =

- Municipality
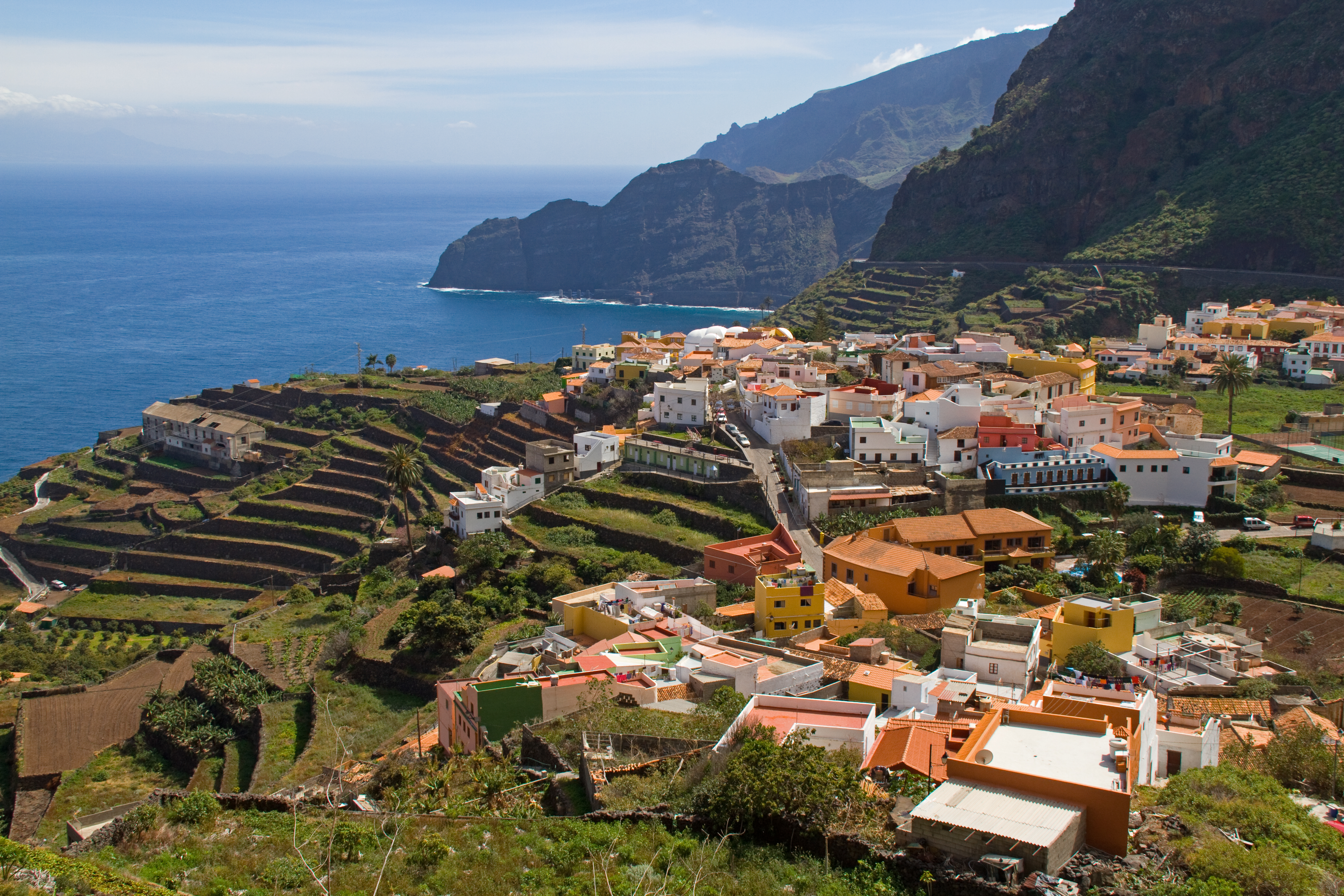
- View of Agulo

- Flag Coat of arms

- Location in La Gomera

- Location in the Canary Islands Agulo (Spain, Canary Islands)
- Coordinates: 28°11′12″N 17°11′42″W
- Country: Spain
- Autonomous community: Canary Islands
- Province: Santa Cruz de Tenerife
- Island: La Gomera

Government
  - Mayor: Néstor López Pérez

Area
  - Total: 25.39 km^{2} (9.80 sq mi)
- Elevation: 215 m (705 ft)

Population (2025-01-01)
  - Total: 1,078
  - Density: 42.46/km^{2} (110.0/sq mi)
- Demonym: Agulenses
- Postal code: E-38830

Agulo is located on the north coast of the island of La Gomera in the province of Santa Cruz de Tenerife of the Canary Islands. It is located 13 km northwest of the capital San Sebastián de la Gomera. The population was 1,100 in 2013.

== Nature and agriculture ==
Agulo is known as the "green balcony". The Meriga Forest is part of Garajonay National Park, a UNESCO World Heritage Site. The main crop cultivated are bananas.

== Subdivisions ==
- Agulo
- Lepe
- La Palmita
- Las Rosas
- Cruz de Tierno
- Juego de Bolas
- Meriga
- Pajar de Bento
- Piedra Gorda
- Serpa
- La Vega

== Gallery ==
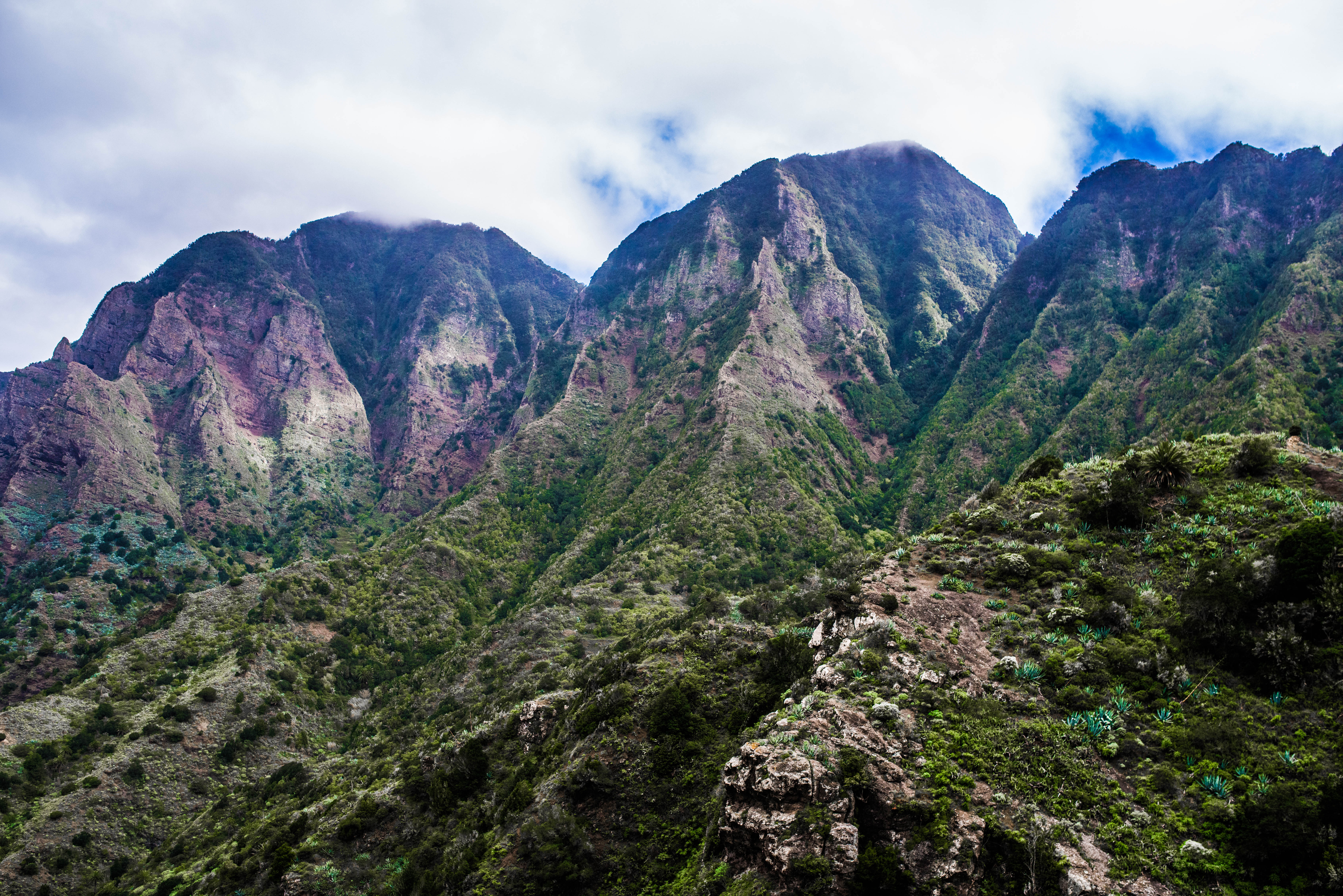
Agulo

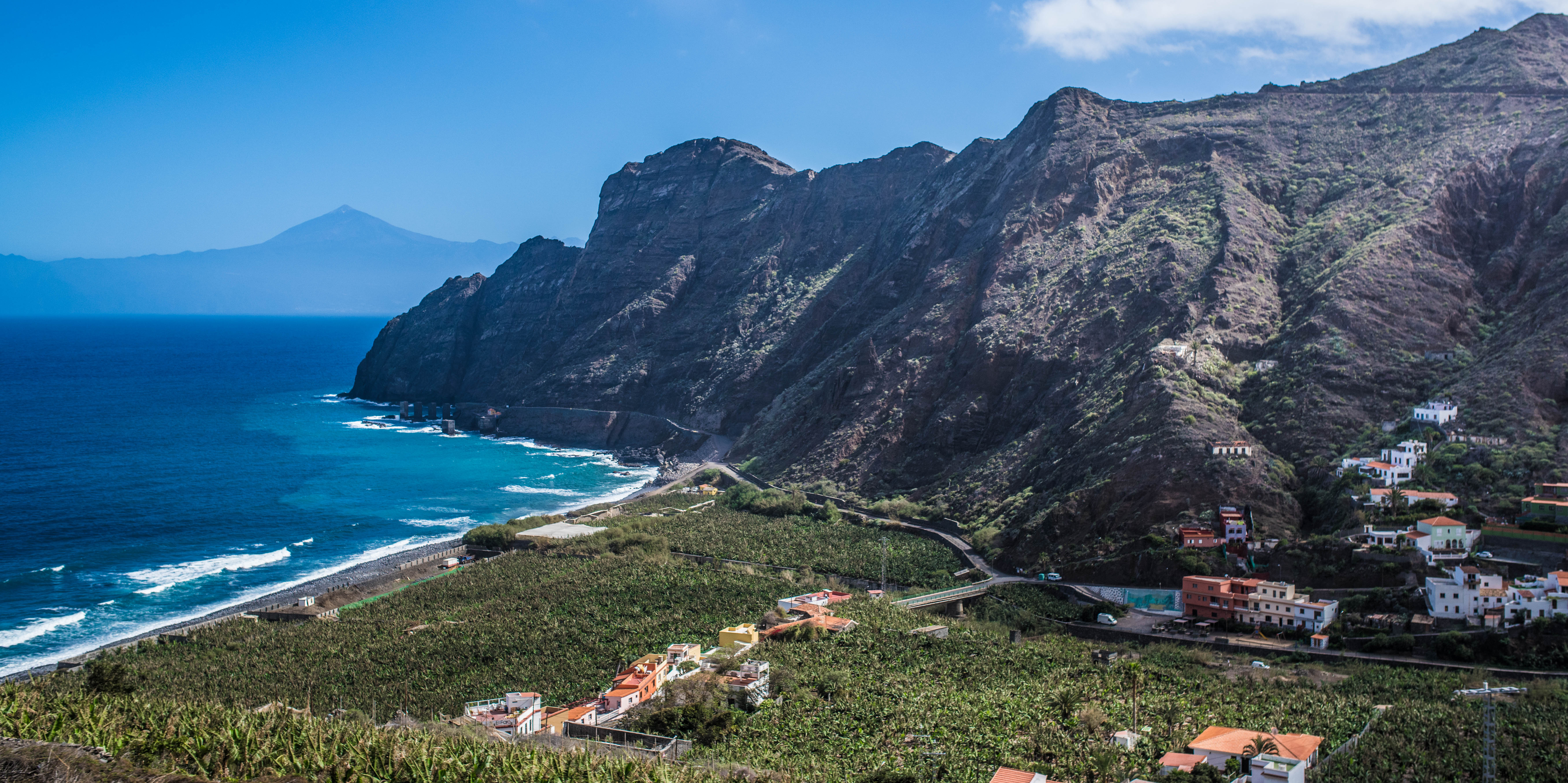
Lepe, Agulo 2017

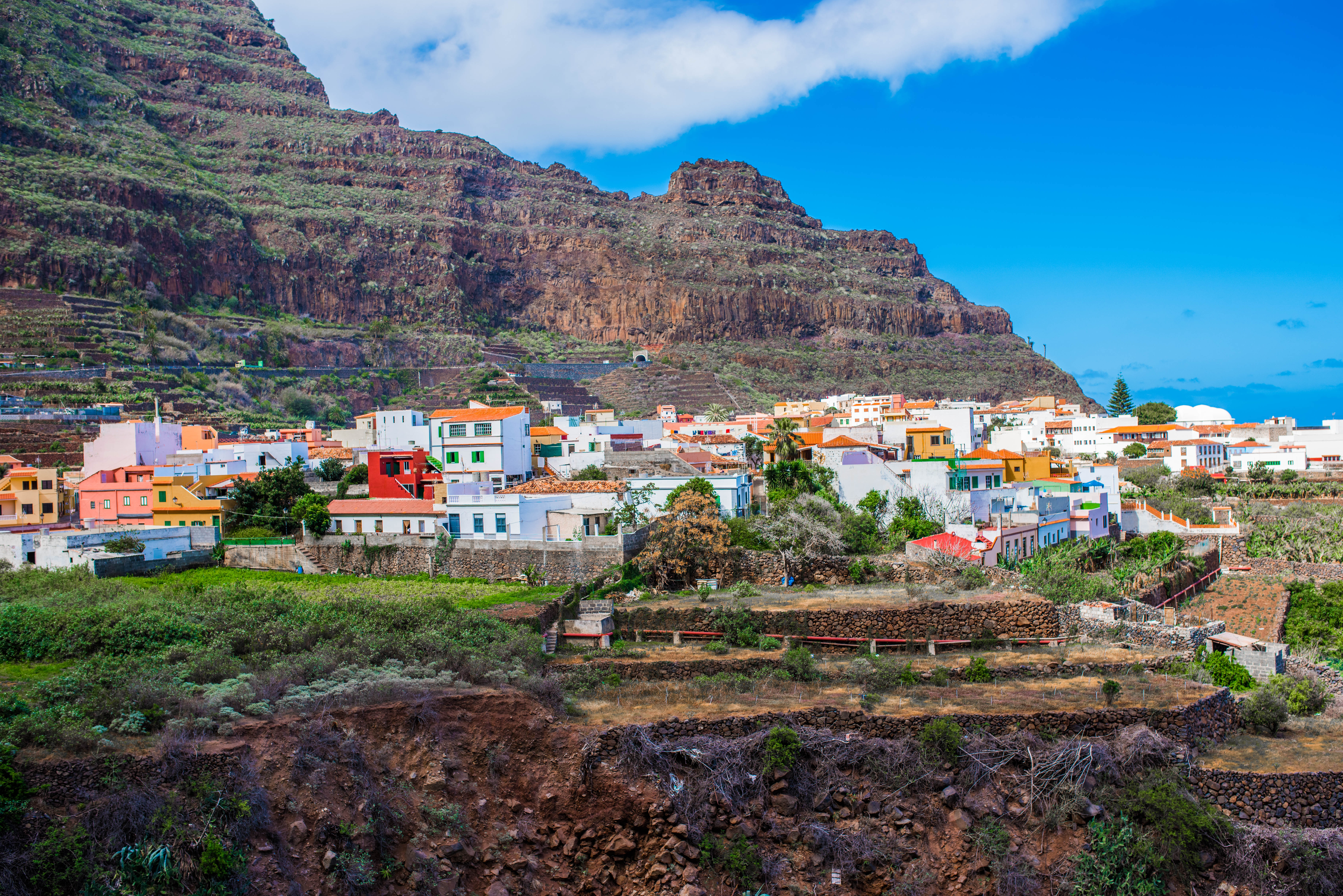
Agulo 2017

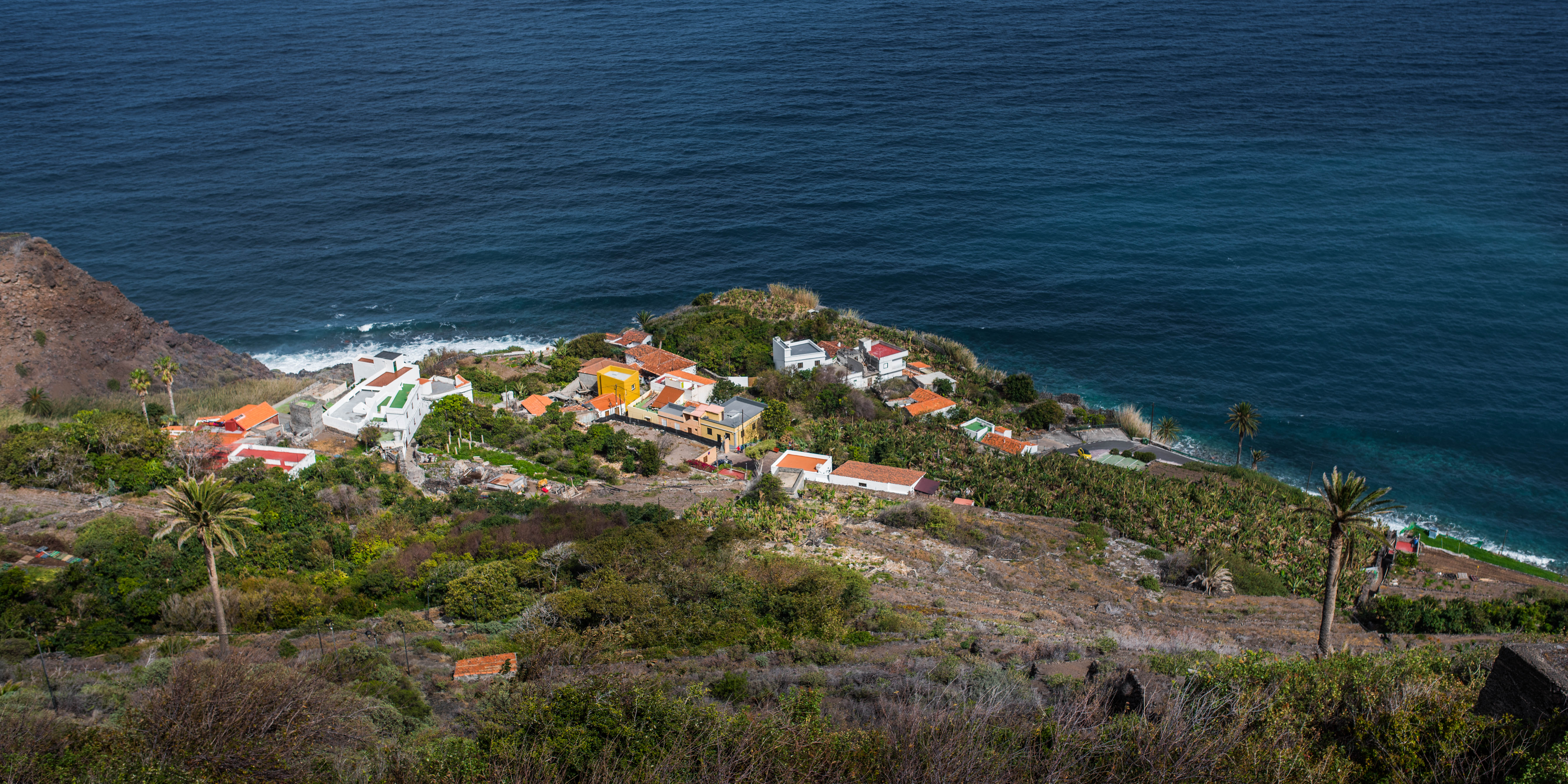
Lepe, Agulo 2017

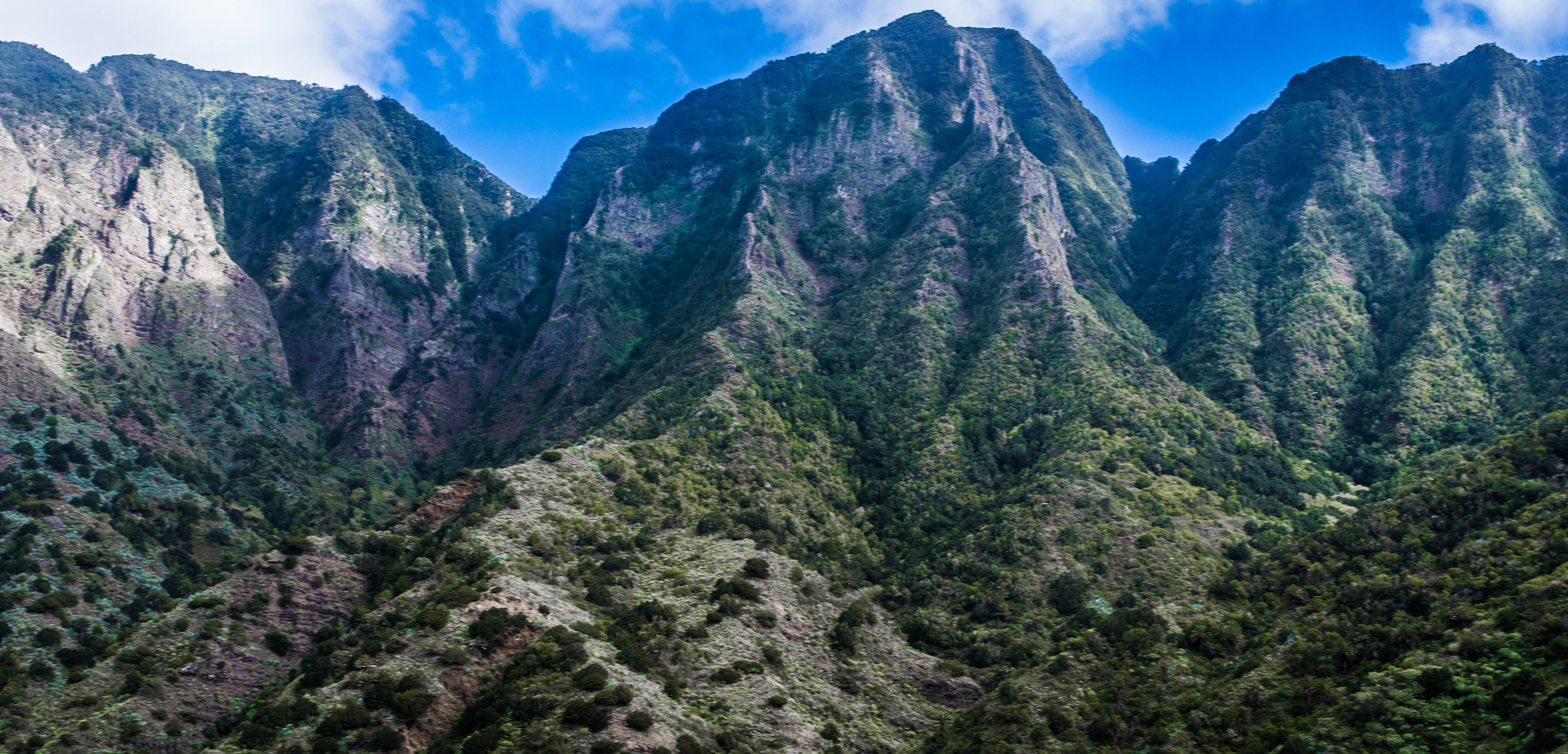
Agulo

== See also ==
- List of municipalities in Santa Cruz de Tenerife
