= List of mountains of the Central African Republic =

Mountains of the Central African Republic.

== Mountains ==
Name	Height	Prominence	Latitude	Longitude	Range	Subrange
Mont Ngaoui	4,626 ft.					
Mont Abourasséin	3,652 ft.					
Mont Dir	4,066 ft.					
Mont Gombel	4,064 ft.					
Mont Goundoungan	4,052 ft.					
Jabal Rumbukindi	3,234 ft.					
Djebel Guyamba	2,960 ft.					
Mont Balimbaye	2,727 ft.					
Mont Bai Mbia	2,275 ft.					
Mont de Kouka	2,069 ft.					
