= Mont Abourasséin =

Mountain in the Central African Republic and South Sudan

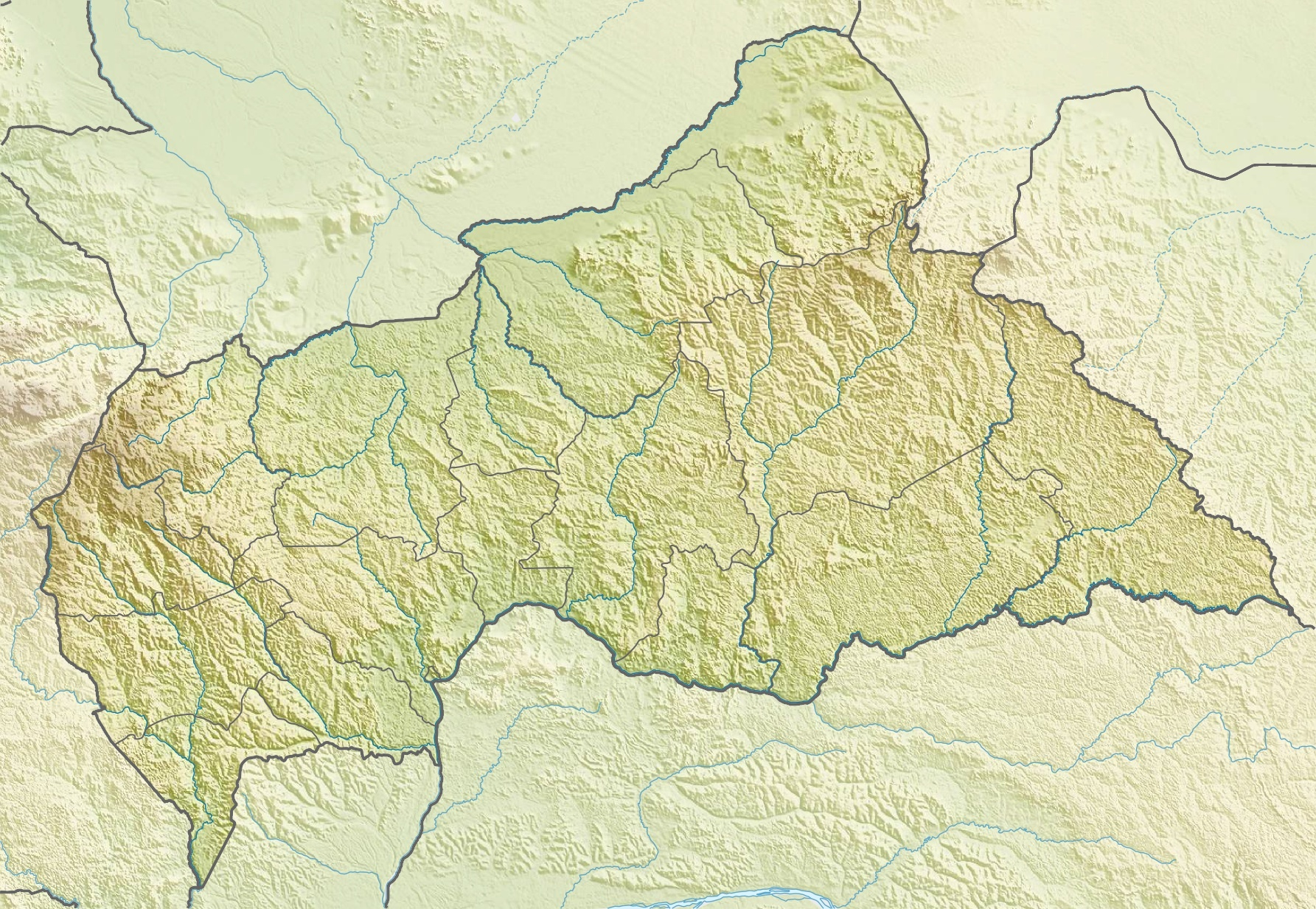
- Location within Central African Republic

Highest point
- Elevation: 1,113 m (3,652 ft)
- Coordinates: 8°36′21″N 24°16′46″E

Geography
- Location: Central African Republic – South Sudan border

Mont Abourasséin is a mountain in Central Africa. It is 1113 metres tall and stands on the international boundary between the Central African Republic and South Sudan. It is in the Haute-Kotto prefecture of the Central African Republic and the Western Bahr el Ghazal state of South Sudan.
