= Roque de Agando =

Mountain at La Gomera, Spain

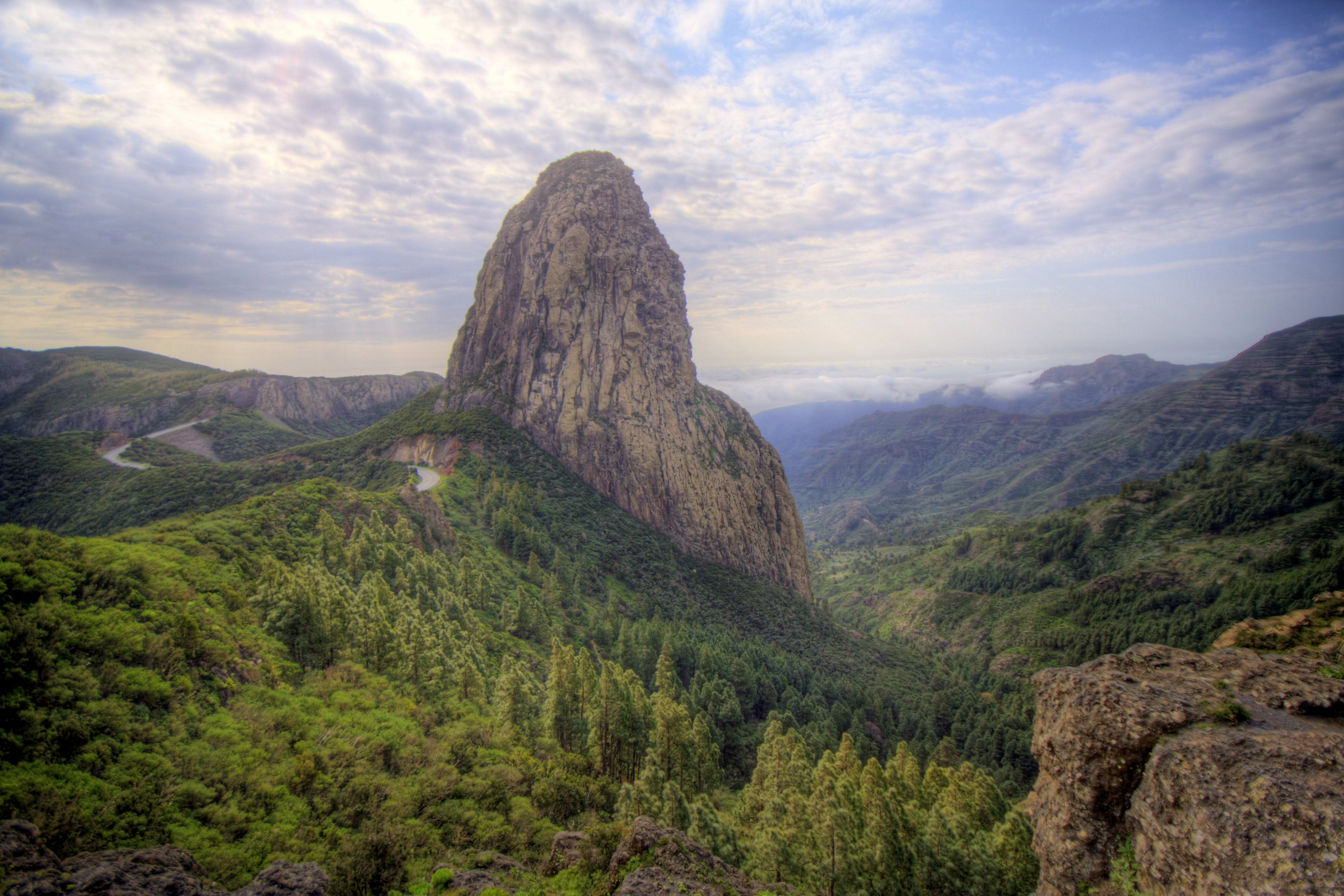

Highest point
- Elevation: 1,250 m (4,100 ft)
- Prominence: 180 m (590 ft)
- Coordinates: 28°06′19″N 17°12′49″W

Geography
- Location within Canary Islands
- Location: La Gomera, Canary Islands, Spain

Roque de Agando (commonly called Roque Agando) is a prominent rock formation on the island of La Gomera in the Canary Islands. It is one of La Gomera's most striking features and is frequently used as a symbol for the island.

Roque Agando is the most prominent of a group of volcanic plugs called simply Los Roques, near the centre of the island. The others are named Roque Ojila and Roque Zarcita, and sometimes Roque Carmona and Roque Las Lajas are also included. It rises directly above the main road between the island's capital San Sebastián and Garajonay National Park in the centre, which makes it a popular tourist sight.

The summit is not accessible by foot. During the 20th century, some easy rock-climbing routes were established on the peak, but climbing is now banned there, and hiking is restricted to established paths in its vicinity, as it forms part of a protected area.

Remains of the indigenous Guanche sacrificial shrines have been found on the summit. These were in good condition until the 1980s, when they were looted by a German group making a documentary film.
