= Khan Shatyr Mountain =

Mountain in Kazakhstan

Coordinates: 44°29′22.9″N 77°54′55.3″E

Geography
- Location: Kazakhstan, Almaty Region

Khan Shatyr Mountain (also nicknamed Genghis Khan Mountain) is located in the Western spurs of the Zhetysu (Zhungar) Alatau, Kazakhstan, which were formed during the formation of the Alpine folding. The formation of the local terrain was also influenced by the processes of ancient and modern glaciation.

== Description ==
The mountain is composed of granites, shales, limestones strongly destroyed by wind and water erosion and therefore has a flat top and gentle slopes. It immediately attracts attention not only for its pronounced shape in the form of a trapezoid, but also because there are no significant peaks near it. The surrounding area is typical of these places semi-desert with stunted vegetation that burns out in early summer. It is inhabited by various rodents – vole mice, marmots, ground squirrels, often you can see turtles and snakes. Local residents consider the mountain sacred, linking it with the name of Genghis Khan, who allegedly stopped here during a campaign in Central Asia. A more realistic version suggests that during the Kazakh – Zhungar wars, the warring parties used the mountain as an observation point, from which a good view of the surrounding area opened. And climbing up the gentle slope of the mountain to its top, which is a fairly convenient terrace, the soldiers with torches, if necessary, could give light signals from it.

== Location and visit ==
The object is located on the Almaty-Taldykorgan highway in the area of the Malaysary ridge. Favorable acoustic environment (silence, melodic sounds in nature). Recommended visiting periods: April – June; August – October.

== Local legend says ==
In 1219, Genghis Khan personally marched with all his sons and the main military forces against the state of khorezmshakhs. The conqueror's army was divided into several parts. One was commanded by his sons Chagatai and Ogedai, who had been left by their father to besiege Otrar; the other was led by his eldest son, Jochi. His main goal was to conquer Sygnak and Gend. The main forces under the leadership of Genghis Khan and his son Tolui were to capture Samarkand. General Jebe and Genghis Khan's headquarters were located near the "Khanshatyr" mountain.

== See also ==
- List of specially protected natural territories of Kazakhstan

== Sources ==
- Maryashev Monuments of Semirechye archeology and their use in excursions-Almaty, 2002
- A. P. Gorbunov Mountains Of Central Asia. Explanatory dictionary of geographical names and terms. Almaty, 2006
