= List of mountain ranges of Puerto Rico =

This is a list of massifs and mountain ranges in Puerto Rico listed alphabetically, and associated landforms.

- Cerros de San Francisco (San Francisco Hills)
- Cerros de Santini (Santini Hills)
- Cordillera Central (Puerto Rico Central mountain range)
- Cordillera Jaicoa
- Cordillera de Sabana Alta
- El Carso Norteño (Puerto Rico Northern karst region)
- El Carso Sureño (Puerto Rico Southern karst region)
- Montañas Aymamón
- Montañas de Corozal (Corozal Mountains)
- Montañas de Juan González (Juan González Mountains)
- Montañas de Uroyán (Uroyán Mountains)
- Montañas Guarionex (Guarionex Mountains)
- Sierra Bermeja
- Sierra de Cayey
- Sierra de Guardarraya
- Sierra de Jájome
- Sierra de Luquillo
- Sierra de Naranjal

== See also ==
- List of mountain ridges of Puerto Rico
- List of Puerto Rico state forests
