= List of mountains in Turkmenistan =

This is a list of mountains and mountain ranges in Turkmenistan:

- Arlan (Turkmen: Uly Balkan Gerşi)
- Aýrybaba
- Balkan Mountains – Great and Small Balkhan Ranges in Balkan Province, near the Caspian Sea (Turkmen: Balkan daglary)
- Kopet Dag Range
- Köýtendag Range
- Mount Şahşah, also known as Mount Rizeh, the highest elevation of the Kopet Dag Range (2,912 m).
