= List of mountains in Kenya =

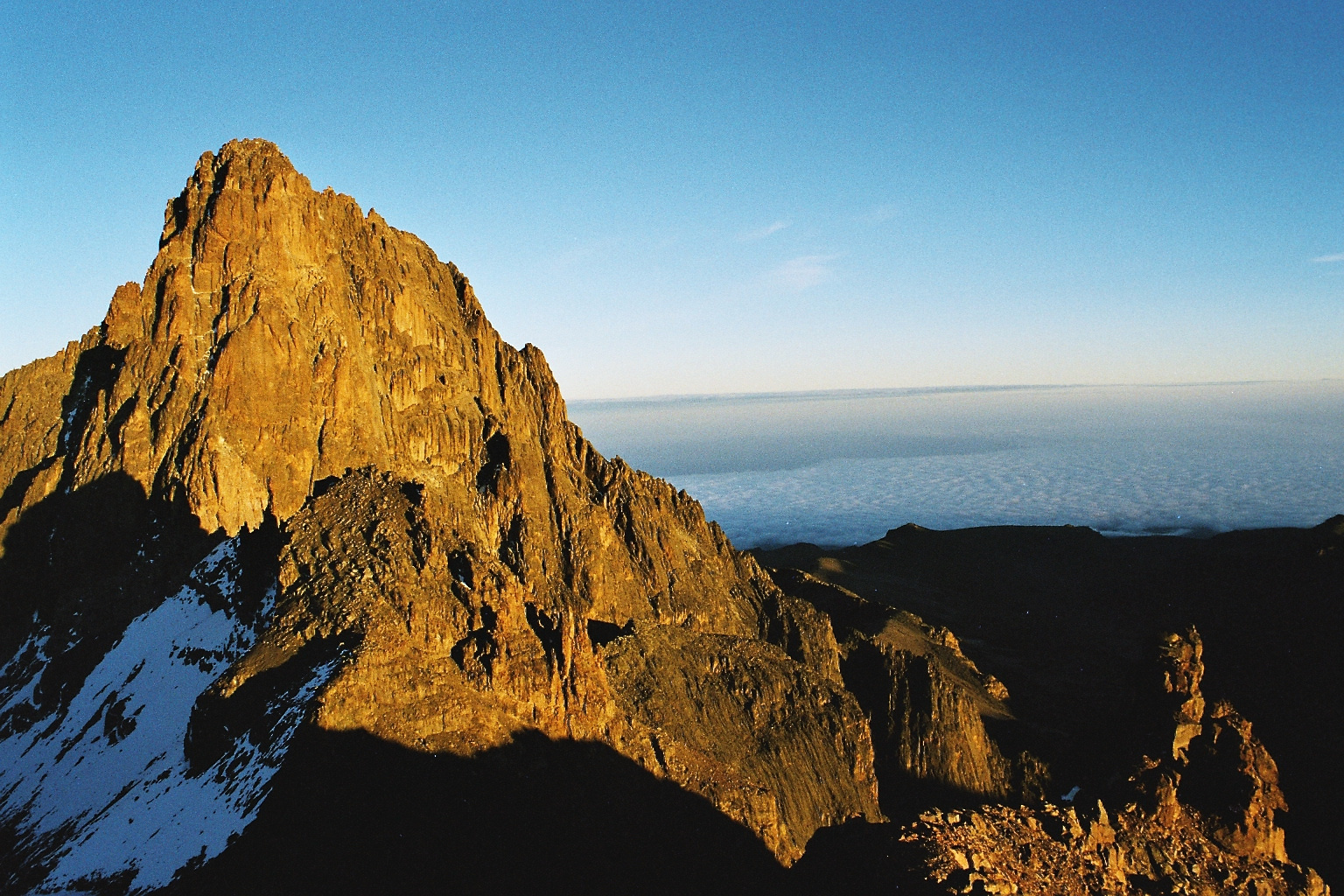
Mount Kenya

List of mountains in Kenya is a general list of mountains in Kenya with elevation. The highest mountain in Kenya, which is also the second-highest mountain in Africa, is Mount Kenya, standing at 5,199 metres (17,057 ft) tall.

Seven of Kenya's mountains, Mount Kenya, Mount Elgon, Mount Satima(Ol Doinyo Satima), Chepunyal Hills, Cherang'any Hills, Mount Kulal, and Mount Ng'iro, are among the ultra prominent peaks of Africa.

== See also ==
- Geography of Kenya
- List of Ultras of Africa
- List of mountain ranges of Kenya
- Highest mountain peaks of Africa
