= List of mountains in Georgia (country) =

This List of Mountains in Georgia names the highest mountains in Georgia, country in the western part of the Caucasus. Georgia has 2672 prominent peaks. The highest peak in the country is the Shkhara, at 5193 meters one of the country's three five-thousanders. The highest peaks in the country are in the Greater Caucasus. Another remarkable mountain is the Mtatsminda in the capital Tbilisi.

Mountain	Height in m	Coordinates	Mountain range	Administrative region	Notes
Shkhara; Georgian: შხარა	5193	43.000556°N 43.112222°E	Greater Caucasus	Samegrelo-Zemo Svaneti	Highest point in the country; Border with Russia
Janga; Georgian: ჯანღა	5051	43.01889°N 43.05671°E	Greater Caucasus	Samegrelo-Zemo Svaneti	Border with Russia
Kazbek; Georgian: მყინვარწვერი	5054	42.697350°N 44.518641°E	Greater Caucasus	Mtskheta-Mtianeti	stratovolcano; Border with Russia
Tetnuldi; Georgian: თეთნულდი	4869	43.031111°N 42.993056°E	Greater Caucasus	Samegrelo-Zemo Svaneti	Adishi Glacier
Ushba; Georgian: უშბა	4737	43.126111°N 42.653056°E	Greater Caucasus	Samegrelo-Zemo Svaneti	
Ailama; Georgian: აილამა, აჰლამა	4547	42.9572°N 43.1796°E	Greater Caucasus	Samegrelo-Zemo Svaneti	Border with Russia
Tebulosmta; Georgian: ტებულოს მთა	4493	42.573333°N 45.3175°E	Greater Caucasus	Kakheti	Border with Russia
Mtatsminda; Georgian: მთაწმინდა	727	41.695571°N 44.785246°E		Tbilisi	TV tower

== See also ==
- List of highest mountains
