= Mont Noir =

Hill on the French-Belgian border

- Zwarte Berg
- Location within France Location within Belgium

Highest point
- Elevation: 152 m (499 ft)
- Coordinates: 50.7792°N 2.7336°E

Geology
- Rock age: Eocene

Mont Noir (Zwarte Berg in Dutch) is a 152 metres (499 ft) high hill located on the French-Belgian border, a few kilometres from Bailleul. It takes its name from the presence of a high concentration of black pine woodland, which covers the hillside.

== Location ==
Three municipalities share Mont Noir; Saint-Jans-Cappel and Boeschepe, both in France, and Westouter in Belgium. The summit is located entirely in France.
