= S3 highway (Georgia) =

Trunk road in Georgia

S3
- საერთაშორისო 3
- Mtskheta-Stepantsminda-Larsi; Georgian Military Road

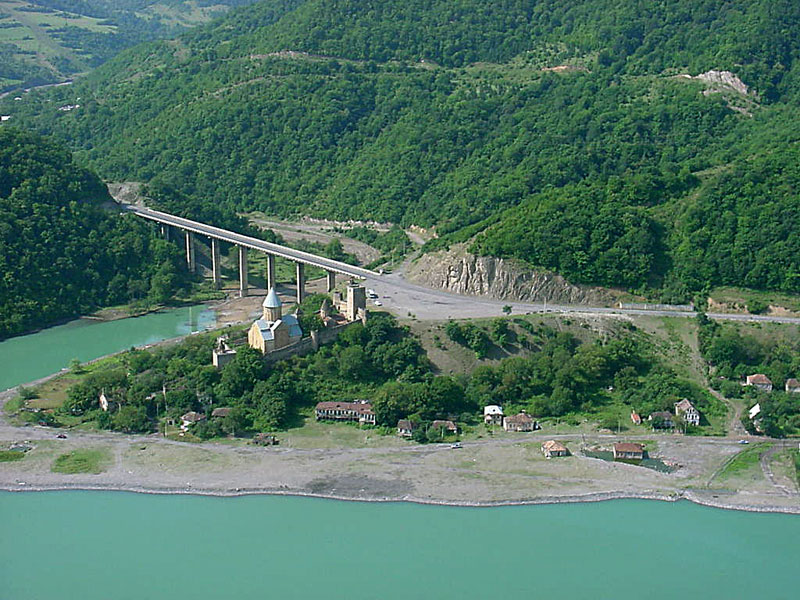
- "Military Road" near Ananuri

Route information
- Part of
- Length: 139 km (86 mi)
- Existed: 1996–present

Major junctions
- South end: Natakhtari (Mtskheta)
- 26 Sh26 to Tianeti / Shatili
- North end: Larsi (Russia)

Location
- Georgia
- Municipalities: Mtskheta, Dusheti, Kazbegi

Highway system
- Roads in Georgia; International Routes; National Routes

The Georgian S3 route (Georgian: საერთაშორისო მნიშვნელობის გზა ს3, Saertashoriso mnishvnelobis gza S3, road of international importance), also known as Mtskheta-Stepantsminda-Larsi (Georgia–Russia border) or Georgian Military Road, is a "road of international importance" within the Georgian road network and runs from Mtskheta to the border with Russia near Stepantsminda with a length of 139 kilometres (86 mi). After crossing the Georgian-Russian border, the highway continues as A161 to Vladikavkaz, the capital of Russia's North Ossetia–Alania federal republic. The highway is the only open land route between Russia and Georgia, while routes via Georgian breakaways South Ossetia and Abkhazia are effectively closed for through traffic (and only facilitate traffic between the breakaways and Russia).

The S3 highway is entirely part of the European E117 and Asian AH81 routes and connects with the Georgian S1 highway at its southern terminus near Mtskheta. Furthermore, the highway is located in the Mtskheta-Mtianeti region and passes through Zhinvali, Ananuri, Pasanauri, and Gudauri where it reaches its highest point, the Jvari Pass at 2,379 metres (7,805 ft). It was built as a two lane road, but designs have been developed to upgrade the southern part of the S3 between Natakhtari and Zhinvali to a two-by-two motorway (or dual carriageway) as a northern extension of the S9 Tbilisi Bypass. A 23-kilometre (14 mi) bypass of the Jvari Pass, prone to heavy snowfall and disruption of commercial cross-border traffic, has been under construction since 2021 with a 9-kilometre-long (5.6 mi) tunnel, the longest in the region.

== Background ==
The route of the S3 follows the historic Georgian Military Road, which goes back many centuries. For a long time it was the only suitable way to pass the central section of the Caucasus Mountains, while the deep Darial Gorge at the Georgia–Russia border acted as a natural gate for anyone who wanted to pass the mountains, especially from the north. The route was also used by the Russian military to expand its control into Transcaucasia after the Kingdom of Georgia became a protectorate of the Russian Empire in 1783.

Since 1960, the current S3 was one of 37 listed routes in the Soviet Union, as main road 16 between Beslan and Yerevan via Tbilisi. In the early 1980s, the Soviet road numbering system was overhauled and the Georgian Military Road became part of the A-301 between Tbilisi (Natakhtari junction with M-27, the current S1) and Beslan. After Georgia regained independence in 1991, the A-301 designation was maintained until 1996 when the current route numbering system was adopted. In that year the "roads of international importance" (S-)category was introduced and the "S3 Mtskheta-Stepantsminda-Larsi (Georgia–Russia border)" replaced the A-301 designation.

The S3 is the only direct road between centrally controlled Georgia and Russia, and is a crucial overland trunk route between Armenia and Russia as well. Between 2006 and 2010, the Larsi border crossing at the northern terminus of the S3 was closed by Russia in response to policies of the Saakashvili administration at the time, and no overland traffic between Georgia and Russia was possible at all, seriously affecting Armenia, which relies on trade with Russia. At the instigation of Armenia, the border crossing reopened in March 2010.

The upper parts of the highway in the Caucasus Mountains are prone to landslides and heavy snow, which lead to frequent road closures and long (truck) queues. This has led to initiatives by Armenia and Russia to move Georgia to facilitate other available overland routes via its breakaways South Ossetia (Roki Tunnel) and Abkhazia to spread traffic and liability to delays. These initiatives have not brought any concrete progress. Instead, Georgia has begun to upgrade the most sensitive parts of the Georgian Military Road. Near the Russian border, a new 2-kilometre (1.2 mi) tunnel has been built to address the impact of landslides. This was spurred after two massive landslides in 2014 which killed 7 people, heavily damaged the Georgian border checkpoint, and blocked traffic for nearly two months in total.

== Gudauri tunnel bypass ==
The bypass of Gudauri

In 2021, as part of the North-South Corridor project upgrading the Armenia–Russia route, the construction of a 23-kilometre-long (14 mi) bypass of ski resort Gudauri was started, between Kvesheti and Kobi. The bypass intends to avoid not only the ski resort, but also the 2,379-metre-high (7,805 ft) Jvari Pass, which is prone to heavy snowfall and disruption for commercial cross-border traffic. It will be routed through the Khada Valley and will consist of a two-lane road plus a separate uphill lane for heavy traffic (2+1) and a 9.06-kilometre (5.63 mi) tunnel through the Sadzele Mountain, the longest in the Caucasus region.

Kvesheti is at an altitude of 1,380 metres (4,530 ft) while Kobi is at 1,970 metres (6,460 ft), which will then become the highest point on the road. The vertical difference of 600 metres (2,000 ft) will mainly be overcome at Kvesheti and in the Khada valley. The south portal of the tunnel will be at approximately 1,800 metres (5,900 ft) above sea level, while the north portal at Kobi will be at approximately 1,970 metres (6,460 ft). The passage through the mountain reduces a major climb and descent of 400 metres (1,300 ft) from the route. Apart from the long tunnel, the bypass will feature four smaller tunnels and six bridges, including a 426-metre (1,398 ft) landmark arch bridge and a height of 176 metres (577 ft) spanning the Khada Valley and Khadistskali River.

The tunnel drilling started in 2021 and was done with a tunnel boring machine from China. The cost of the project is $558.6 million and is financed by the Asian Development Bank and the European Bank for Reconstruction and Development (EBRD), with additional state budget funding from the Georgian government.

Lot	Section	Length	Funding	Contractor	Start Construction	Finished / Opened	Remarks
1	Kobi - Tskere	10 km; 6.2 mi	$415m ADB $60m EBRD $84m State budget	China Railway Tunnel Group Co (CRTG)	2021		including 9-kilometre (5.6 mi) tunnel
2	Tskere - Kvesheti	12.7 km; 7.9 mi	$415m ADB $60m EBRD $84m State budget	China Railway 23rd Bureau Group CO. Ltd (CRCC)	2021		section through Khada Valley, including 4 tunnels (2.5 km; 1.6 mi) and 6 bridges (1.5 km; 0.93 mi)
1.000 km = 0.621 mi: Under construction

== Future ==
Financed by the Asian Development Bank, feasibility and design studies were finalized in 2020 for a realignment of 27 kilometres (17 mi) of the southern part of the S3 between Natakhtari and Zhinvali on the left bank of the Aragvi river as a two-by-two motorway (or dual carriageway).

== Route ==
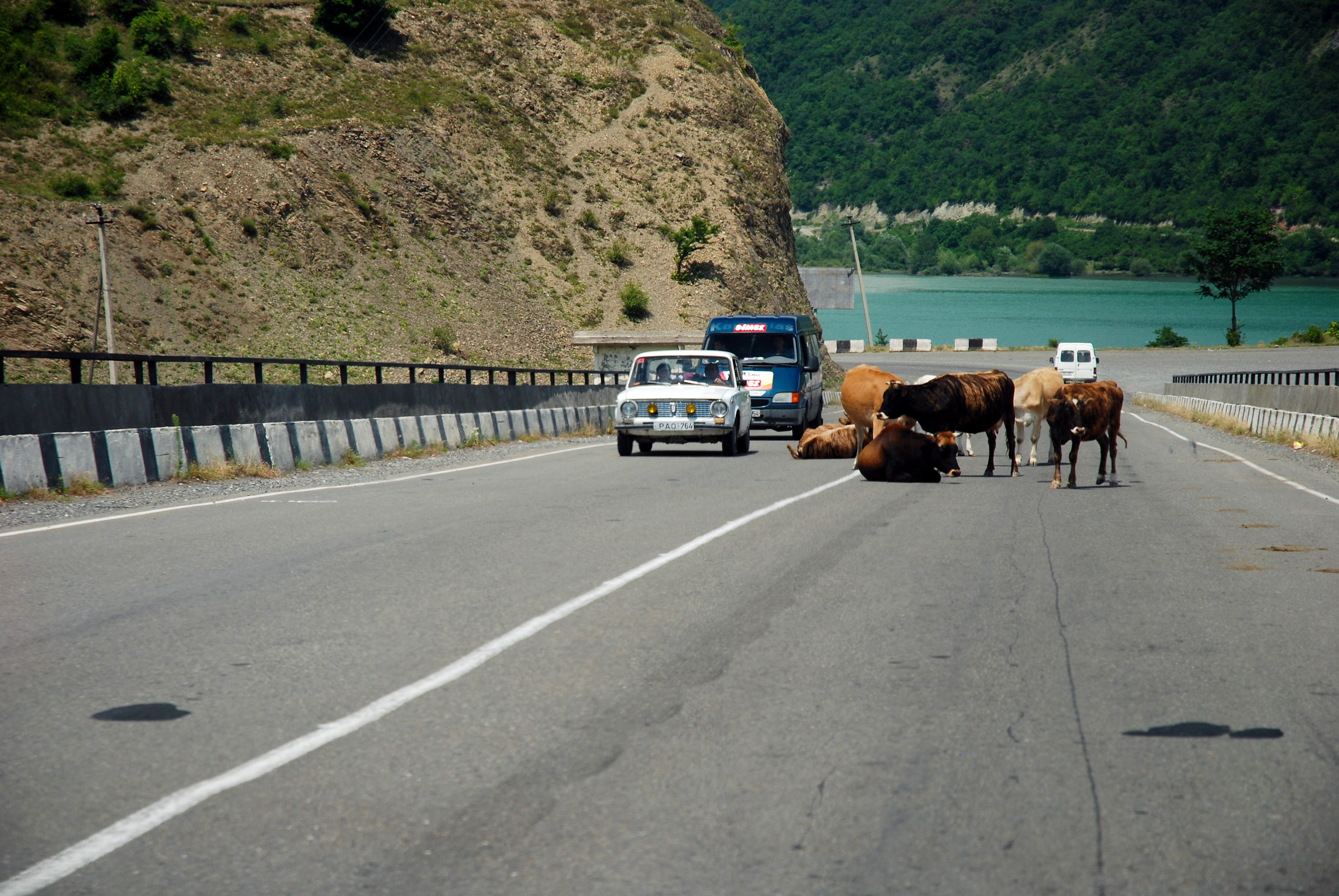
S3 highway at Ananuri Castle

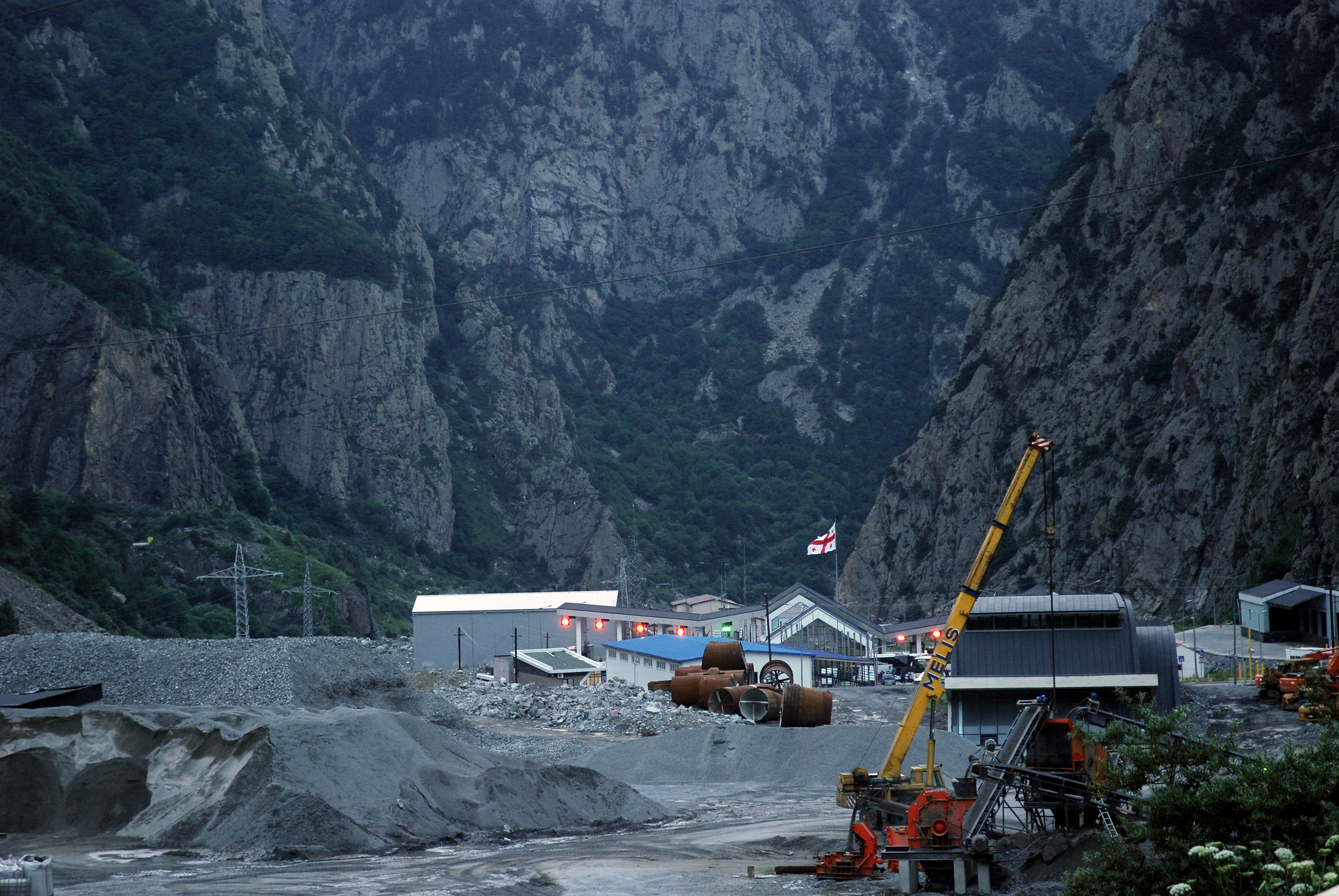
North terminus S3: Zemo Larsi border checkpoint in Dariali Gorge

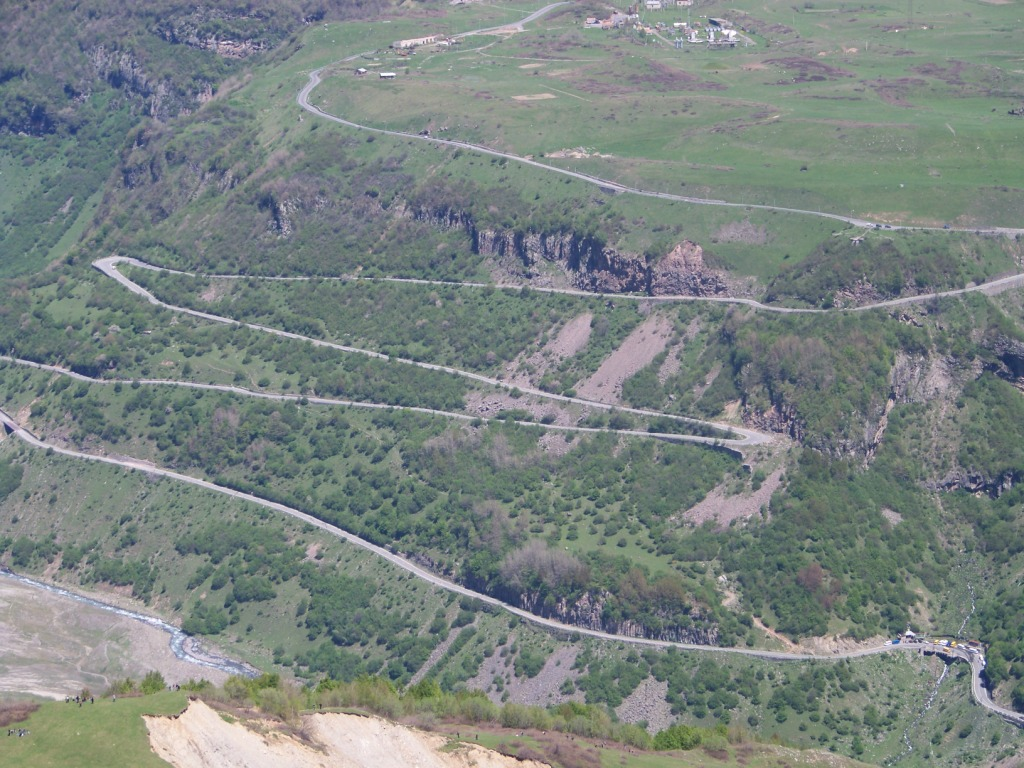
S3 near Gudauri

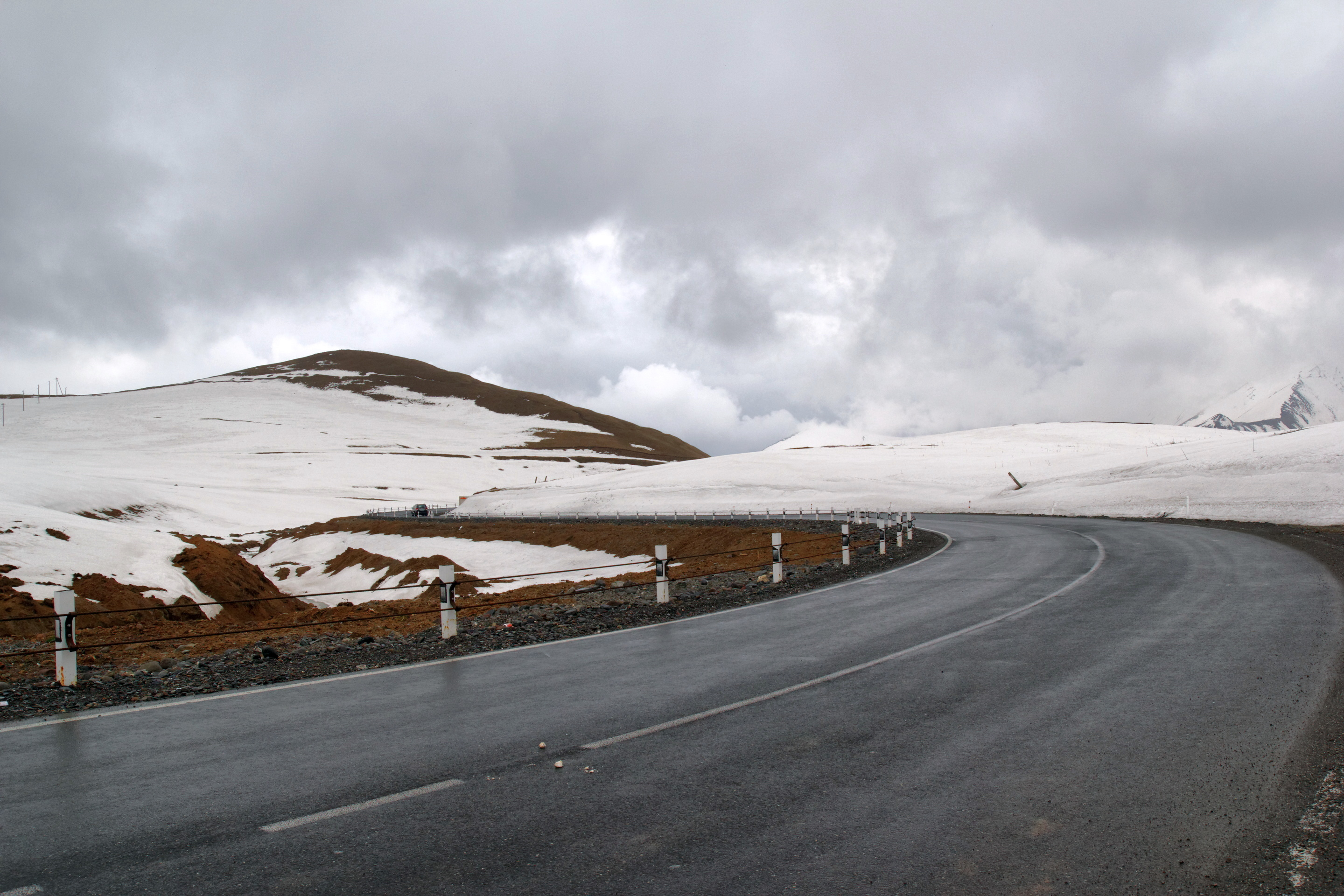
Jvari Pass

The S3 highway branches off the S1 highway just north of Tbilisi and runs north through the rather flat Aragvi river valley; after a few kilometres, the road gets penned in by the mountains while the Aragvi valley continues on a slight incline until Zhinvali while passing through various villages with many local businesses. Zhinvali is a crosspoint for important state routes: the Sh26 to Shatili at the Russian border and the Sh27 to Tianeti. The latter branches off the Sh26 just outside of Zhinvali and offers a northern route to the Kakheti region. Both state routes have been rehabilitated in recent years. From Zhinvali, the S3 highway continues along the western arm of its namesake reservoir. From this point the Aragvi river valley turns into a gorge. After Kvesheti, the starting point of the Gudauri Bypass, the road begins its climb to the Jvari pass via the Gudauri ski resort. In just 25 kilometres (16 mi), the road climbs more than 1000 m (3300 ft) in altitude to 2379 m (7805 ft).

The Jvari Pass is part of the north–south watershed of the Caucasus Mountains which separates the Aragvi and Terek river basins. On the north side of the pass, the Georgian Military Highway gradually descends to Kobi, where the new Gudauri Bypass will join the S3 at an altitude of 1970 m (6460 ft). At Kobi, the highway joins the Terek River, which runs through the Dariali Gorge to Russia. Via a few small villages, the highway reaches Stepantsminda, the administrative center of Kazbegi Municipality and the site of the iconic Gergeti Trinity Church, which looms over the Georgian Military Road from above. For many overland travelers, it is the first stop in Georgia when coming from Russia.

Between Kobi and Stepantsminda, the Terek river valley is relatively wide, but north of Stepantsminda, the mountains close in, culminating in the Dariali Gorge near the Georgian–Russian border. Here, a new 2-kilometre-long (1.2 mi) tunnel was built in 2018 to protect the road against landslides and avalanches. On other spots, avalanche galleries have been constructed as well. The Georgian Kazbegi border checkpoint is located at an altitude of 1260 m (4130 ft) above sea level near the actual border, while the Russian Verkhniy Lars checkpoint is 3 kilometres (1.9 mi) further downstream the Terek River due to the geography. The road continues as A161 to Vladikavkaz, the capital of the Russian federal republic North Ossetia–Alania.

== Intersections ==
The entire route is in Mtskheta-Mtianeti region and overlaps with E117 and AH81. The AH81 has its western terminus at the Georgian-Russian border

Municipality	km	mi		Destinations	Route	Notes
Mtskheta	0	0.0	Interchange	Tbilisi / Tsiteli Khidi (Red Bridge) Gori / Sokhumi	S1 highway (Georgia) European route E60 European route E117 AH5 AH81	Highway to (Russia) via Zugdidi and Sokhumi
Mtskheta	3	1.9	Left junction	Dzalisi	Roads in Georgia (country)	
Dusheti	16	9.9	Left junction	Sashaburo	Roads in Georgia (country)	
Dusheti	20	12	Left junction	Dusheti	Roads in Georgia (country)	
Dusheti	25	16	Junction	Bichnigauri		
Dusheti	26	16	Right junction	Tianeti / Shatili	Roads in Georgia (country)	
Dusheti	37	23	Crosses Arkala River (Ananuri Bridge 240 m)			
Dusheti	37	23	Ananuri Castle on right side next to Ananuri Bridge and S3 highway			
Dusheti	56	35	Bibiliani Bridge 85 m			
Dusheti	80	50	Crosses (Mtiuleti) Aragvi River (155 m)			
Kazbegi	98	61	Russia–Georgia Friendship Monument			
Kazbegi	100	62	Jvari Pass (2379 m (7805 ft))			
Kazbegi	107	66	Crosses Baidara River			
Kazbegi	108	67	Crosses Baidara River			
Kazbegi	109	68	Crosses Narvani River			
Kazbegi	121	75	Right junction	Sno / Juta	Roads in Georgia (country)	
Kazbegi	126	78	Crosses Terek River			
Kazbegi	127	79	Left junction	Gergeti Trinity Church	Roads in Georgia (country)	
Kazbegi	130	81	Tunnel (750 m)			
Kazbegi	134	83	Crosses Terek River (90 m)			
Kazbegi	135	84	Tunnel (1700 m)			
Kazbegi	137	85	(Georgia (country)) Kazbegi Georgian border checkpoint			
Kazbegi	138	86	Georgia–Russia border			
Kazbegi	141	88	(Russia) Verkhny Lars Russian border checkpoint. Road continues as to Vladikavkaz			
1.000 mi = 1.609 km; 1.000 km = 0.621 mi
