= Ingush raids on Georgian military road =

Ingush raids on Daryal Gorge
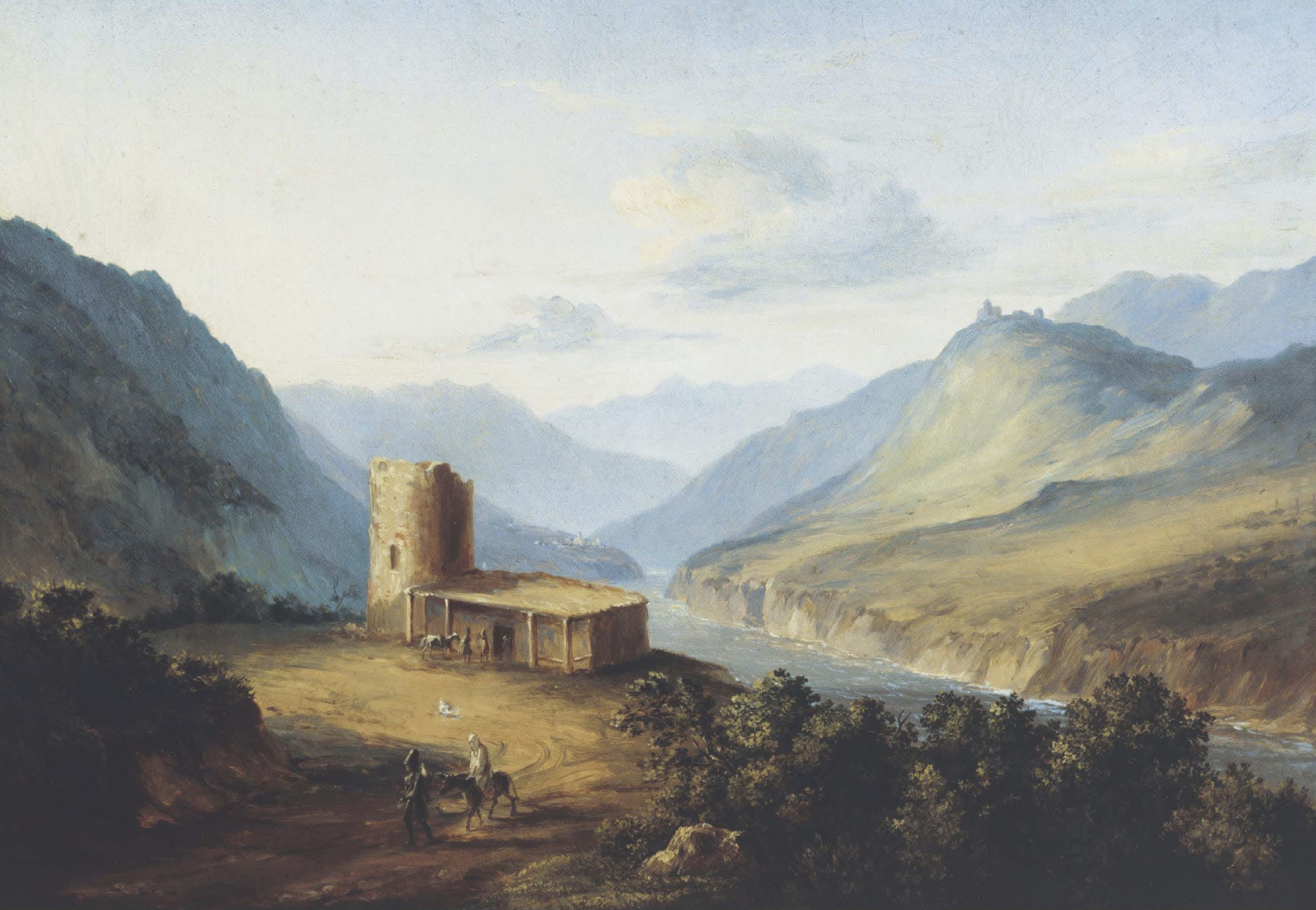
- Paintings by Mikhail Lermontov, Darial Gorge (Georgian Military road)
Date	18th century
Location	Ingushetia
Result	Ingush victory: The Russian Empire strengthened its military presence in the region as a result of the raids.

Belligerents
Russian Empire	(Ingushetia) Ingush

Commanders and leaders
(Russian Empire) Konstantinov †	unknown

Strength
unknown	unknown

Casualties and losses
unknown	unknown

The Georgian Military Highway was an important transport artery linking Russia with Transcaucasia. The road passed through areas populated by Ingush, which made it a target for attacks.

The Ingush raids on the road were well organized and directed against military columns and caravans.

== Raids ==
The Ingush, like other mountain peoples of the Caucasus, maintained a semi-independent way of life. They defended their lands from external interference and used raids as a form of protest against the militarization of the region and the forced integration into the Russian Empire. The Georgian Military Road, as a symbol of imperial control, often became a target of attack.

- Here is another excerpt from Baron Rosen’s report:

There is one interesting case known about the Ingush, when in June-July 1832, not wanting to submit to the "Russian protégé", they killed the bailiff Konstantinov and two missionaries with him, and they themselves hid in the mountains. From the report of Baron Rosen dated July 21, 1832, it is known that he twice sent people to the Ingush with the order to pay a fine and hand over those guilty of Konstantinov's death, and if the Ingush promised to think about it the first time, then the second time they refused. Hiding in their mountains, the Ingush periodically entered into battle with the enemy and made raids on the Georgian Military Road
