= Georgian Military Road =

Road in Georgia and Russia

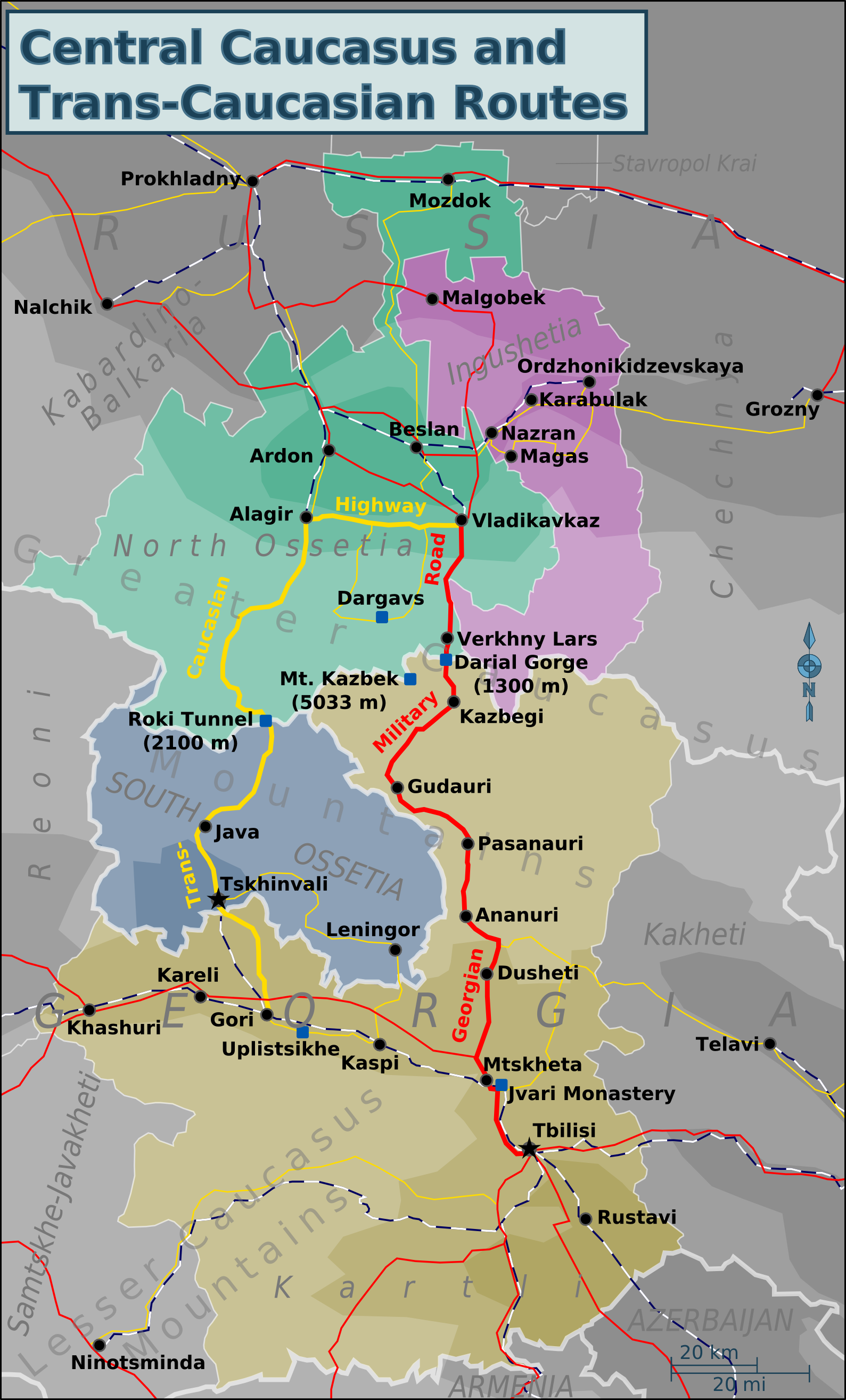
Map of the area.

The Georgian Military Road or Georgian Military Highway (Note: Georgian: საქართველოს სამხედრო გზა; Ingush: ГIалгIай никъ, romanized: Ghalghai niqh, Гуржий никъ, romanized: Gurzhiy niqh; Russian: Военно-Грузинская дорога, romanized: Voyenno-Gruzinskaya doroga; Ossetian: Арвыкомы фæндаг, romanized: Arvykomy fændag) is the historic name for a major route through the Caucasus from Georgia to Russia. Alternative routes across the mountains include the Ossetian Military Road and the Transcaucasian Highway.

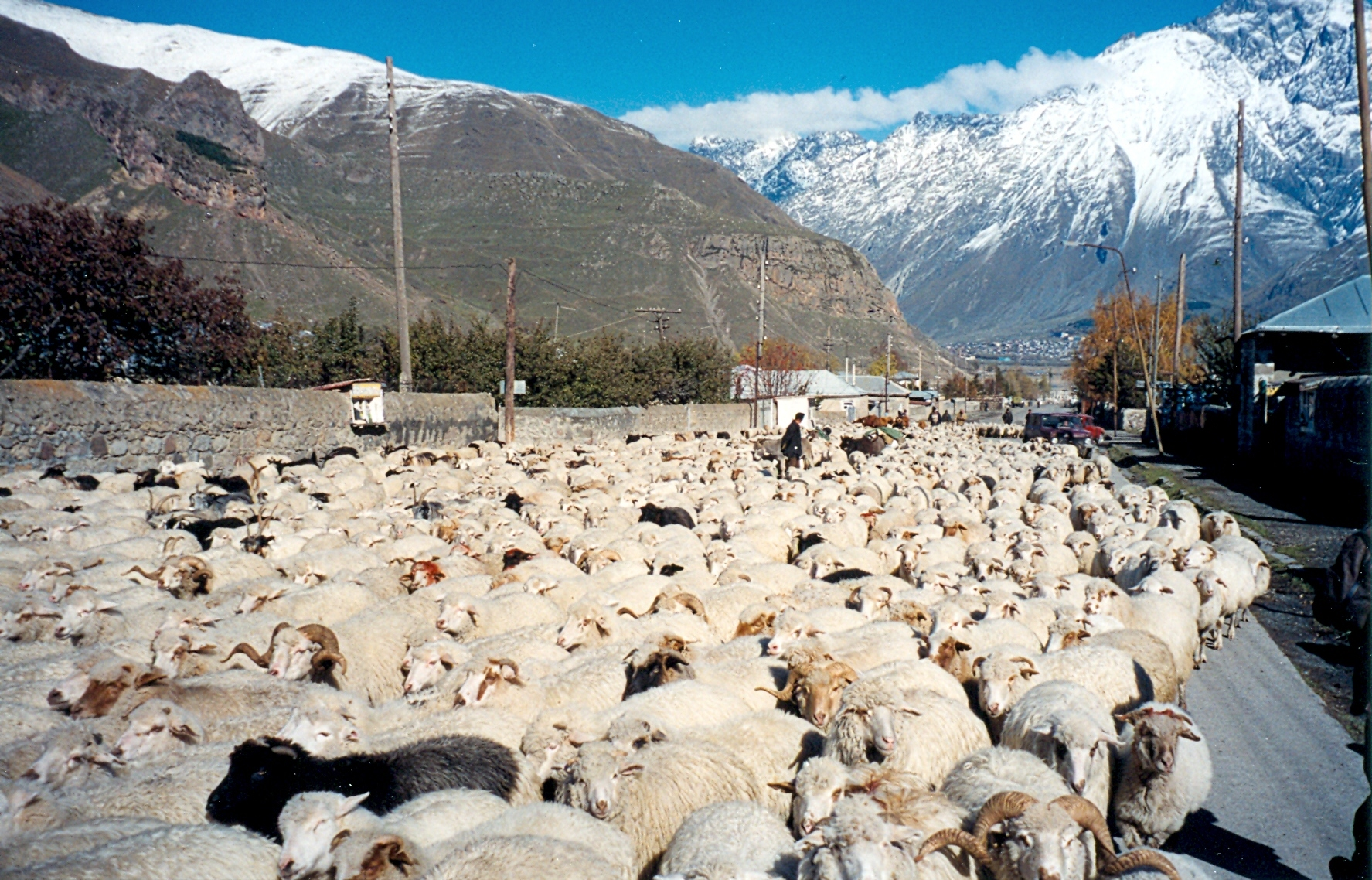
Traveling northbound along the Georgian Military Road.

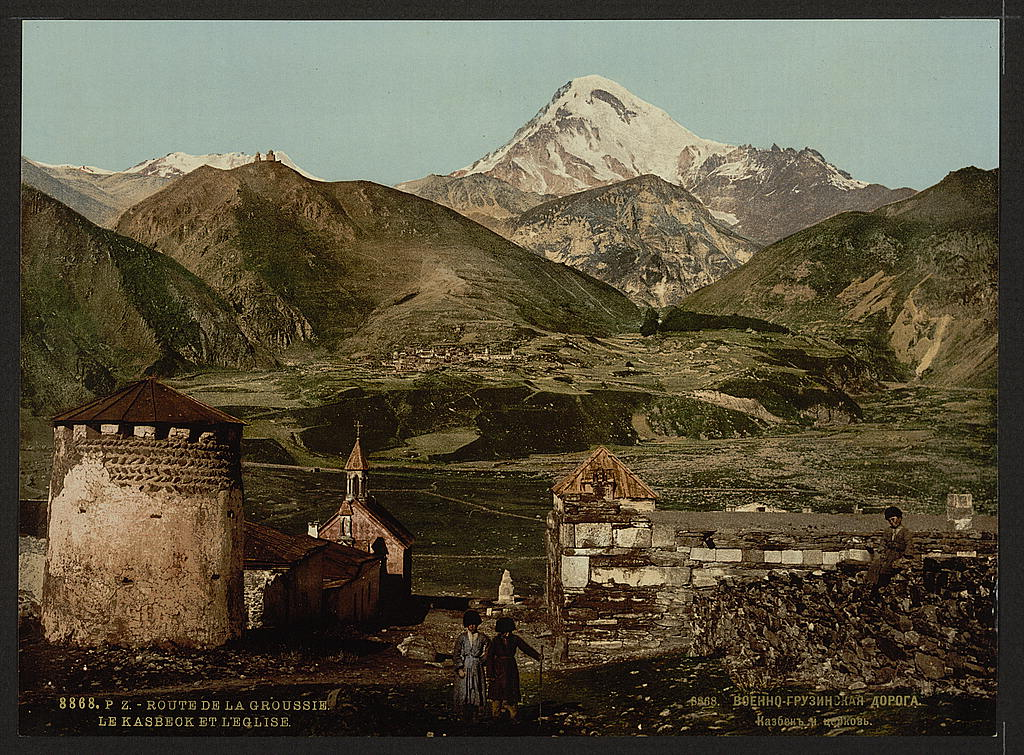
The road is featured in several famous novels, notably A Hero of Our Time and Twelve Chairs.

== Route ==
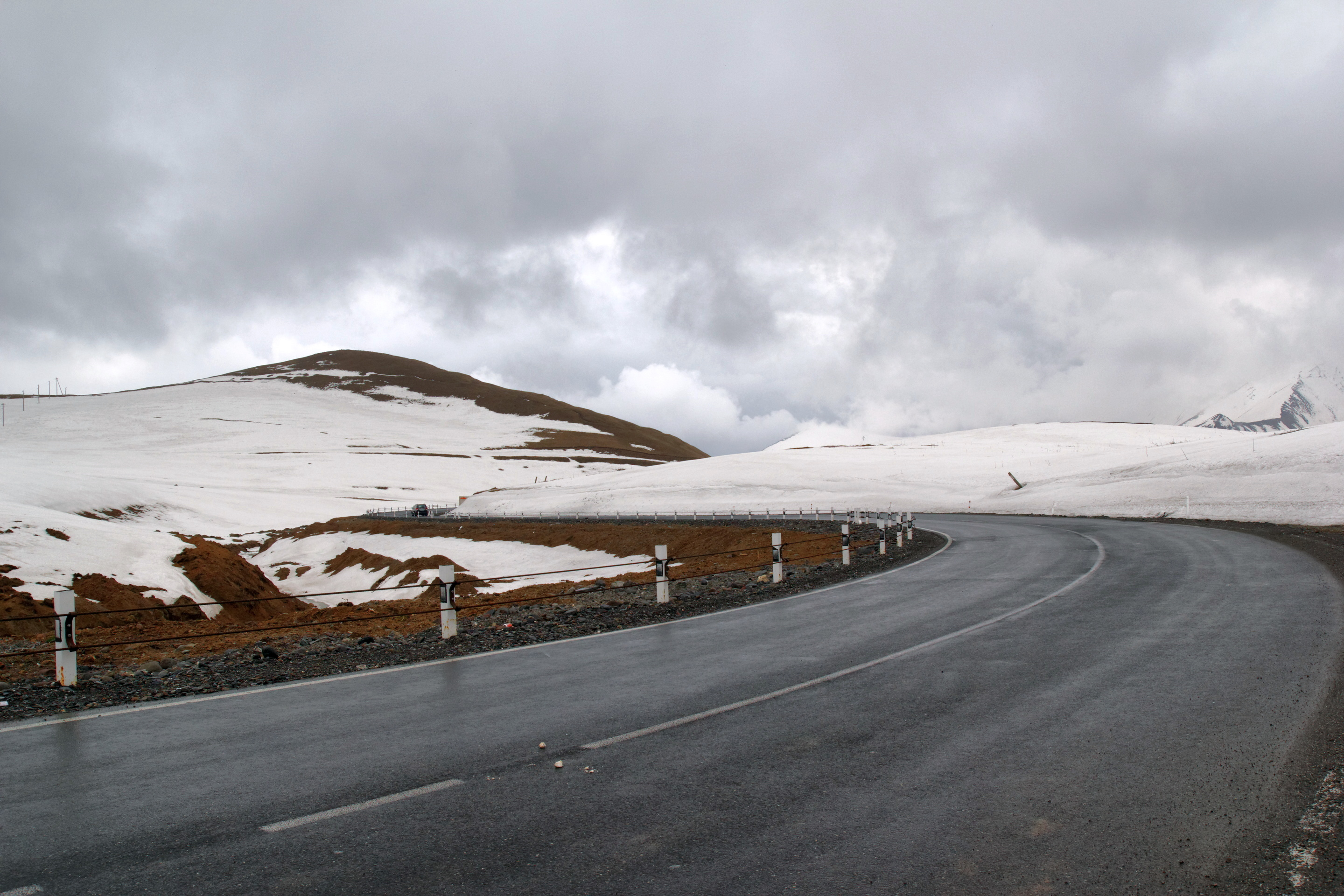
The highest part of Georgian Military Road at the Jvari (Krestovy) Pass. The photo is taken in the month of May

The Georgian Military Road runs for 212 kilometres (132 mi) between Tbilisi (Georgia) and Vladikavkaz (Russia) and follows the traditional route used by invaders and traders throughout the ages. From Vladikavkaz, the road stretches southwards up the valley of the Terek before passing through the Darial Gorge (which marks the border between Russia and Georgia). It then passes Mount Kazbek and Gergeti Trinity Church before heading south-west through the Georgian region of Khevi to the Jvari Pass, where it reaches its maximum altitude of 2,379 metres (7,805 ft) (42.5042°N 44.4538°E). Not long after the pass the road passes the Russia–Georgia Friendship Monument, a large concrete monument built in 1983 to commemorate relations between the two countries and the bicentennial of the Treaty of Georgievsk. The road then turns south-eastwards, following the Tetri Aragvi River through Mtiuleti down to the town of Pasanauri, before heading due south. It then passes below the walls of the medieval fortress of Ananuri before cutting across the wide floodplain of the Tetri Aragvi down to a point just north of Georgia's historic capital, Mtskheta, where it merges into Georgia's main East-West highway (the E60). In this guise, the Georgian Military Road technically continues along the right bank of the Kura (Mtkvari) River before reaching nearby Tbilisi.

The 1914 edition of Baedeker's Russia describes the Georgian Military Road as 'one of the most beautiful mountain roads in the world', and mentions the fact that, as early as its date of publication, 'motor omnibuses of the Société française des transports automobiles du Caucase ply regularly from April 15 to Oct. 15th, [accomplishing] the journey in 10 hrs.'

== History ==
People have used this route since antiquity—both Strabo (Porta Caucasica and Porta Cumana, in his Geographica) and Pliny the Elder mention it. Russian troops first travelled it in 1769. Pavel Potemkin sent 800 troops to improve the road so that by October 1783 he was able to drive to Tiflis in a carriage drawn by eight horses. The Georgian Military Road in its present form was begun by the Russian military in 1799, after the Georgians had abjured centuries of Persian suzerainty and became a Russian protectorate under the 1783 Treaty of Georgievsk. Russian control of the Georgian Military Highway in the center of the Caucasus divided the Caucasian War (1817–1864) into the Russo-Circassian War (1763–1864) in the west and the Murid War in the east.

After the Russian Empire officially annexed the Kingdom of Georgia in 1801, Tsar Alexander I ordered General Aleksey Petrovich Yermolov, the commander-in-chief of Russian forces in the Caucasus, to improve the road surface to facilitate troop movement and communications. When Yermolov announced the completion of work in 1817, the highway was heralded as the "Russian Simplon". However, work continued until 1863. By this stage, it had cost £4 million (equivalent to £483 million in 2023) but according to Lord Bryce in 1876 the work was of a high quality, with two or three lanes and "iron bridges over the torrents", something he considered astonishing given that within Russia proper at this time decent roads were virtually non-existent.

The Georgian Military Road played an important role in the economic development of Transcaucasia and in the Russo-Circassian War.

== The Georgian Military Road today ==
The importance of the Georgian Military Road as a through route has diminished in recent years, primarily due to delays at the border crossing between Russia and Georgia, natural disasters such as landslides, and the outright closure of the border crossing by Russia in 2006.

However, since 2013, when Russia finally agreed to re-open its side of the border as a result of Armenian demands, the road has once again become an important transport artery, mainly for trailer trucks linking Armenia and Russia.

Various restrictions, however, remained (and still remain) in place, particularly for Georgian citizens, but by 2013 a representative of the Russian side of the border could tell the Interfax news agency that around three million people had passed through the Kazbegi-Verkhni Lars customs checkpoint.

The Georgian end of the Road has been subject to truck traffic jams, apparently due to the length of time needed for vehicles transiting Georgia to be admitted into Russia. However, since the opening of a new Georgian customs, administration and parking facility at Kazbegi, the situation has improved.

== See also ==
- List of highest paved roads in Europe
- List of mountain passes
- European route E117
- S3 highway (Georgia)

== Bibliography ==
- Сулейманов, А.С. (1978). Топонимия Чечено-Ингушетии. II часть: Горная Ингушетия (юго-западная часть), Горная Чечня (центральная и юго-восточная части). Грозный: Чечено-Ингушское книжное изд-во. pp. 1–289.
