= Russia–Georgia Friendship Monument =

Monument in Gudauri, Georgia

Panorama Gudauri
- პანორამა გუდაური
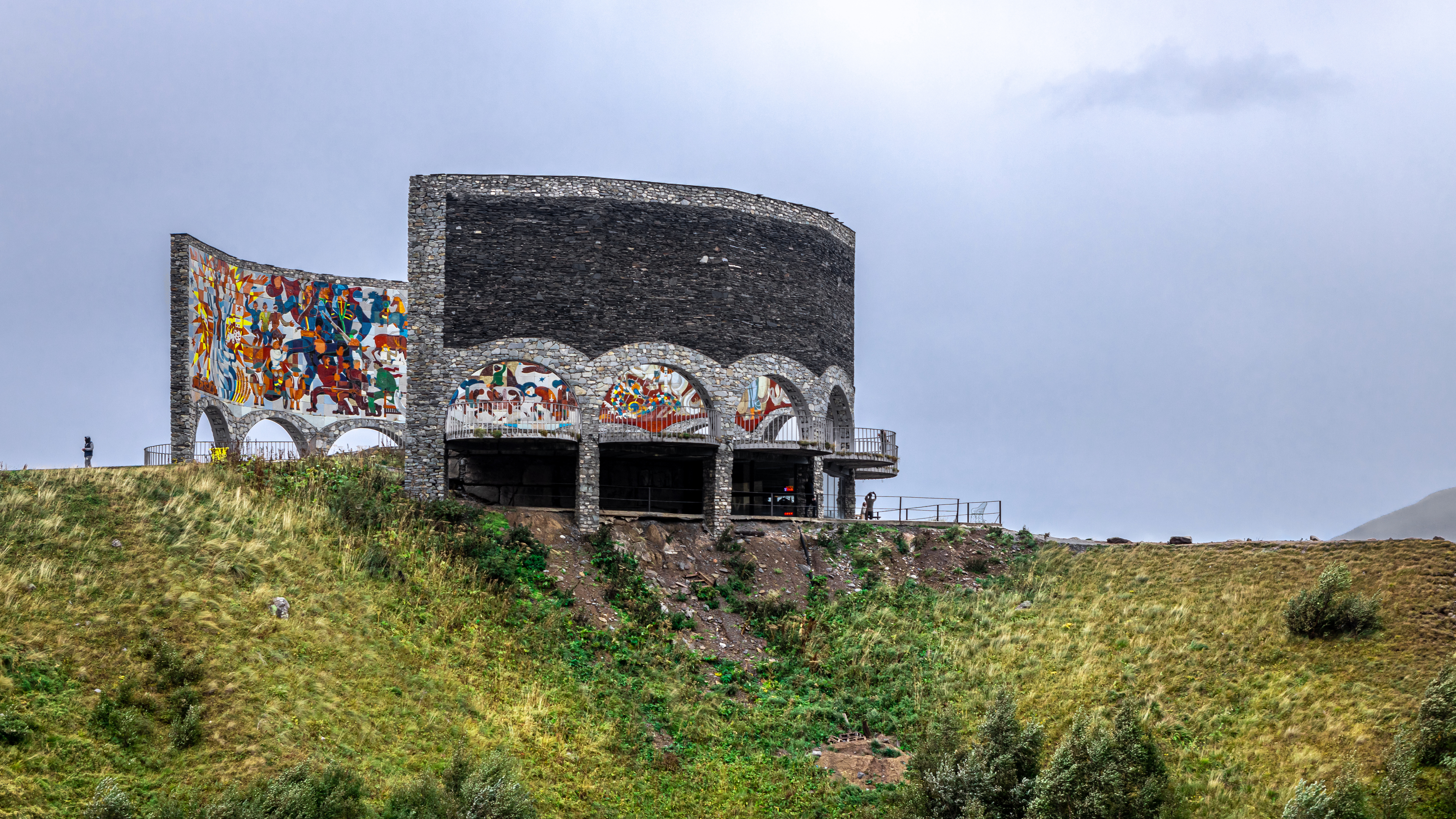
- The monument in september 2023
- Interactive map of Panorama Gudauri
- Location: Gudauri
- Coordinates: 42.4920°N 44.4527°E
- Type: Friendship monument
- Material: stone and concrete
- Completion date: 1983
- Dedicated to: Russo-Georgian relations and the bicentennial of the Treaty of Georgievsk

The Russia–Georgia Friendship Monument or Treaty of Georgievsk Monument is a monument built in 1983 to celebrate the bicentennial of the Treaty of Georgievsk and the ongoing friendship between Soviet Georgia and Soviet Russia. Located on the Georgian Military Highway between the ski resort town of Gudauri and the Jvari pass, the monument is a large round stone and concrete structure overlooking the Devil's Valley in the Caucasus Mountains. Inside the monument is a large tile mural that spans the whole circumference of the structure and depicts scenes of Georgian and Russian history.

== Gallery ==
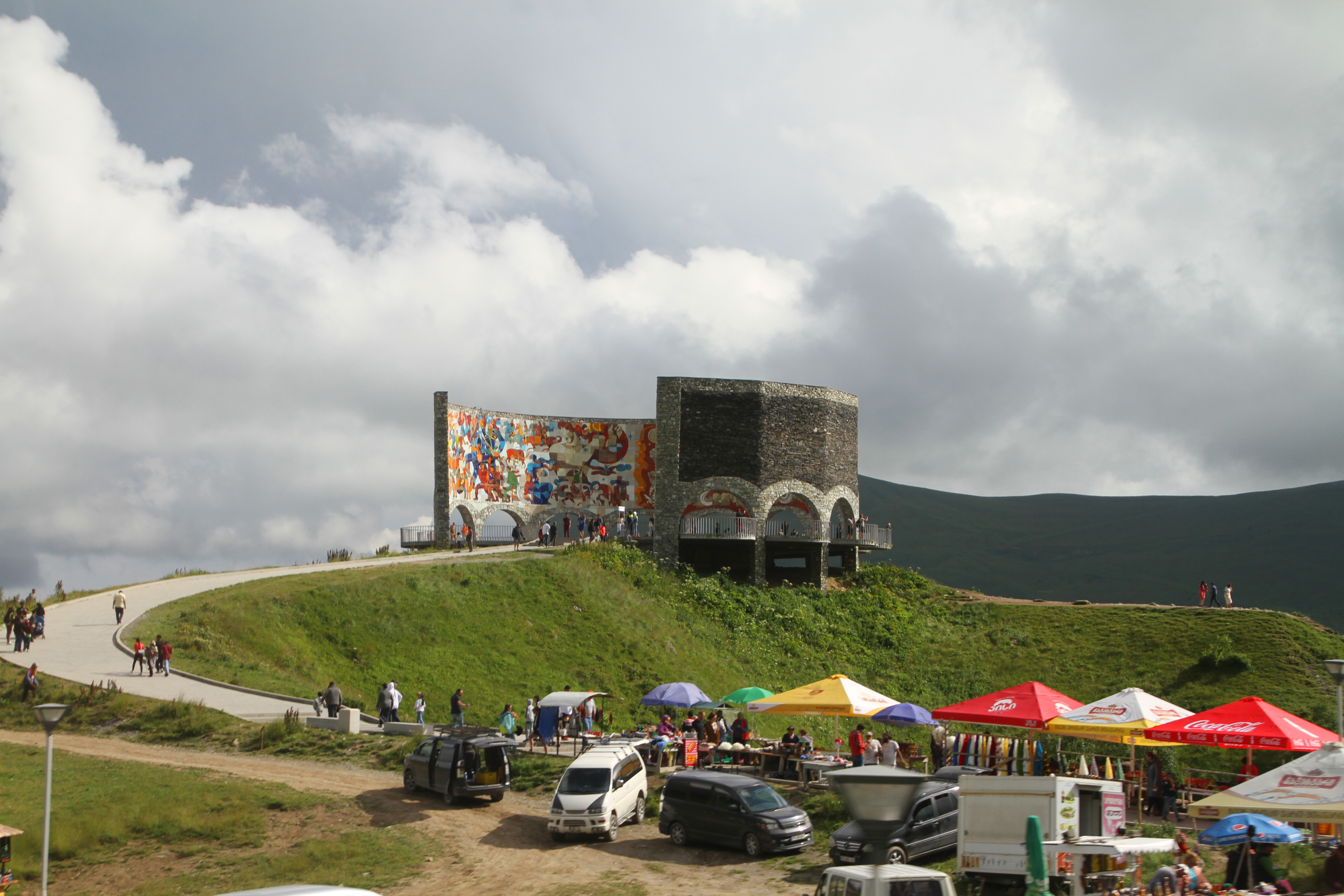
Arrival

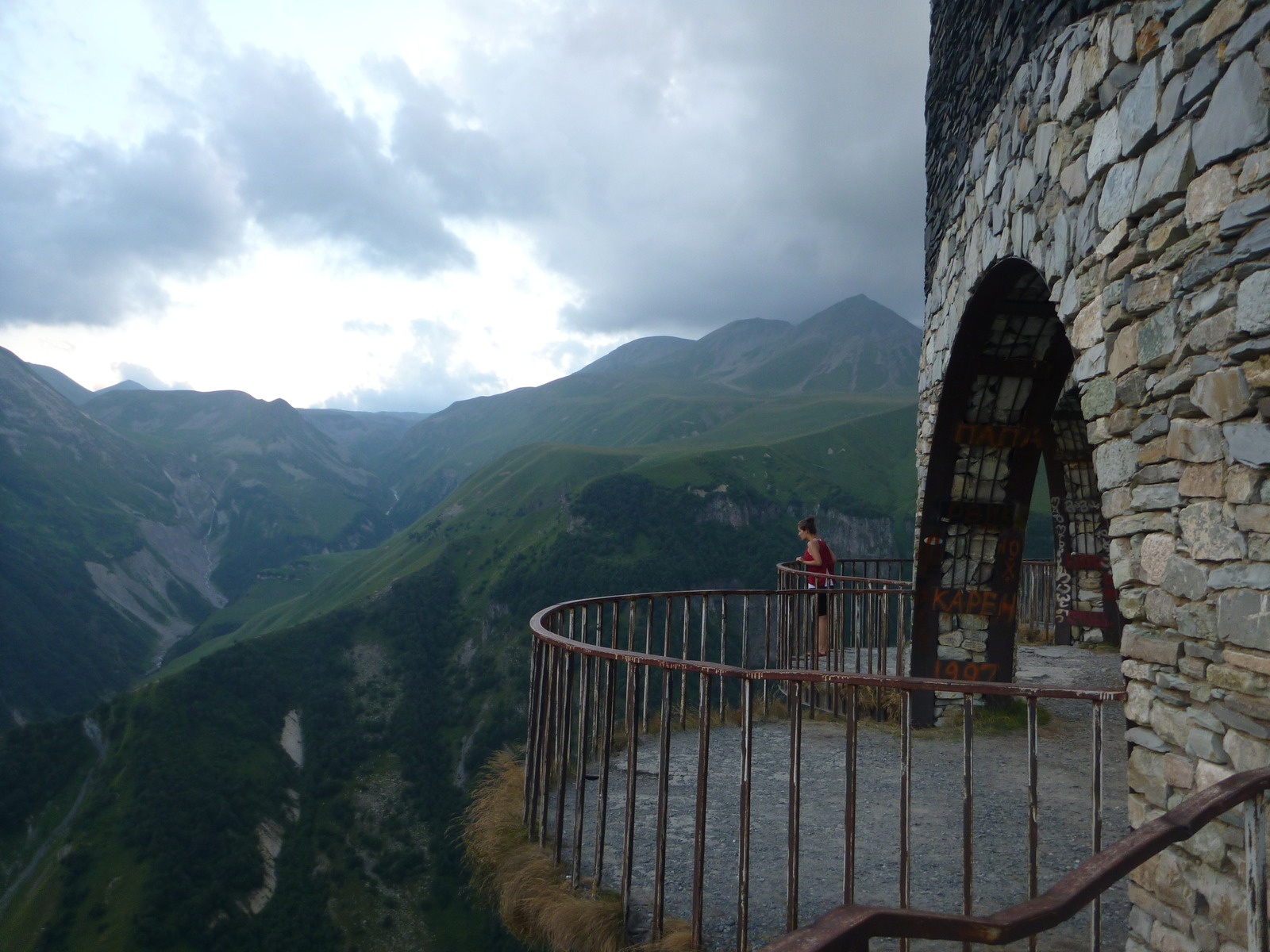
The view from outside

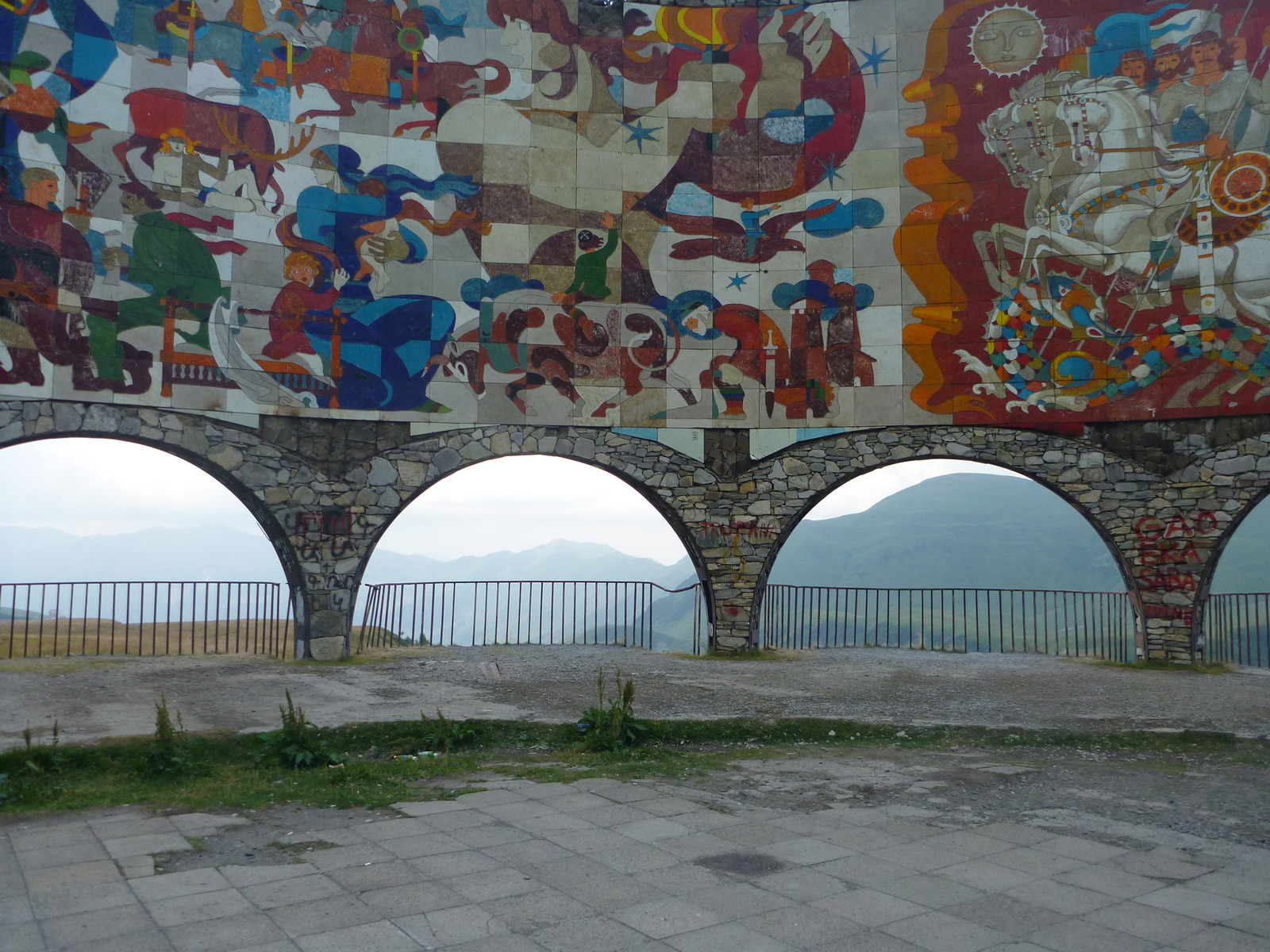
Inside view

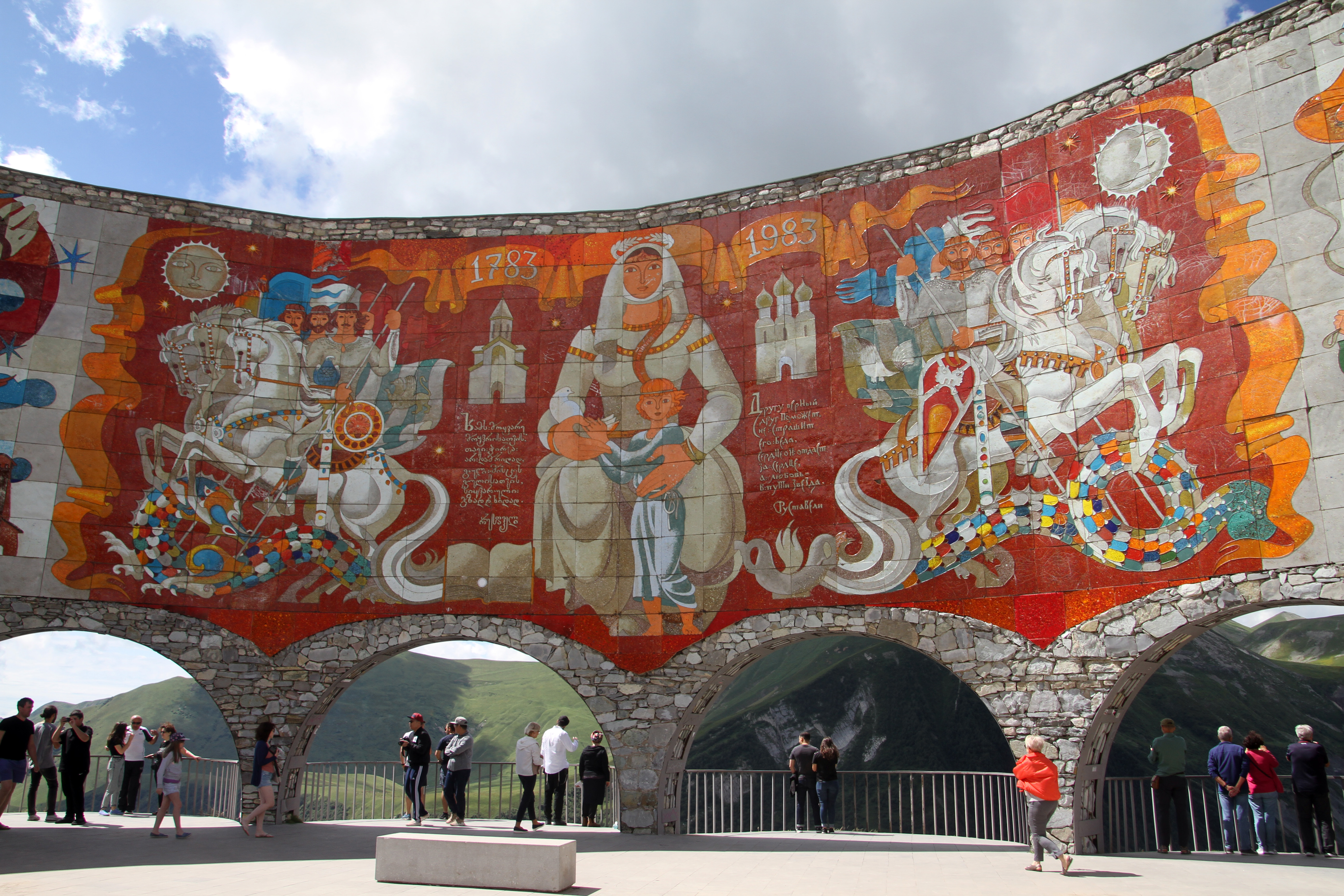
Tile work inside the monument

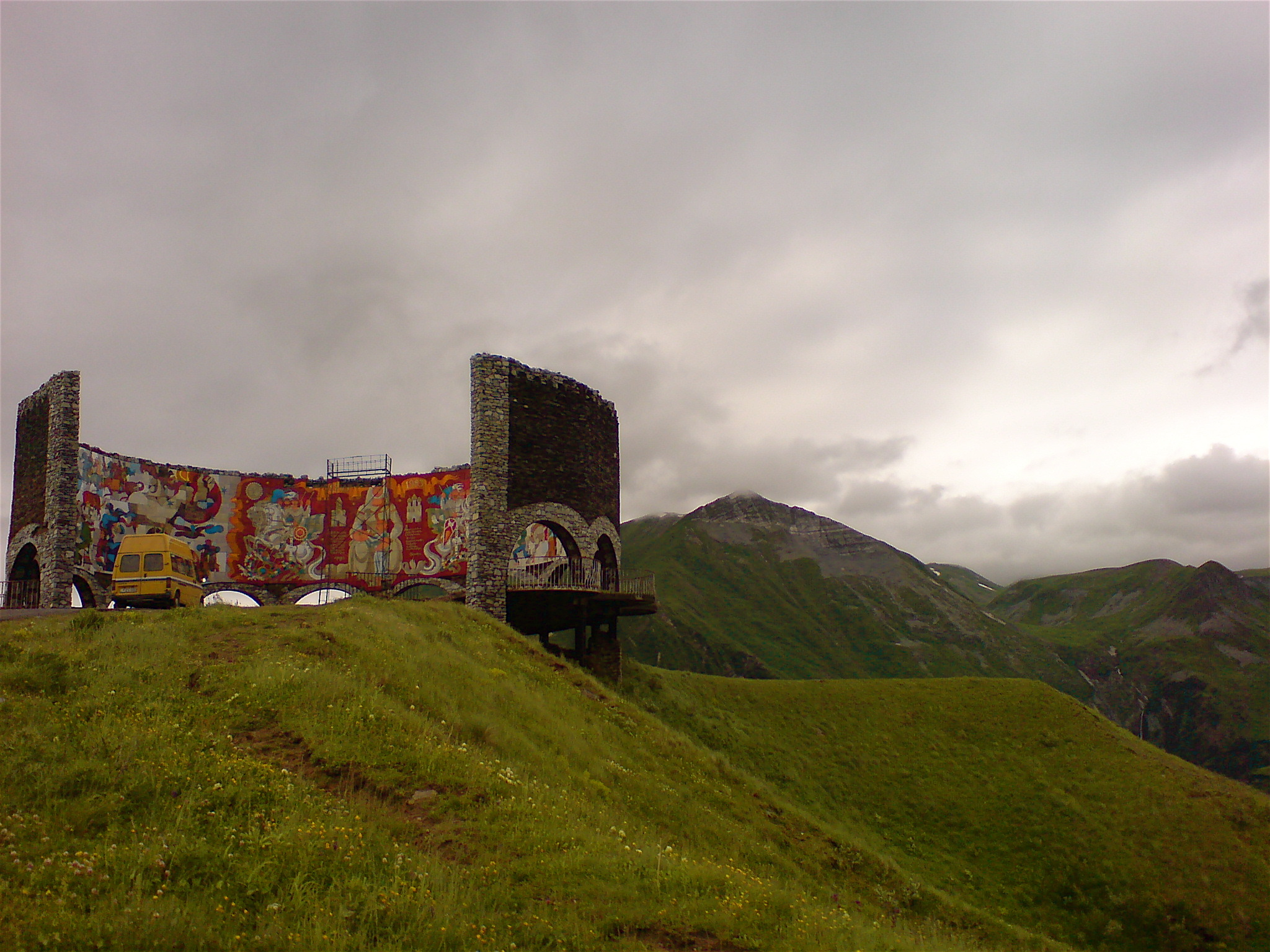
The monument in its surroundings

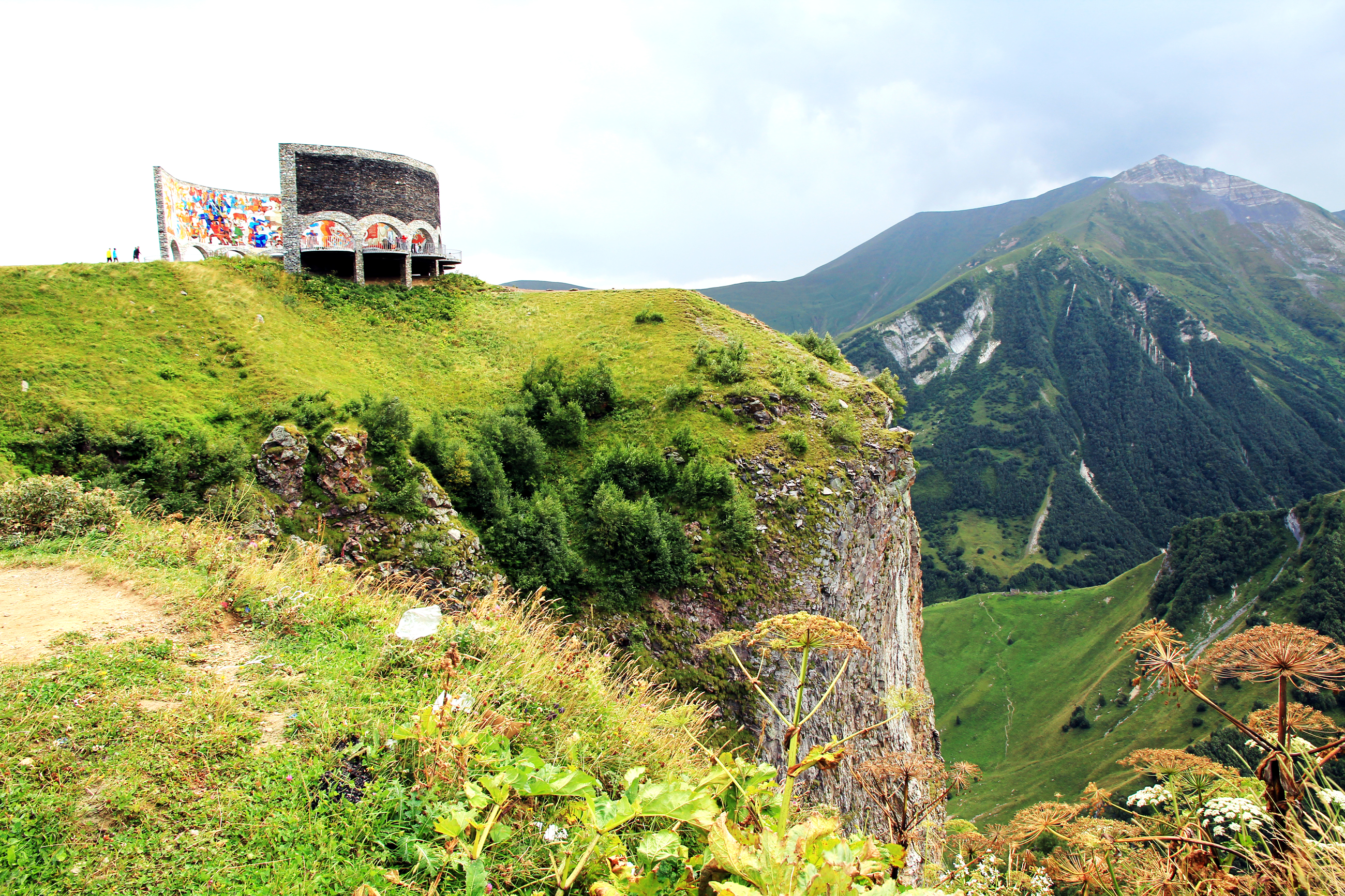
The monument and mountains around
