= Zhinvali =

Zhinvali ჟინვალი
- Townlet
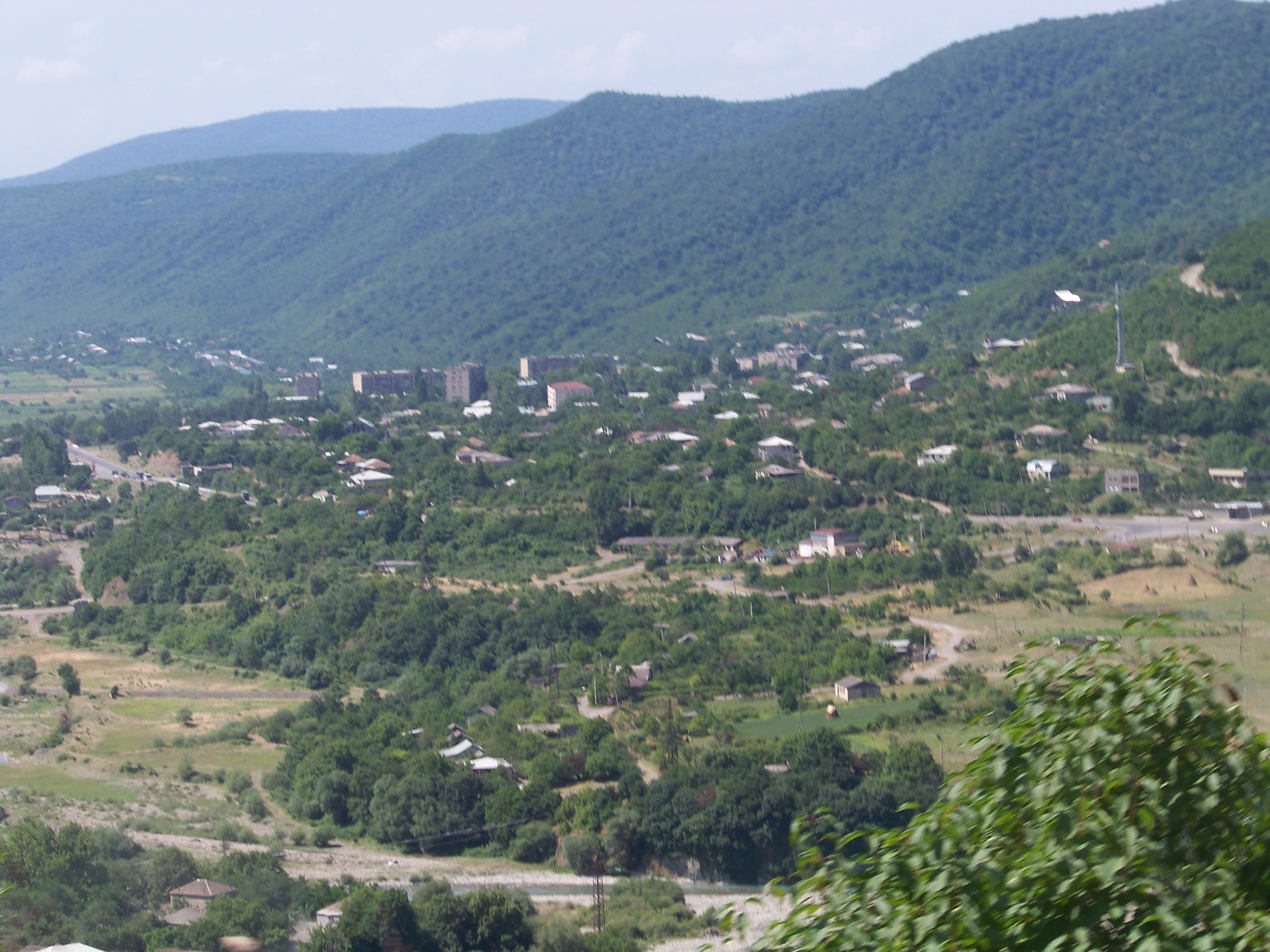
- View on Zhinvali

- Location within Georgia Location within Mtskheta-Mtianeti
- Coordinates: 42°6′27.2″N 44°46′8.7″E
- Country: Georgia
- Mkhare: Mtskheta-Mtianeti
- Municipality: Dusheti
- Elevation: 760 m (2,490 ft)

Population (2014)
  - Total: 1,828
- Time zone: UTC+4 (Georgian Time)

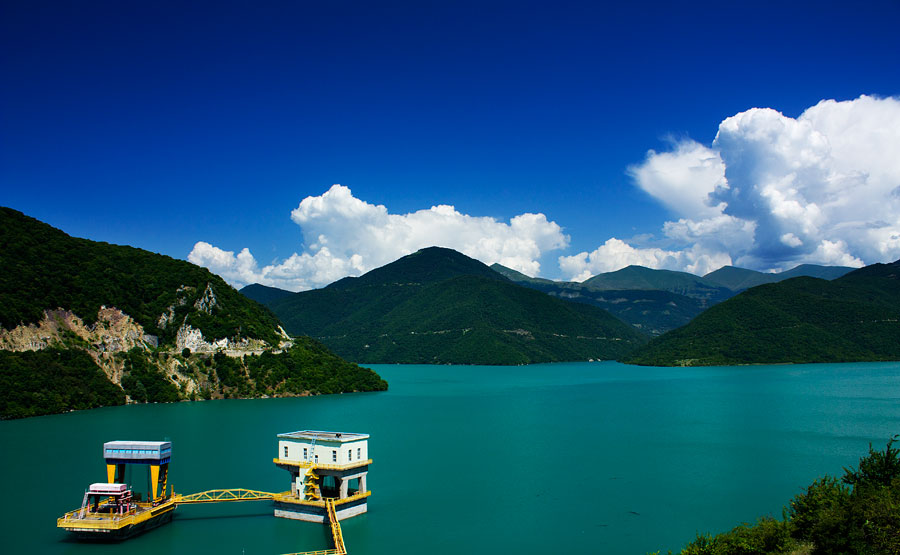
Zhinvali reservoir

Zhinvali (also Jinvali; Georgian: ჟინვალი) is a townlet in Georgia, Dusheti Municipality (Mtskheta-Mtianeti region), on river Aragvi. It has one of the largest hydroelectric power stations in Georgia.

== Climate ==
Climate data for Zhinvali
Month	Jan	Feb	Mar	Apr	May	Jun	Jul	Aug	Sep	Oct	Nov	Dec	Year
Mean daily maximum °C (°F)	3.5 (38.3)	4.7 (40.5)	9.3 (48.7)	16 (61)	21.2 (70.2)	24.8 (76.6)	27.6 (81.7)	27.6 (81.7)	23.3 (73.9)	17.5 (63.5)	10.3 (50.5)	5.2 (41.4)	15.9 (60.7)
Daily mean °C (°F)	−0.9 (30.4)	0.1 (32.2)	4.4 (39.9)	10 (50)	15.1 (59.2)	18.7 (65.7)	21.5 (70.7)	21.5 (70.7)	17.3 (63.1)	11.9 (53.4)	5.8 (42.4)	1 (34)	10.5 (51.0)
Mean daily minimum °C (°F)	−5.2 (22.6)	−4.4 (24.1)	−0.5 (31.1)	4 (39)	9.1 (48.4)	12.6 (54.7)	15.5 (59.9)	15.4 (59.7)	11.3 (52.3)	6.3 (43.3)	1.4 (34.5)	−3.2 (26.2)	5.2 (41.3)
Average precipitation mm (inches)	30 (1.2)	37 (1.5)	49 (1.9)	72 (2.8)	112 (4.4)	103 (4.1)	75 (3.0)	62 (2.4)	58 (2.3)	56 (2.2)	56 (2.2)	39 (1.5)	749 (29.5)
Source: Climate-Data.org

== See also ==
- Aragvi Dam
- Mtskheta-Mtianeti
