= Aragvi =

River in Georgia

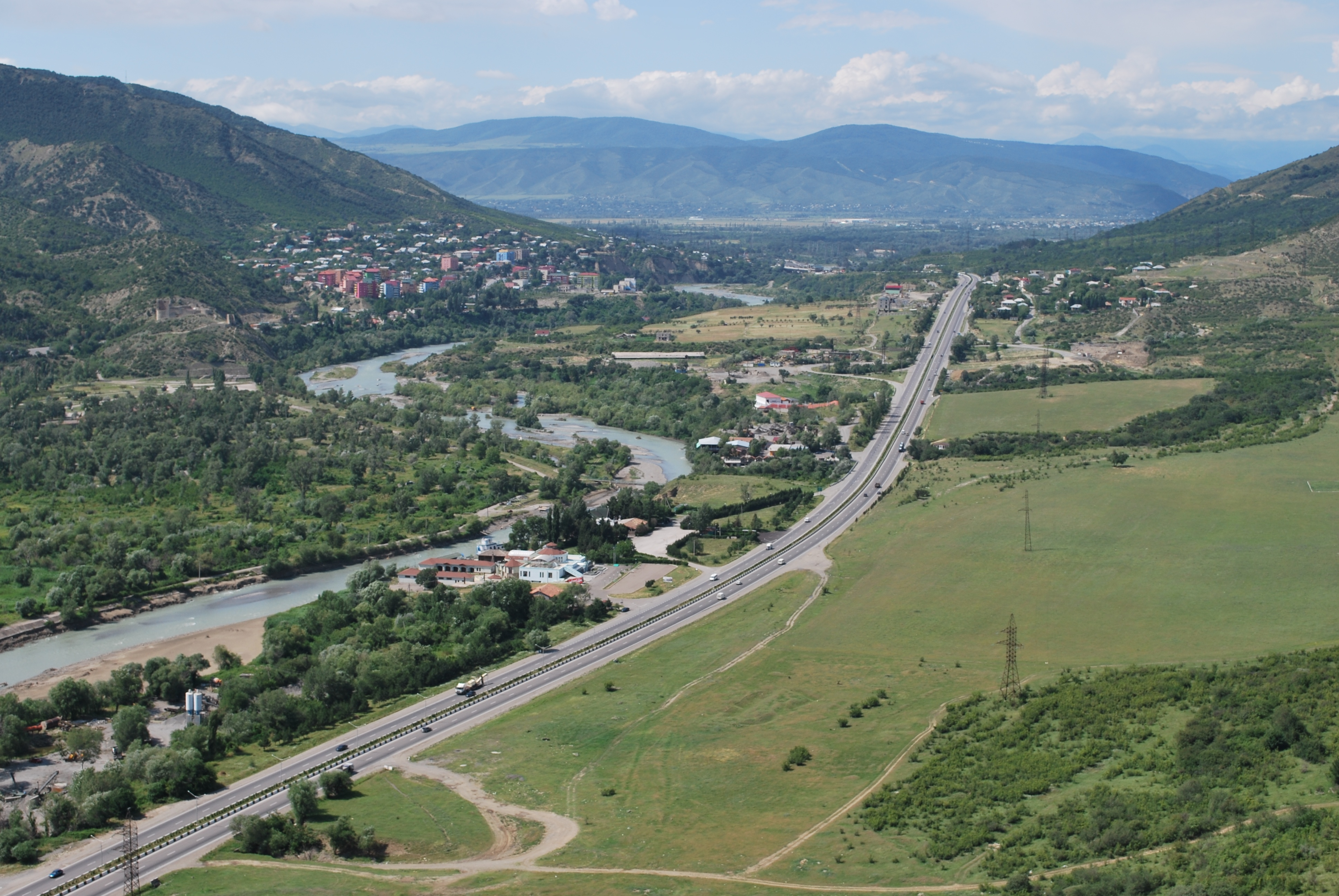
- View upstream Aragvi River and along Tbilisi–Senaki–Leselidze highway (taken from around Jvari Monastery)
- Native name: არაგვი (Georgian)

Location
- Country: Georgia
- Region: Caucasus

Physical characteristics
- Source: Caucasus
  - location: Gudauri, Mtiuleti, Georgia
  - coordinates: 42°20′41″N 44°41′42″E
  - elevation: 1,045 m (3,428 ft)
- Mouth: flows into the Mtkvari (Kura)
  - location: Mtskheta, Georgia
  - coordinates: 41°50′24″N 44°43′34″E
  - elevation: 445 m (1,460 ft)
- Length: 112 km (70 mi)
- Basin size: 2,740 km^{2} (1,060 sq mi)

Basin features
- Progression: Kura→ Caspian Sea

The Aragvi (Georgian: არაგვი, romanized: aragvi [ˈäɾägvi]) and its basin are in Georgia on the southern slopes of the Caucasus Mountains. The river is 112 km (70 mi) long, and its basin covers an area of 2,740 km^{2} (1,060 mi^{2}). The ground strata are mostly sandstone, slate, and limestone. The Zhinvali Dam and its 130 MW hydro-electric power station generate much of Georgia's power, and its construction in 1986 formed the Zhinvali Reservoir, upon whose north-western shores rises Ananuri castle with its 17th-century Church of the Assumption.

== Confusion over name and course ==
Given its etymology (see below; the word simply means "river"), the exact course of the Aragvi River is the source of some confusion. The river has several important tributaries, all called "Aragvi":

The Tetri Aragvi ("White Aragvi") flows from Gudauri down to the town of Pasanauri, where it is joined by the Shavi Aragvi ("Black Aragvi"), the main river of Gudamakari to the north-east. Together, these two rivers continue as, simply, "the Aragvi"; from Pasanauri, the Aragvi flows south-east to the Zhinvali Reservoir, where it is joined by the Pshav Aragvi (itself fed by the Khevsur Aragvi) before flowing south to merge with the Mtkvari by Mtskheta, Eastern Georgia's ancient capital just north of Tbilisi.

== Etymology ==
According to Iranologist Anahit Perikhanian, the name of the river derives from Old Iranian *Aragv(ī), from Proto-Iranian *Ragvī-, the feminine form of *ragu- 'swift' (compare Sanskrit raghvī́, feminine of raghú 'rapid', and Armenian arag/erag 'rapid', an Iranian borrowing).

Nakh etymology must also be considered - some dialects such as Terloi Chechen use erk for 'deep narrow valley', while -vi is a common Georgian toponymic suffix.

A Kartvelian etymology, albeit more tentative than the proposals above, is also possible: ragvi means “a trap for birds and mice,” and there is a documented toponymic derivation from this word in the names of the village of Oragve and the river Oragvisghele. O- is a Zan prefix corresponding to Georgian Sa-, thus yielding the Georgian form Saragve.

== Use and infrastructure ==
The 102 m (335 ft) high dam by Zhinvali is one of the largest in Georgia. Besides generating up to 130 MW of electricity, the waters of the Aragvi travel down a 36.7 km (22.8 mi) pipe to provide drinking water in Tbilisi and to irrigate fields.

== Gallery ==
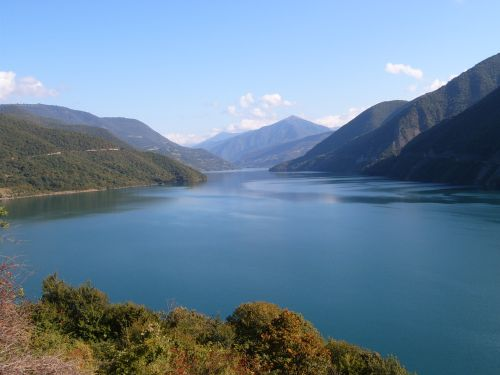
Zhinvali reservoir

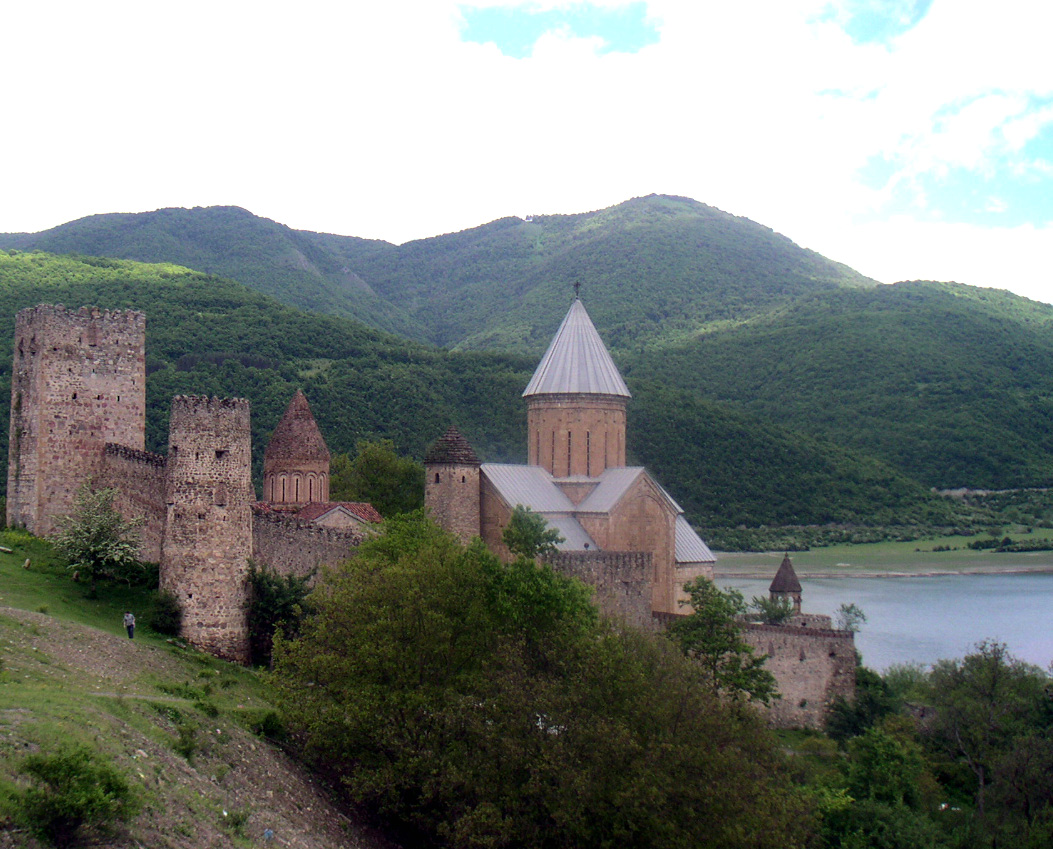
Ananuri castle

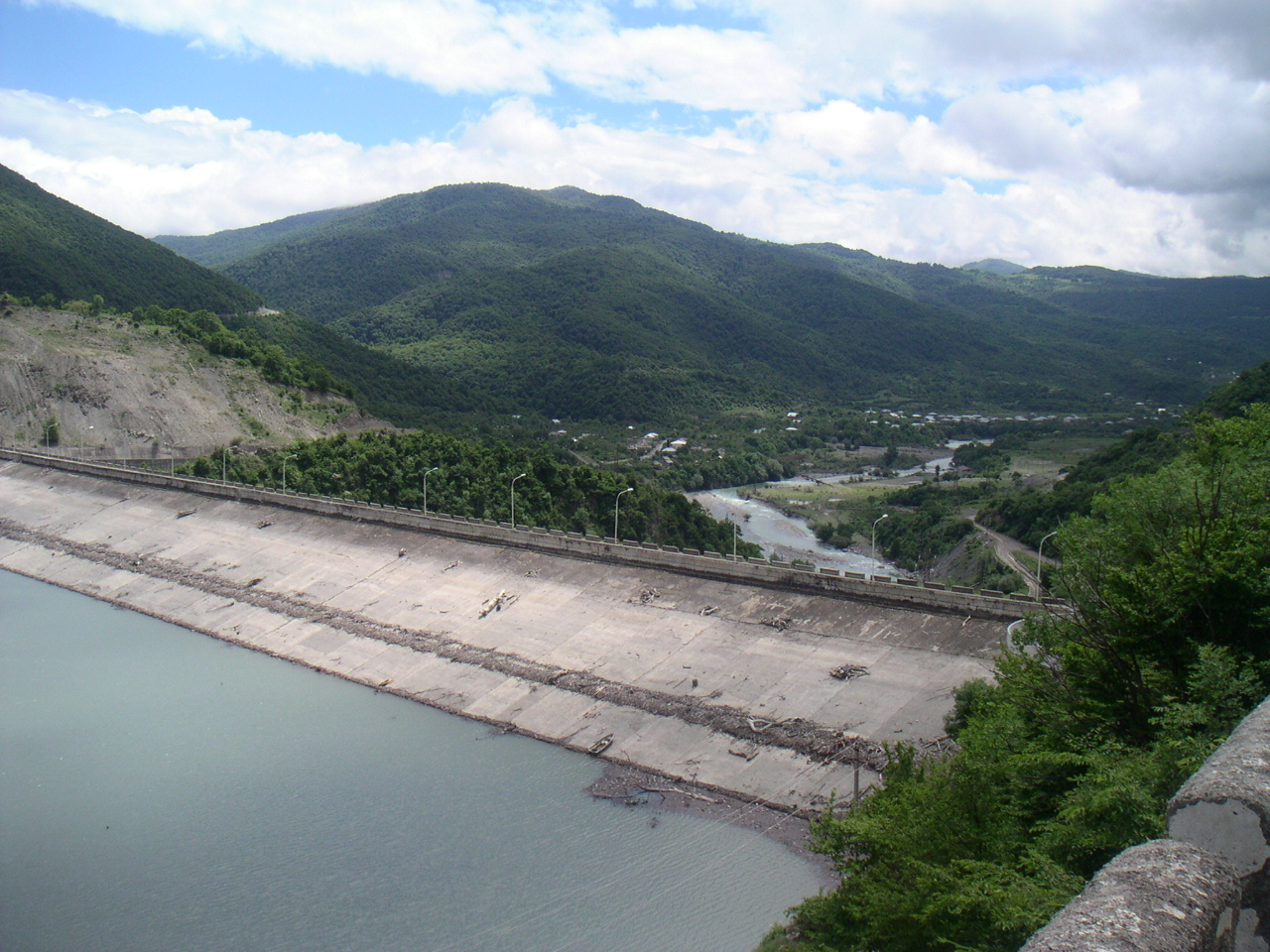
Hydroelectric dam on the Aragvi

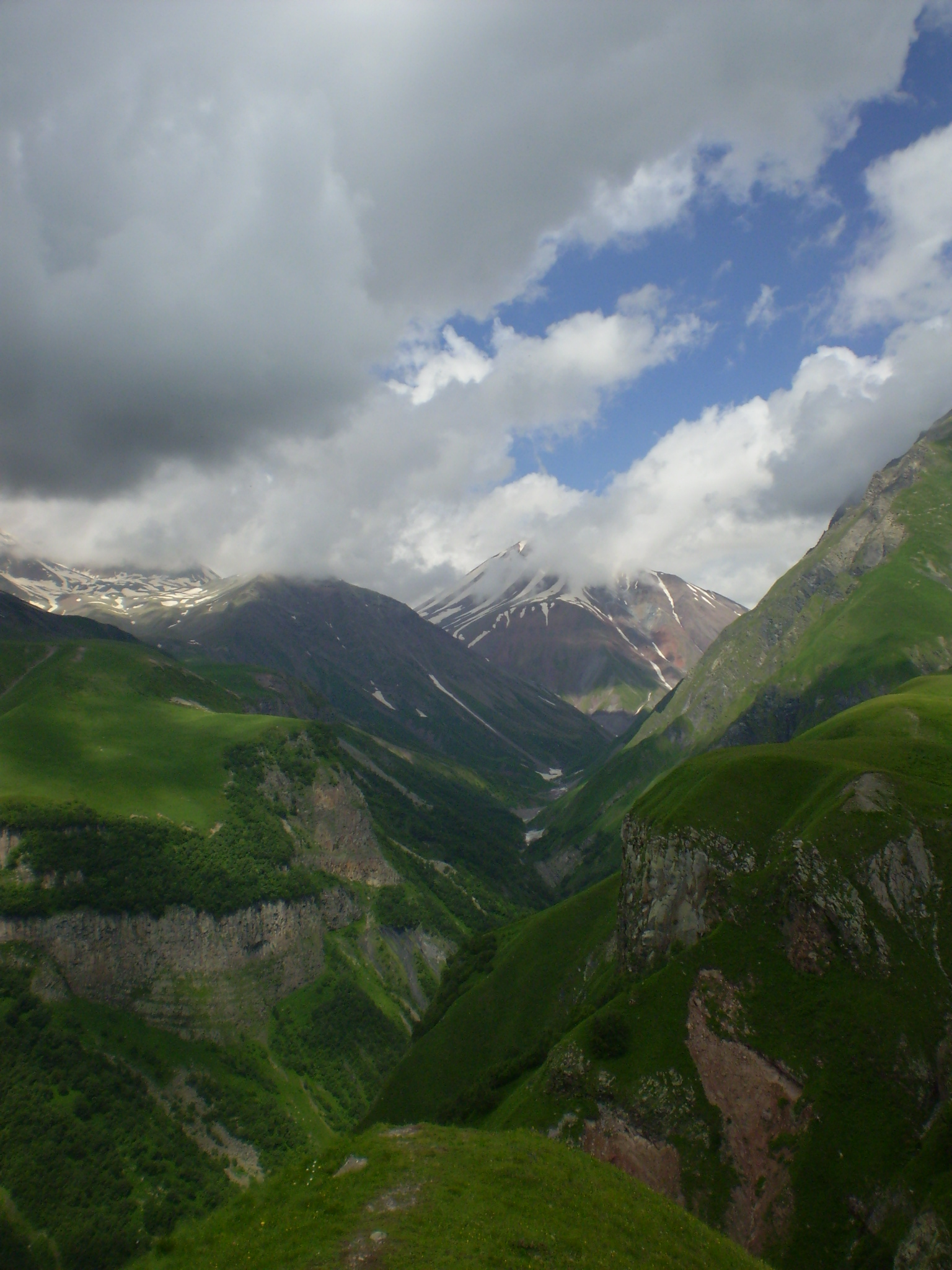
The source of the Aragvi to the north of Gudauri
