= Zhinvali Dam =

Zhinvali HPP
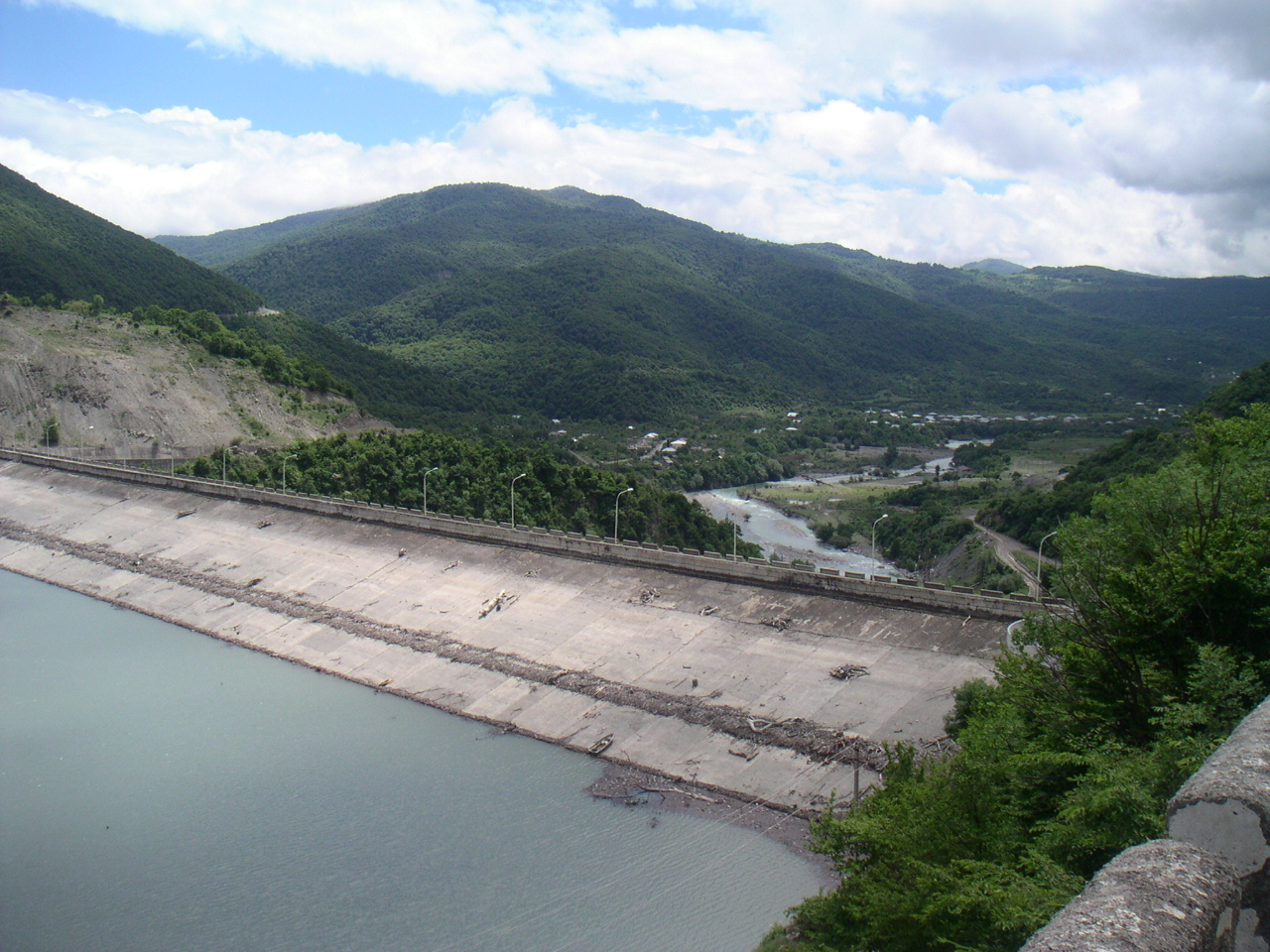

- Location within Georgia
- Country: Georgia
- Location: Zhinvali
- Coordinates: 42°08′06″N 44°46′20″E
- Status: Operational
- Construction began: 1974
- Opening date: 1985

Dam and spillways
- Type of dam: Pebble-fill dam
- Impounds: Aragvi River
- Height: 102 m (335 ft)
- Length: 415 m (1,362 ft)
- Width (crest): 9 m (30 ft)
- Width (base): 484.75 m (1,590.4 ft)

Reservoir
- Creates: Zhinvali Reservoir
- Total capacity: 0.52 km^{3} (420,000 acre⋅ft)

Power Station
- Turbines: 4 X 32.5 MW
- Installed capacity: 130 MW

The Zhinvali Dam is a hydroelectric dam on the Aragvi River in the Caucasus Mountains in Zhinvali, Georgia. The Zhinvali Hydroelectric Power Plant has four turbines, each with a nominal capacity of 32.5 MW, for a combined capacity of 130 MW. In addition to generating electricity, it performs the important function of supplying drinking water for the Georgian capital Tbilisi.

The building of the dam in 1986 formed the Zhinvali Reservoir.

== Panoramic views ==
Panoramic view of Zhinvali reservoir in september 2023

== See also ==
- List of power stations in Georgia (country)
- Energy in Georgia (country)
