= Pasanauri =

Pasanauri Georgian: ფასანაური
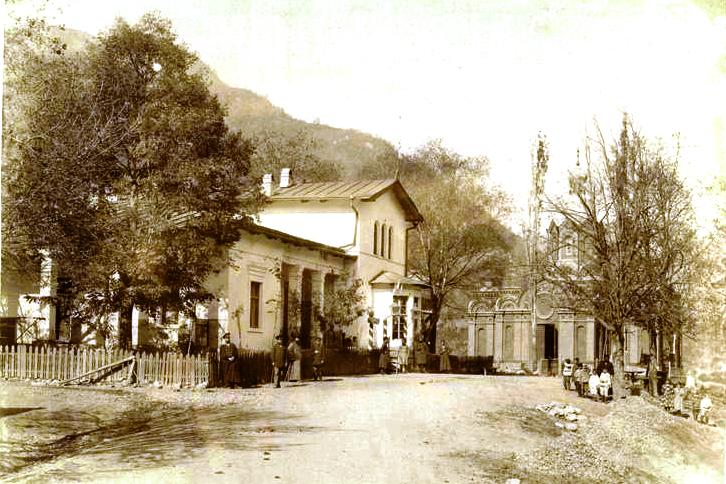
- Pasanauri in the 1870s

- Location within Mtskheta-Mtianeti Location within Georgia
- Coordinates: 42°20′47″N 44°41′34″E
- Country: Georgia
- Mkhare: Mtskheta-Mtianeti
- Municipality: Dusheti
- Elevation: 1,050 m (3,440 ft)

Population (2014)
  - Total: 1,148
- Time zone: UTC+4 (Georgian Time)

Pasanauri (Georgian: ფასანაური, also spelled Passanauri) is a small town (daba) in Georgia, situated in the Dusheti district, Mtskheta-Mtianeti region.

Pasanauri lies about 90 kilometres (56 mi) north of the nation's capital of Tbilisi, at elevation of 1,050 m. above sea level. Located on the Georgian Military Road, Pasanauri is flanked by the Aragvi River, and surrounded by the Caucasus Mountains. Average winter temperature is 0 degrees Celsius, and often falls below 10 degrees Celsius. As of the 2014 census, the townlet had a population of 1,148.

Due to its picturesque location and the proximity to nearby historical sites as well as for its mineral water, hiking routes, handcrafted items and food, Pasanauri became a popular tourist destination in the Soviet period, but suffered decay during the years of post-Soviet crisis.

== Climate ==
Pasanauri's climate is humid continental (Köppen climate classification: Dfb, Trewartha climate classification: Dcbo) with warm summers and cold winters. 14.4 days per year have a maximum temperature above 30 °C (86 °F), while 115.3 days have minimum temperature below freezing.

From November to April, there are 73.1 days on average with snow cover, of which 45.9 days have at least 10 cm (3.9 in) of snow depth.

Climate data for Pasanauri (1991–2020, extremes 1981-2020)
Month	Jan	Feb	Mar	Apr	May	Jun	Jul	Aug	Sep	Oct	Nov	Dec	Year
Record high °C (°F)	11.9 (53.4)	15.5 (59.9)	22.9 (73.2)	28.5 (83.3)	33.0 (91.4)	32.5 (90.5)	36.0 (96.8)	37.0 (98.6)	36.0 (96.8)	28.0 (82.4)	24.0 (75.2)	17.7 (63.9)	37.0 (98.6)
Mean daily maximum °C (°F)	2.5 (36.5)	4.8 (40.6)	9.4 (48.9)	15.0 (59.0)	19.6 (67.3)	23.8 (74.8)	26.5 (79.7)	26.7 (80.1)	22.2 (72.0)	16.8 (62.2)	9.6 (49.3)	4.0 (39.2)	15.1 (59.2)
Mean daily minimum °C (°F)	−6.4 (20.5)	−5.5 (22.1)	−1.2 (29.8)	3.6 (38.5)	7.7 (45.9)	11.2 (52.2)	14.0 (57.2)	13.8 (56.8)	9.9 (49.8)	5.4 (41.7)	−0.4 (31.3)	−4.5 (23.9)	4.0 (39.2)
Record low °C (°F)	−21.0 (−5.8)	−20.0 (−4.0)	−17.3 (0.9)	−10.4 (13.3)	−2.0 (28.4)	3.0 (37.4)	6.0 (42.8)	6.0 (42.8)	−0.7 (30.7)	−5.8 (21.6)	−13.0 (8.6)	−20.5 (−4.9)	−21.0 (−5.8)
Average precipitation mm (inches)	45.9 (1.81)	42.8 (1.69)	68.7 (2.70)	97.0 (3.82)	139.5 (5.49)	120.6 (4.75)	93.8 (3.69)	85.7 (3.37)	71.4 (2.81)	80.1 (3.15)	52.7 (2.07)	42.0 (1.65)	940.2 (37)
Average precipitation days (≥ 1.0 mm)	5.6	6.1	7.8	11	13.7	11.8	8.6	8.2	7.3	7.8	5.7	5.3	98.9
Source: NCEI

== See also ==
- Mtskheta-Mtianeti
