= Gergeti Trinity Church =

Church near Stepantsminda, Georgia

Coordinates: 42°39′45″N 44°37′13″E

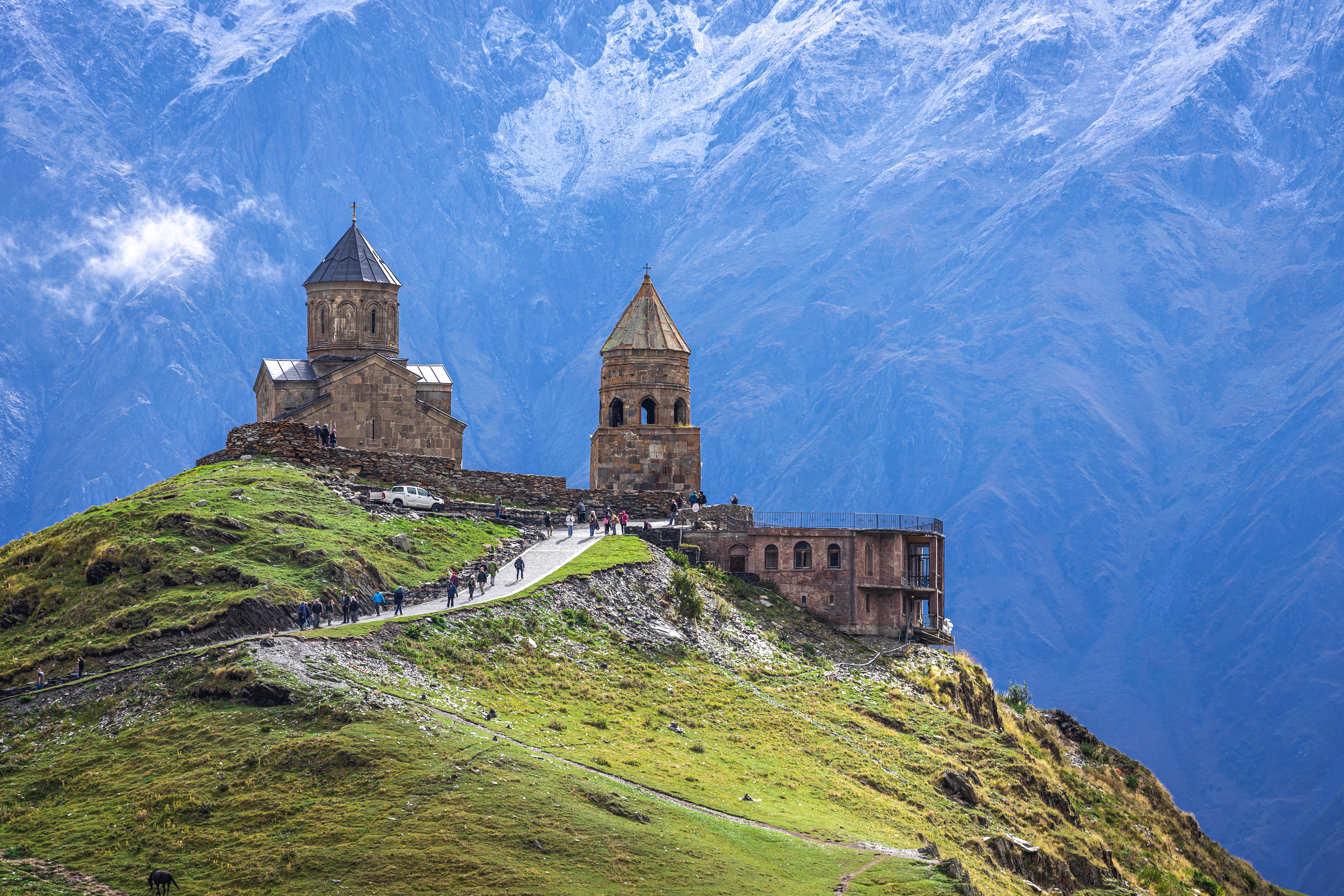
Gergeti Trinity Church in 2023, looking southeast

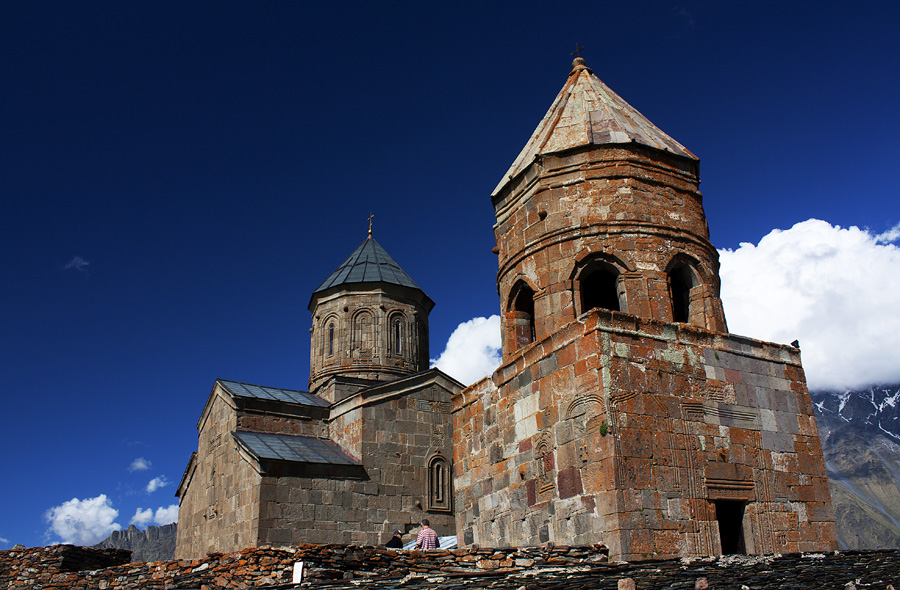
Gergeti Trinity Church

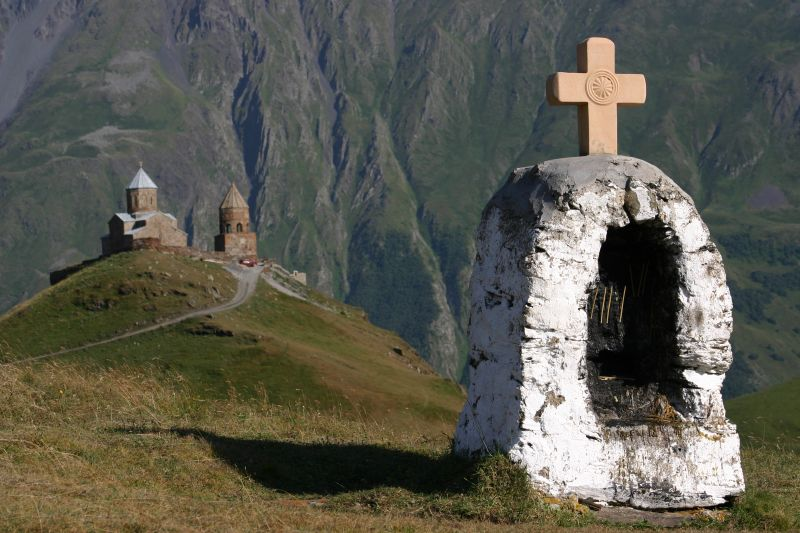
Gergeti Trinity Church

Gergeti Trinity Church (Georgian: გერგეტის სამების ეკლესია - Gergetis Samebis Eklesia) is a popular name for the Holy Trinity Church near the village of Stepantsminda in Georgia. The church is situated on the right bank of the river Chkheri (the left tributary of the river Terek), at an elevation of 2,170 metres (7,120 ft), under Mount Kazbek.

== Architecture ==
The church ensemble includes the church itself, the belltower and the surrounding wall. The church is a cross-in-square temple with three rectangular and one rounded (containing the apse) arms, and two entrances, from the south and from the west. Each arm has a window. Additional five windows of the tholobate provide sufficient illumination. The tholobate is rather stumpy, slightly narrowing in the upper part. The facade is clad in dark-grey stone. Only traces of the original murals remain.

The outside decorations can essentially be found only around the doors and windows. The northern wall is the most simply decorated one: short-armed cross above and rounded ornamented stones below the narrow window. The southern wall, in addition to the cross, has ornamented quadrangles and an arch above the window. The western wall is rather similar, but with simple ornamentation of the window. Rather complex composition is found on the eastern wall. Its window has a quadrangular frame and a large cross above it. The cross itself has quadrangles at the base of each arm. In addition to the central window, there is a rounded window to left and a square window to the right. Both southern and western portals have rich decorations around the doors: the astragal, ornamented stripe, rosettes and quadrangles. Each of the ten windows of the dome also has an arch frame, made of astragal.

The belltower, standing to the south of the church, consists of a belfry on a cubic base, which also contains the entrance to the church ensemble. The walls have various small ornaments, as well as a figure of an unknown person on the western side.

View of Gergeti Church over Kazbegi/Stepantsminda.
