= Ananuri =

Castle complex in Dusheti, Georgia

- ანანური
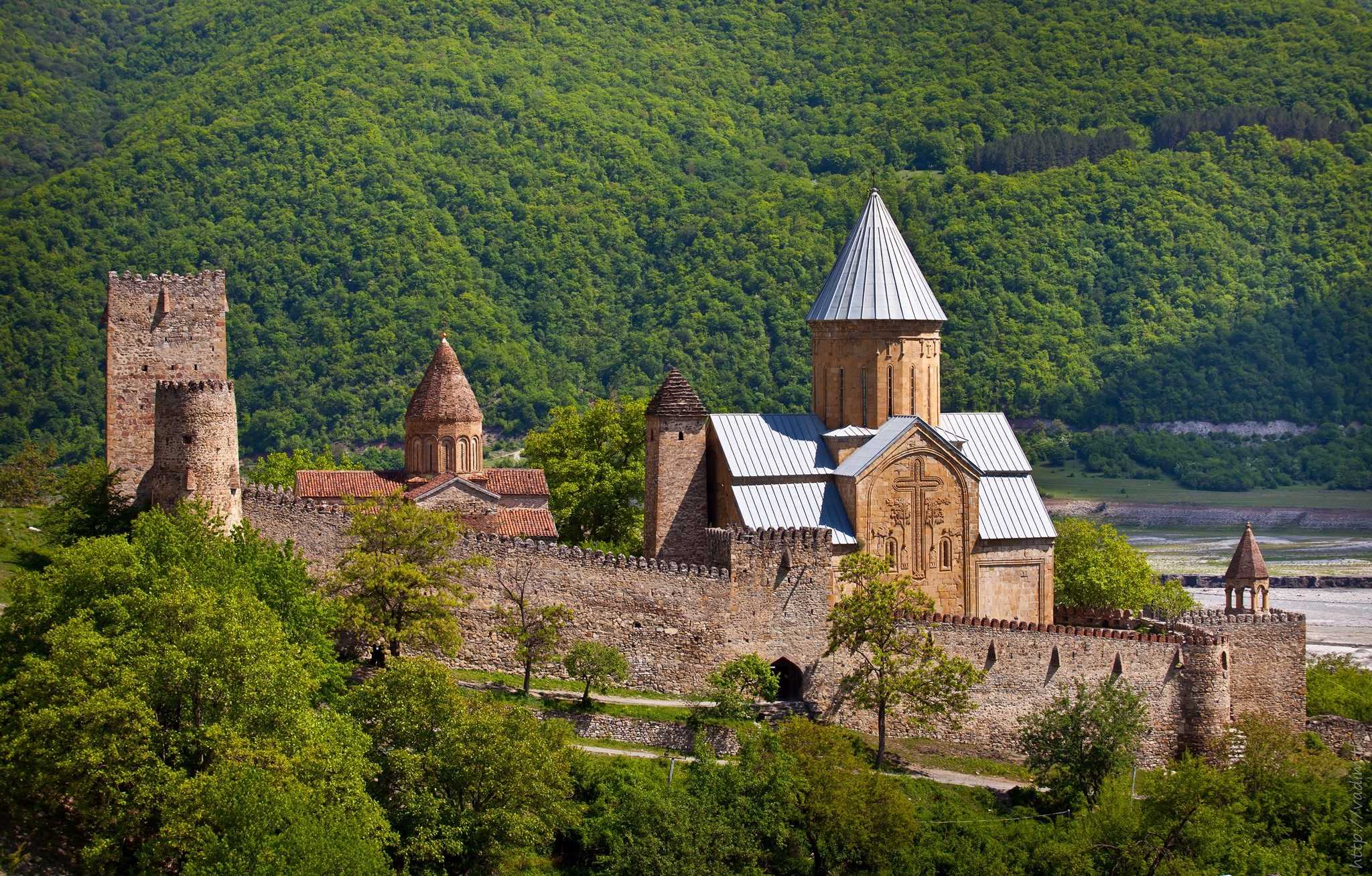
- View from the tower
- Interactive map of Ananuri
- Location: Dusheti, Mtskheta-Mtianeti, Georgia
- Coordinates: 42°09′49″N 44°42′14″E
- Type: Fortress, church

Ananuri (Georgian: ანანური) is a castle complex on the Aragvi River in Dusheti Municipality Georgia, about 45 mi (72 km) from Tbilisi.

== History ==
Ananuri was a castle and seat of the eristavis (Dukes) of Aragvi, a feudal dynasty which ruled the area from the 13th century. The castle was the scene of numerous battles.

In 1739, Ananuri was attacked by forces from a rival duchy, commanded by Shanshe of Ksani and was set on fire. The Aragvi clan was massacred. However, four years later, the local peasants revolted against rule by the Shanshe, killing the usurpers and inviting King Teimuraz II to rule directly over them. However, in 1746, King Teimuraz was forced to suppress another peasant uprising, with the help of King Erekle II of Kakheti. The fortress remained in use until the beginning of the 19th century. In 2007, the complex has been on the tentative list for inclusion into the UNESCO World Heritage Site program.

When the castle was under siege, it was not defeated because a secret tunnel led to the water and thus provided a way to get food and water to the people who had taken refuge in the castle. The enemy finally captured a woman named Ana, who was from Nuri, and tortured her to reveal the location of the tunnel. But she chose to die rather than giving the secret away. Hence the castle was called Ananuri, and she became a legend.

== Architecture ==
The fortifications consist of two castles joined by a crenellated curtain wall. The upper fortification with a large square tower, known as Sheupovari, is well preserved and is the location of the last defense of the Aragvi against the Shanshe. The lower fortification, with a round tower, is mostly in ruins.

Within the complex are two churches among other buildings. The older Church of the Virgin, which abuts a tall square tower, has the graves of some of the Dukes of Aragvi. It dates from the first half of the 17th century, and was built of brick. The interior is no longer decorated, but of interest is a stone baldaquin erected by the widow of the Duke Edishera, who died in 1674.

The larger Church of the Mother of God (Ghvtismshobeli) was built in 1689 for the son of Duke Bardzim. It is a central dome style structure with richly decorated façades, including a carved north entrance and a carved grapevine cross on the south façade. It also contains the remains of a number of frescoes, most of which were destroyed by the fire in the 18th century.

== Gallery ==
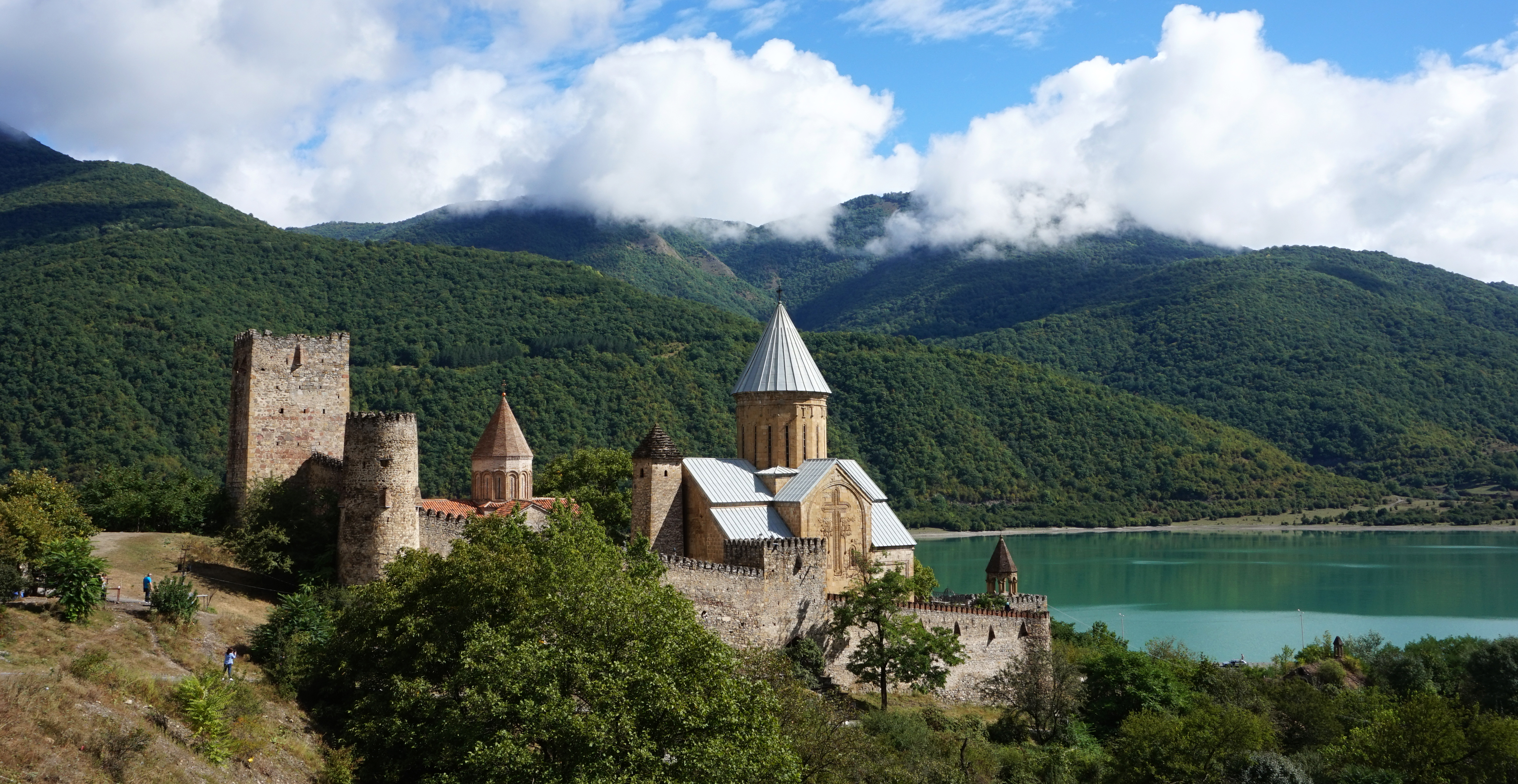
Ananuri

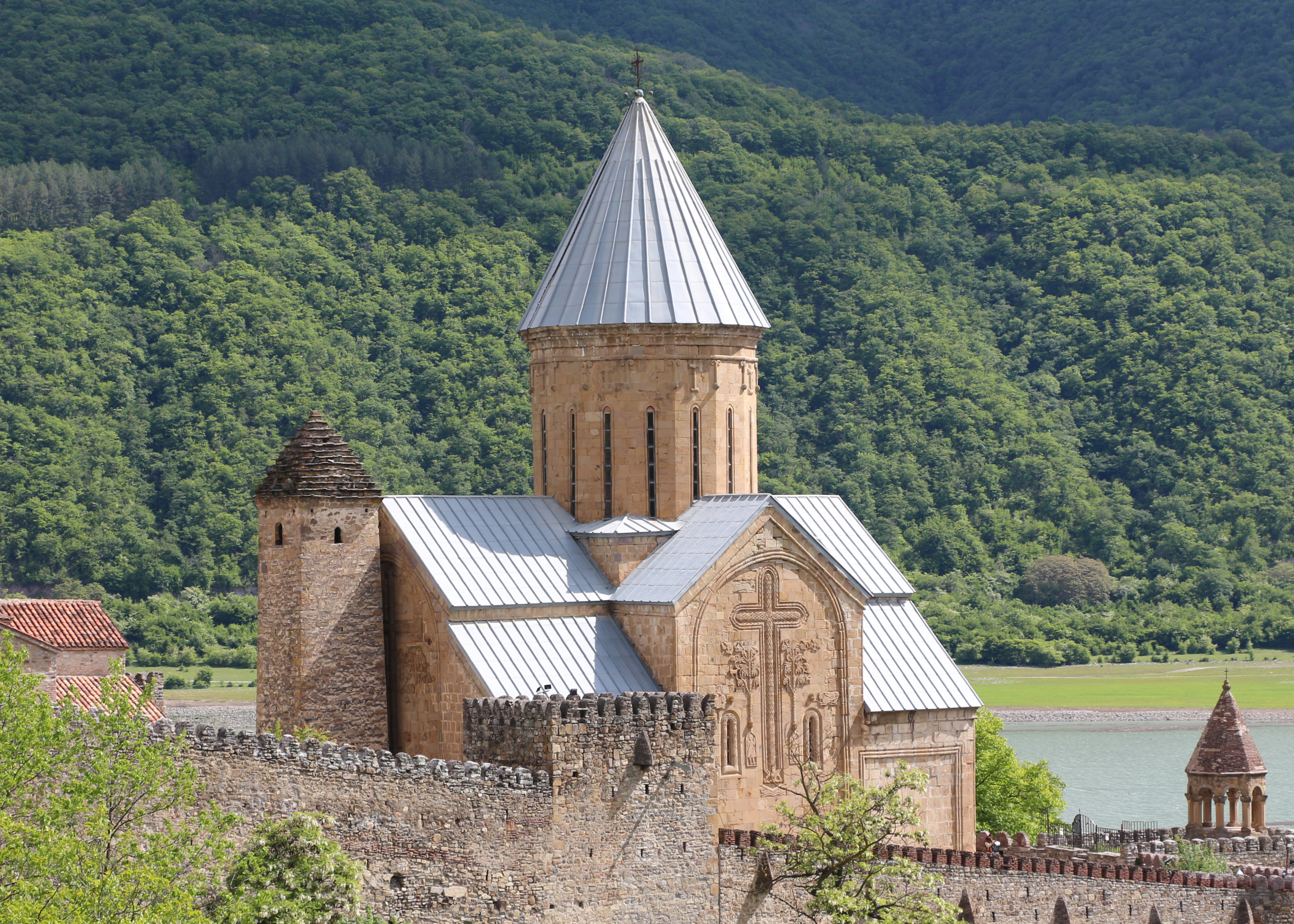
Church of the Mother of God

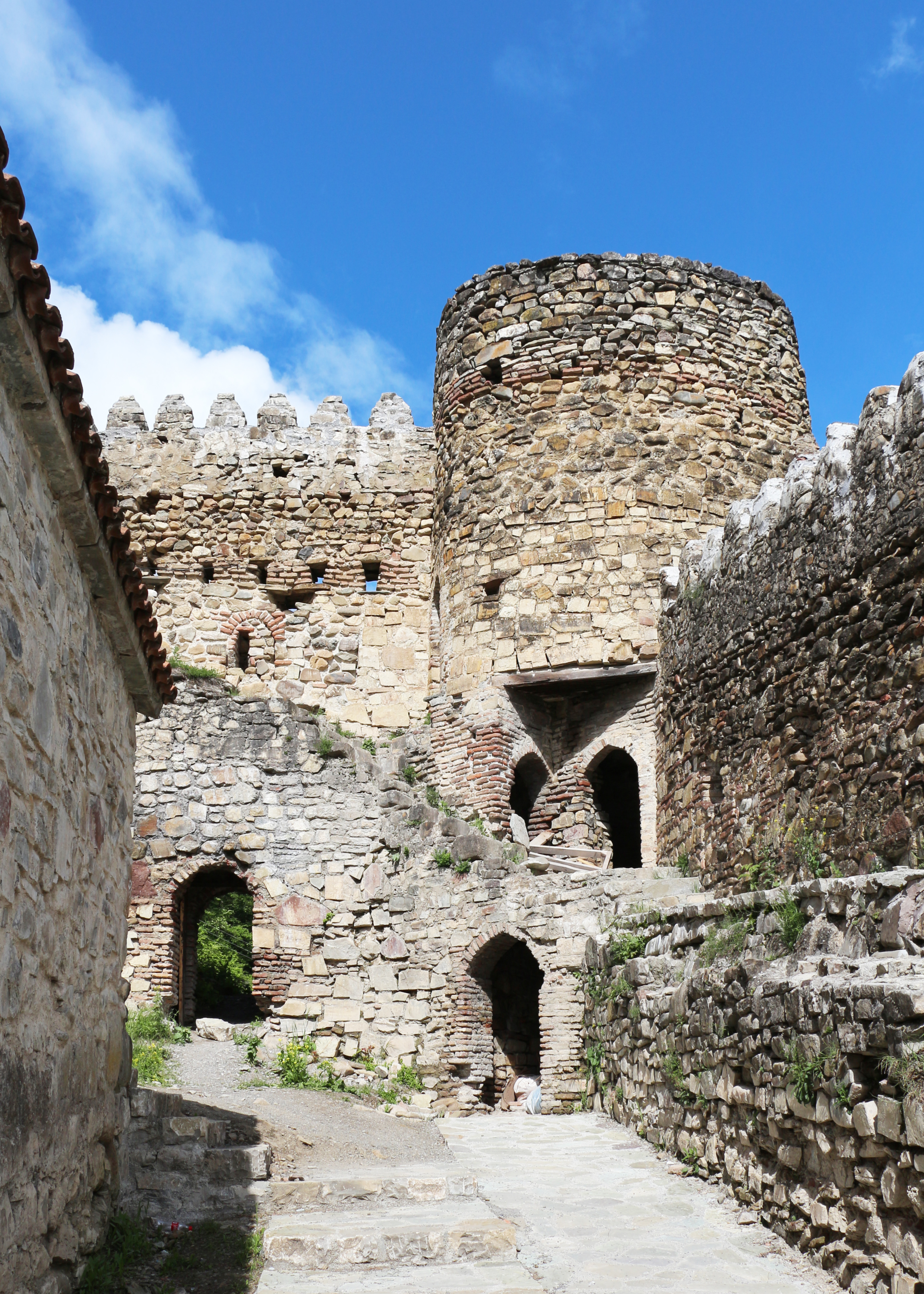
Walls of the fortress

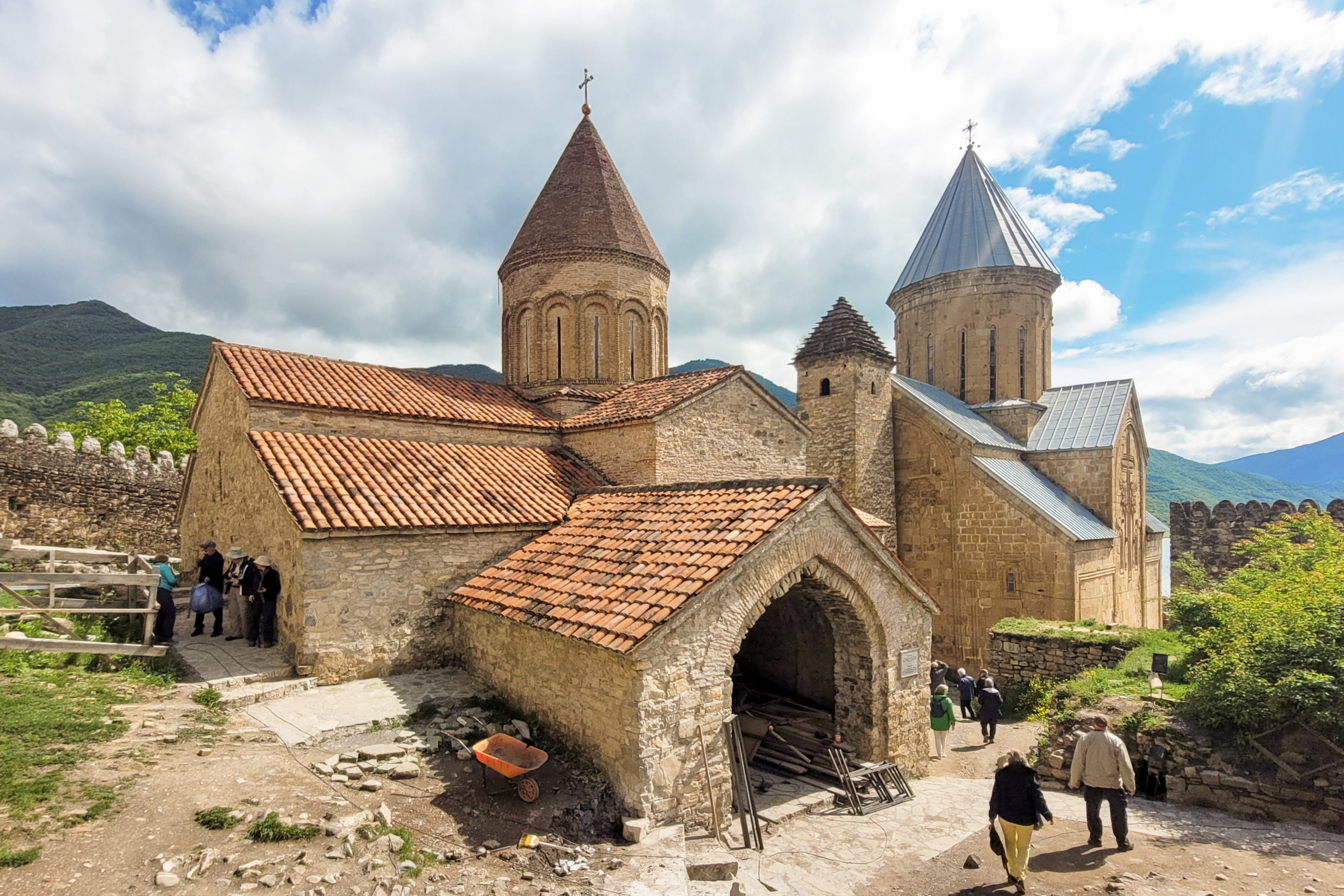
Inside the fortress

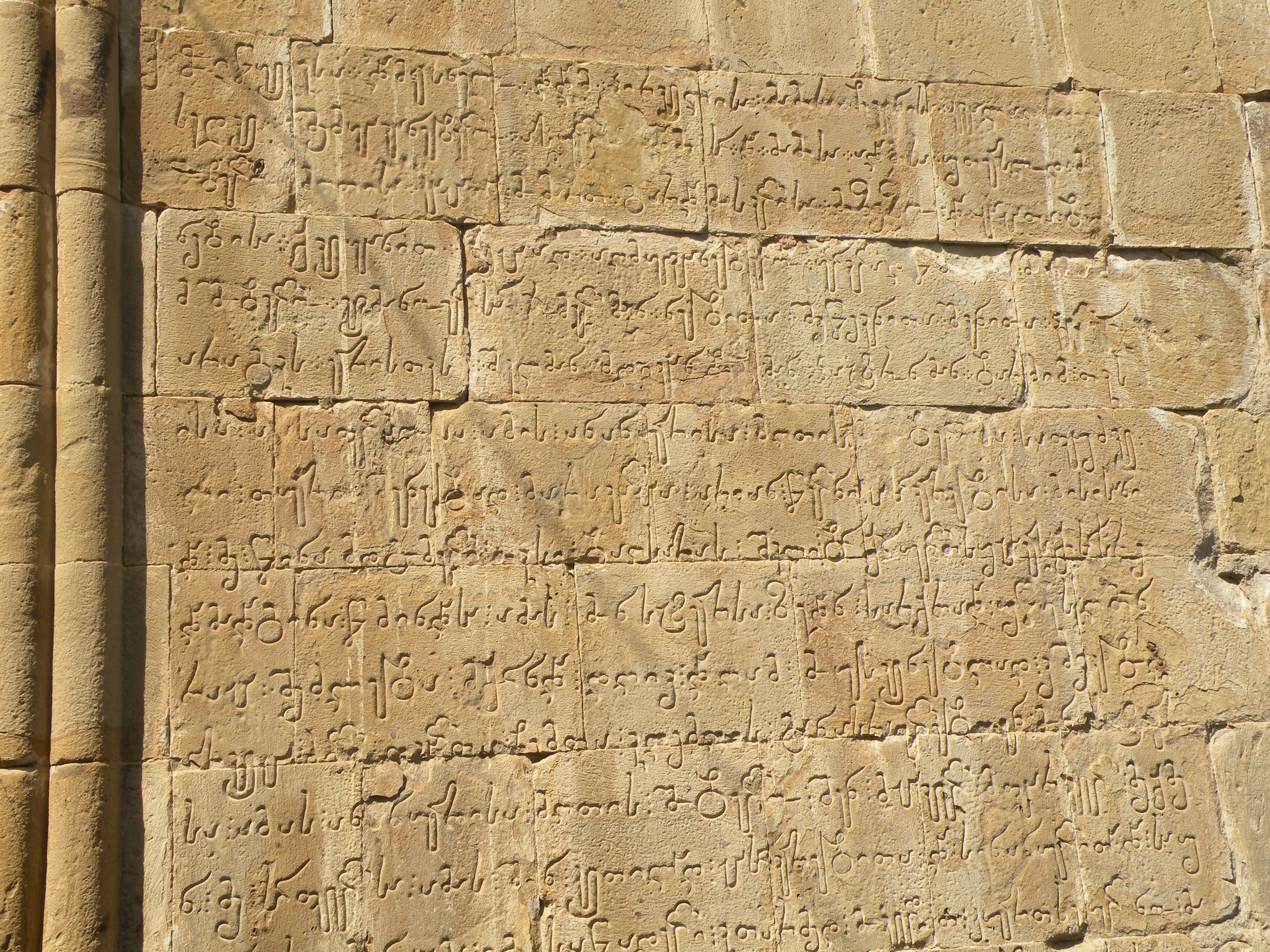
Inscriptions

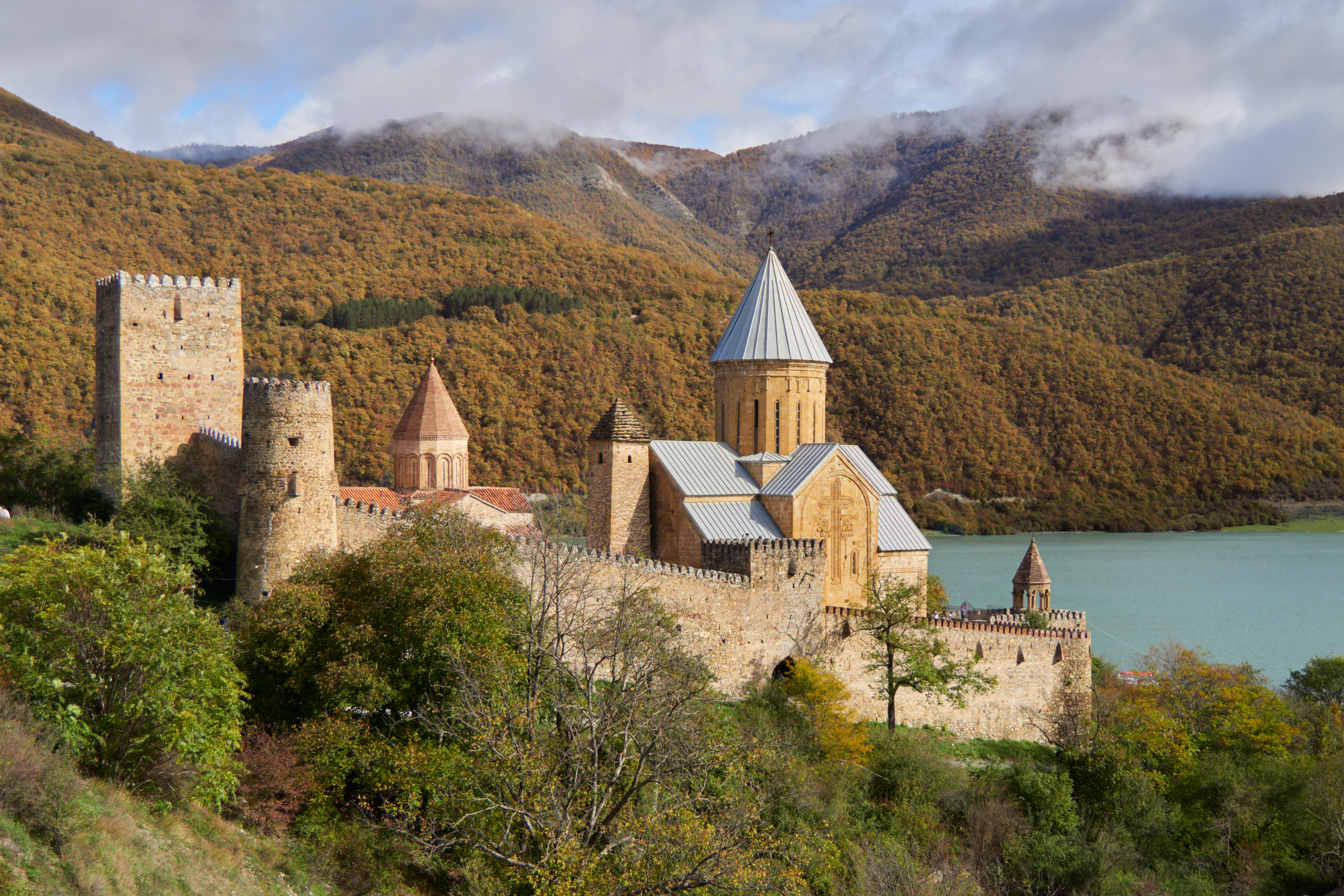
Ananuri Castle Complex
