= Fortified settlement of Mutso =

Medieval fortified settlement in Georgia

- მუცო - ციხე-სოფელი (Georgian)
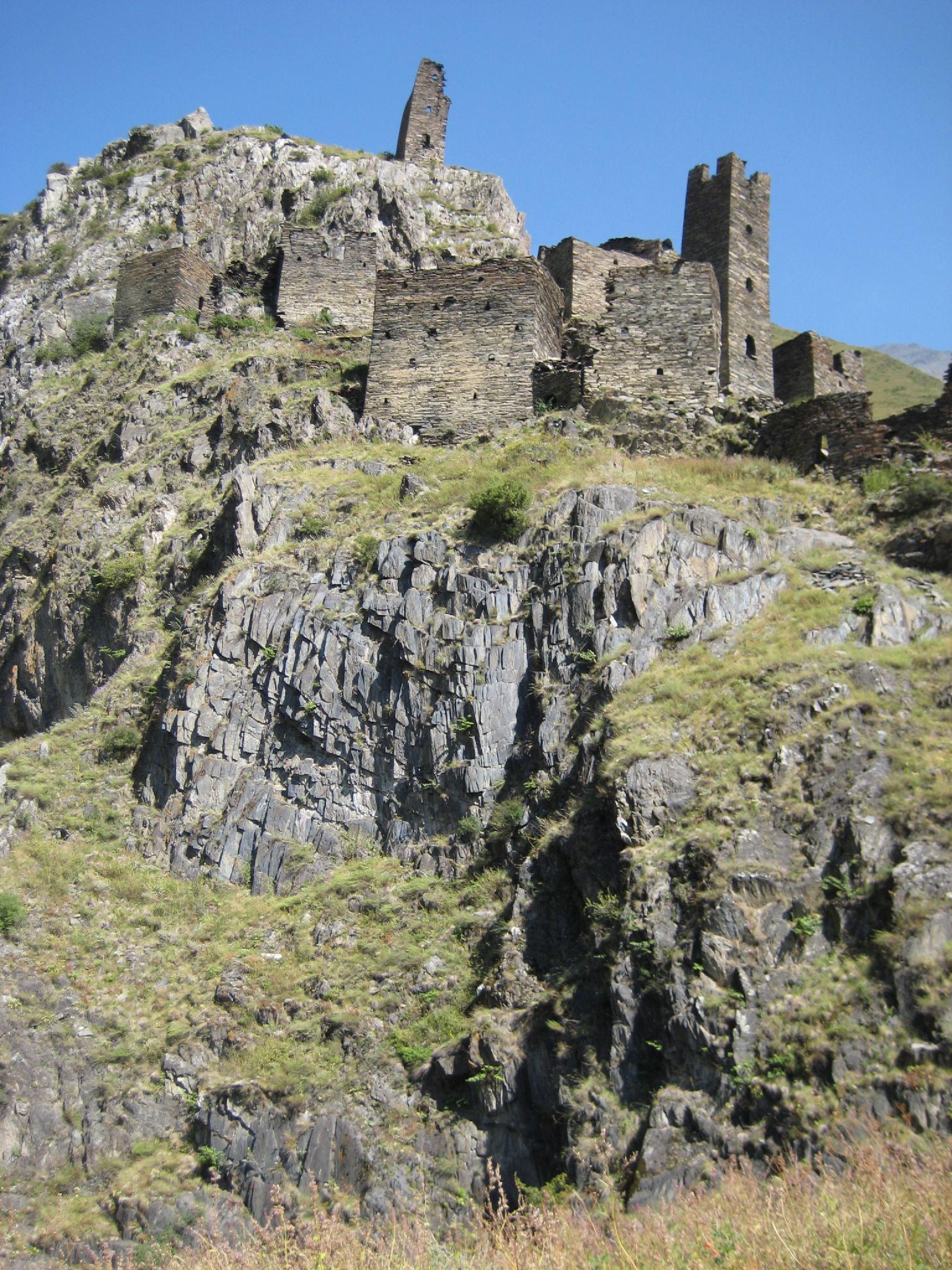
- Towers of the fortified settlement
- Interactive map of Fortified settlement of Mutso
- 42.607441°N 45.207917°E
- Type: Fortified settlement
- Periods: 10th–18th centuries
- Location: Mutso, Dusheti Municipality, Mtskheta-Mtianeti, Georgia

Site notes
- Material: Schist
- Condition: Preserved; partly rehabilitated
- Management: National Agency for Cultural Heritage Preservation of Georgia
- Website: www.heritagesites.ge/en/service/25

Immovable Cultural Monument of National Significance of Georgia
- Designated: 7 November 2006
- Reference no.: 2393

The fortified settlement of Mutso (მუცო - ციხე-სოფელი, literally “Mutso fortress-village”) is a medieval fortified settlement in the village of Mutso, Dusheti Municipality, Mtskheta-Mtianeti, Georgia. It occupies a rocky slope in the Ardoti River valley, in the historical region of Pirikita Khevsureti. The complex includes fortified dwellings, defensive towers and walls, shrines, a church and above-ground burial vaults.

In 2006, the Georgian government granted the complex the status of an immovable cultural monument of national significance. A rehabilitation programme launched in 2014 received a European Heritage Award / Europa Nostra Award in 2019 and later won the programme's Public Choice Award.

== Name and heritage status ==
In the annex to Presidential Decree No. 665 of 7 November 2006, the monument is listed as მუცო - ციხე-სოფელი, dated broadly to the Middle Ages and located at the village of Mutso in the Ardoti River valley. Archaeologist Ivane Tsiklauri used the form მიცუ (იგივე მუცო), meaning “Mitsu (the same as Mutso)”, in a 2008 study of abandoned settlements in Pirikita Khevsureti.

The protected historic complex is distinct from the officially recognised modern village of Mutso, which forms part of the Shatili administrative unit of Dusheti Municipality. The National Agency's museum-reserve page describes the fortified settlement as dating from the 10th to the 18th centuries.

== Setting and layout ==
The settlement extends over three semi-artificial terraces on a rocky mountain above the valley. Its surviving layout includes narrow passages, small open spaces and stone stairways connecting the buildings and different levels. The upper terrace is described as an acropolis and contains the principal shrine, a church and defensive towers.

According to Tsiklauri, the site was naturally inaccessible from three sides. The southern approach followed a narrow path across the rocky slope, partly reinforced by walls, while a double defensive wall protected the entrance from that direction. The study also records the remains of a water-supply system made of clay pipes, which carried water from a small western ravine towards the citadel.

== Architecture ==
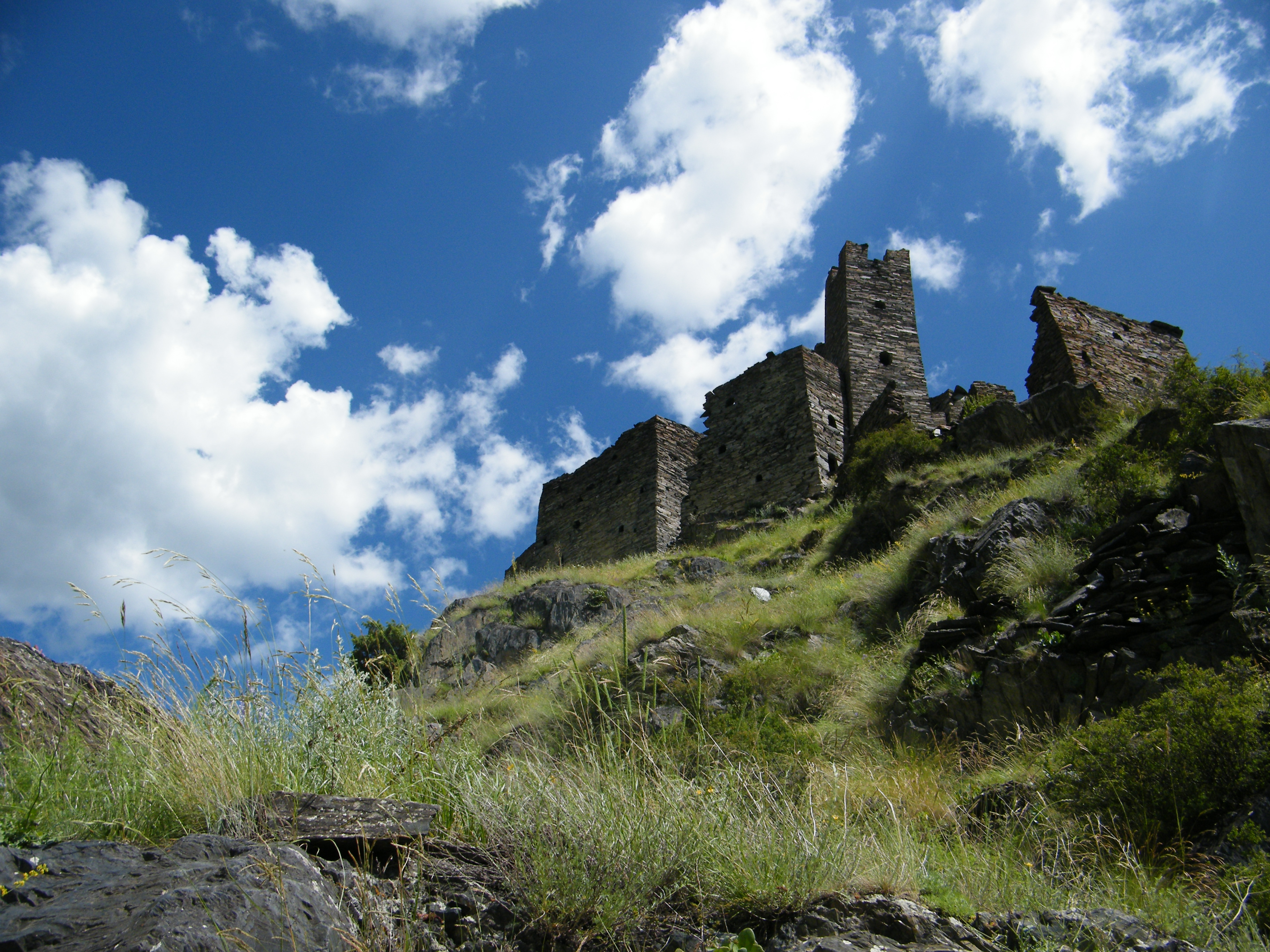
General view of the fortified settlement

The surviving complex contains fortified houses two to four storeys high and several defensive towers, together with defensive walls, shrines and burial vaults. Schist was the principal building material and was laid using a traditional dry-masonry technique.

In G. V. Demidov's 1931 ethnographic account, the old settlement was divided into three groups of fortifications, each arranged around a separate defensive tower and associated respectively with the Daiauri, Cholokashvili and Torghva clans. Each group was said to have had its own clan shrine, or khati (ხატი).

Named structures include the Borchashvili fortress-house, the shrine of Saint George of Broliskalo, Torghva's tower and fortress-house, and the Cholokaant tower and tower-house. Tsiklauri reported that some researchers dated towers equipped with openings for firearms to the 16th century, while noting that this did not date the beginning of occupation of the entire site.

== History ==
Europa Nostra states that Mutso was inhabited from at least the 10th century. It served as a northern outpost, controlling roads entering Georgia and defending the state border.

Nineteenth- and early twentieth-century accounts distinguished the fortified settlement on the upper slope from a smaller settlement of the same name at its foot. By the early 20th century, the upper settlement was largely deserted. Vladimir Gurko-Kryazhin called it a “dead city” in 1928, while V. N. Khudadov described it as a “dead castle” in 1931.

According to Europa Nostra, depopulation was complete by the middle of the 20th century. The organisation attributed the decline to the harsh climate, shortage of arable land and water, weak infrastructure and the subsequent lack of maintenance of the buildings.

== Rehabilitation and awards ==
In 2014, the National Agency for Cultural Heritage Preservation of Georgia began a rehabilitation programme with support from the Georgian government, other state institutions and the International Charity Foundation Cartu. Residents were consulted during planning and were involved in preparatory, technical and maintenance work.

The local practice of dry schist masonry had almost disappeared. Kist craftsmen from a neighbouring region trained local workers in the technique. A track and cable system was installed to move construction materials up the mountain, and a small hydroelectric plant was built on a nearby river to supply power. The works improved the structural stability of the complex and enabled some dwellings to be reused; electricity and communications were also provided. The National Agency established a museum-reserve on the site for its day-to-day management.

The project received a 2019 European Heritage Award / Europa Nostra Award in the Conservation and Adaptive Reuse category. It later placed first in the public vote and received the 2019 Public Choice Award; approximately 8,500 people took part in the vote.

== Folklore ==
Torghva's tower

Torghva's tower (თორღვას კოშკი) is associated with a cycle of Khevsur and Pshav traditions. The accounts differ over Torghva's origin and role, portraying him variously as a warrior and ruler or as a raider who exacted tribute. In a widely recorded narrative, the Pshav Chota (or Chotla) kills Torghva after the latter loses a magical coat of mail.

Another tradition attributes the construction of Mutso to Torghva and says that stones were passed hand to hand in a human chain from Anatori to the rock. This is a folkloric account rather than a documented history of construction.

== Burial vaults ==
Above-ground stone burial vaults, known in Georgian as akldama (აკლდამა), survive within the fortified settlement and at the foot of the slope. They are comparable to the burial structures at Anatori. The vaults are small stone buildings with narrow openings; human remains were placed on the floor and on stone benches projecting from the walls. Similar above-ground crypts are known from other highland areas of the central Caucasus.

Burial vaults at Mutso

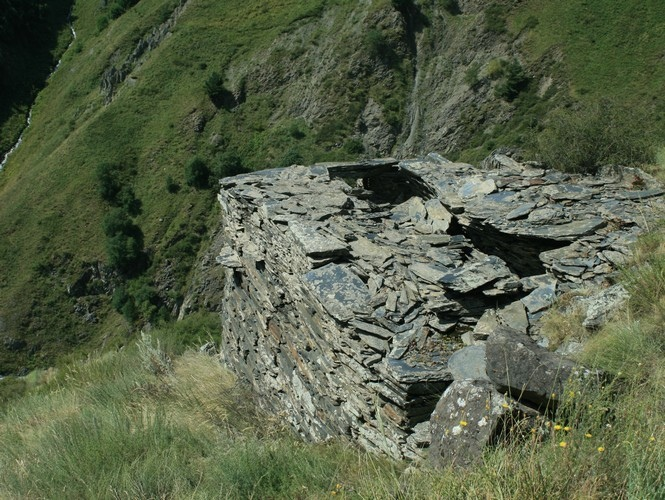

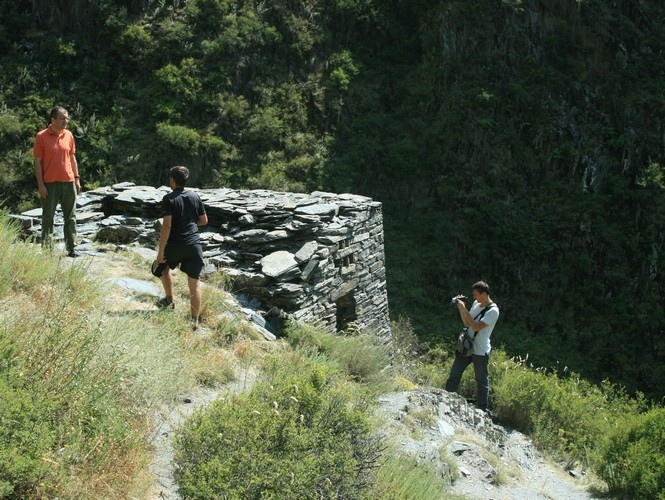

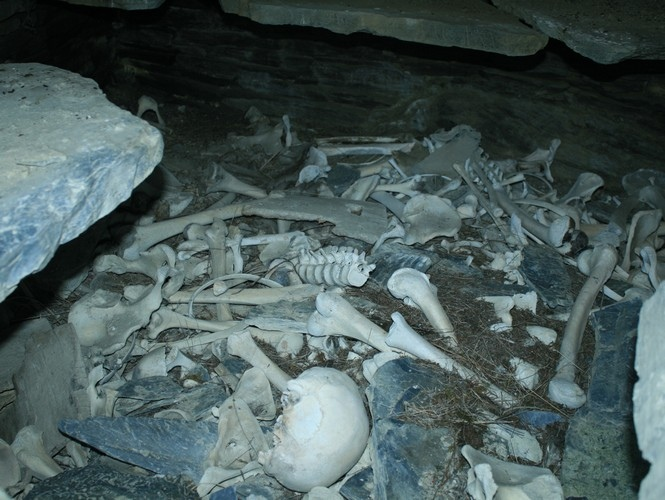

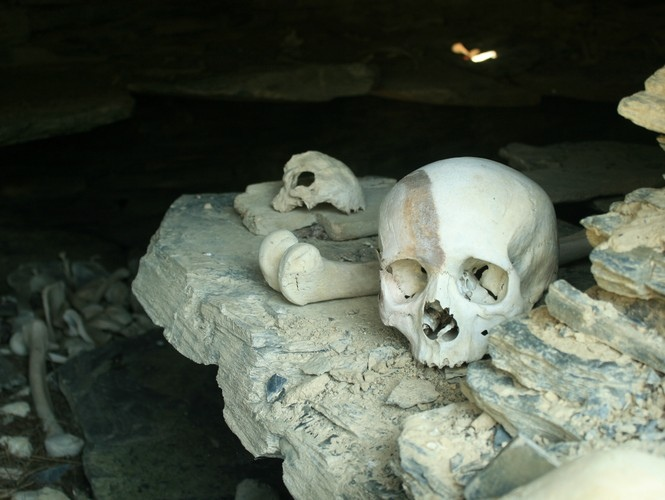

== See also ==
- Mutso
- Shatili
- Anatori
- Vainakh tower architecture
- List of fortifications in Georgia (country)
