= Argun River =

Argun River may refer to

- Argun River (Caucasus), in Georgia and Russia
- Argun River (Asia), part of the Russia–China border
