= Khonischala =

Khonischala ხონისჭალა
- Village
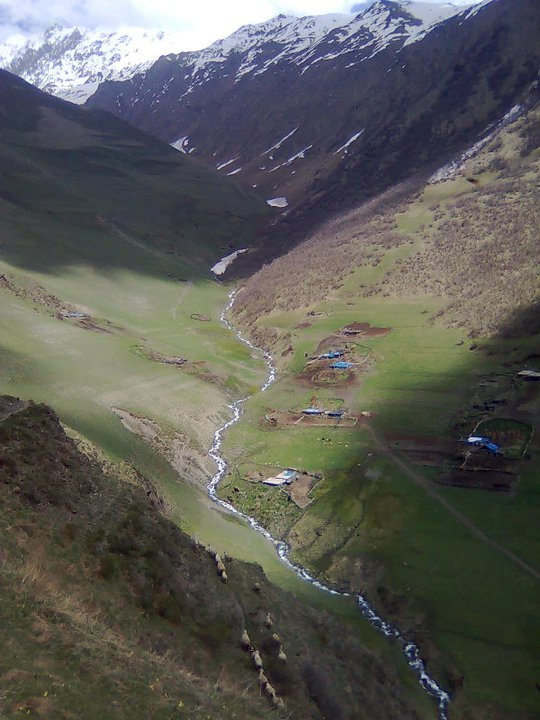
- Khonischala village

- Location in Georgia Khonischala (Georgia)
- Coordinates: 42°35′05″N 45°12′51″E
- Country: Georgia
- Region: Mtskheta-Mtianeti
- Municipality: Dusheti
- Elevation: 1,200 m (3,900 ft)

Population (2014)
  - Total: 3
- Time zone: UTC+4 (Georgian Time)

Khonischala (Georgian: ხონისჭალა) are two villages settled by the Shetekauri’s family (Khone for winter, and Khonischala for summer period). Villages are located in Dusheti District on the northern slope of Tushet-Khevsusreti part of the Caucasus mountain range, at 1200-1300 meter above the sea level, 138 km distance from Dusheti.

== Legend ==
The icon of Archangel has been considered as the main patron of the village Mutso during the centuries. The icon was kept on the mount Daquekhi (Georgian: დაქუეხი) (mountain Tebulosmta, Georgian: თბულოსმთა) which is always covered by snow. People of the village were not able to go to the icon and pray there. They sacrificed an ox and asked the icon to come down to a more accessible place. The icon heard the prayer and moved to a holy place in Khone. After that, people started praying there.

Archangel was saving his village from black death (plague; Georgian: ჟამნი) One infected man ran out naked from another village and swam through the river of Khone. Then he came to the icon, prayed and was healed. People of Mutso who heard this escaped the disease to Knone. They were chased by the plague, but they outstripped it to the village and were saved.

That's how people of Mutso survived.

== See also ==
- Mtskheta-Mtianeti
- Mutso
- Shetekauri
