= Shetekauri =

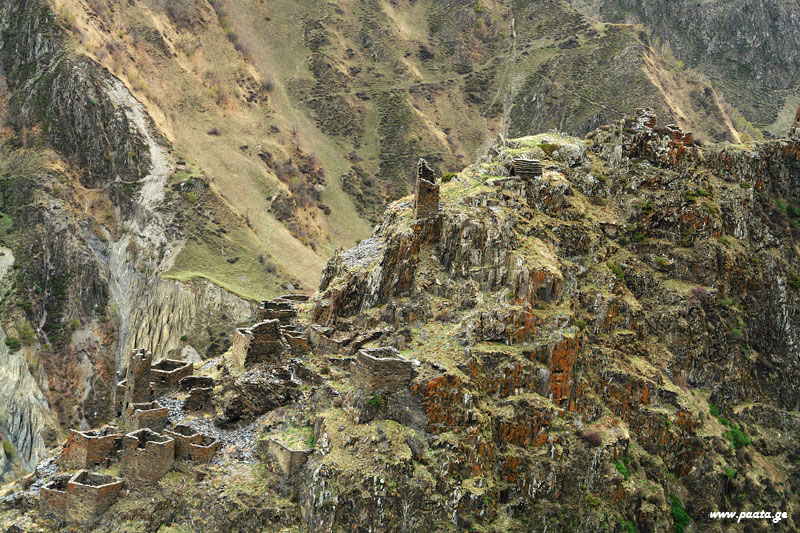
The village of Mutso

Shetekauri (Georgian: შეთეკაური) is a Georgian family from Khevsureti.

== Origins ==
Supposedly it was derived from a man's name Shete. The representatives of one of the smallest families of Georgia (apr. 300 person) reside mostly in Kakheti region. The historical documents do not store any information about the family until the 20th century. However, folklore and especially local legends provide quite rich stories connected to this family. The Shetekauris are originally from the mountainous village – Mutso. As the legend puts it “the Shetekauris dug Mutso”, which indirectly indicates that the family founded the village or the family history started together with the founding of Mutso.

== Legend of Mutso foundation ==
As legend has it Mutso was founded by five brothers. The Shetekauris family comes from Vardana, who was one of the brother. Another's name was Choloka (Cholokha in the Georgian language means lame), whose descendants moved to Kakheti and changed their family name into Cholokashvili. Third brother escaped his deadly enemies to Tusheti (in Georgian mountain villages vengeance was tradition) and their family name is Uzgharauli. Fourth brother did not get married and, thus, did not have descendants. From the generations of the fifth brother Torghva – a legendary hero from Mutso – was born.

== See also ==
- Mutso
- Khone
