= List of forts in Georgia =

List of forts in Georgia may refer to:

- List of fortifications in Georgia (country)
- List of forts in Georgia (U.S. state)
