= Narikala =

Ancient fortress overlooking Tbilisi, Georgia (country)

- ნარიყალა
- Tbilisi in Georgia
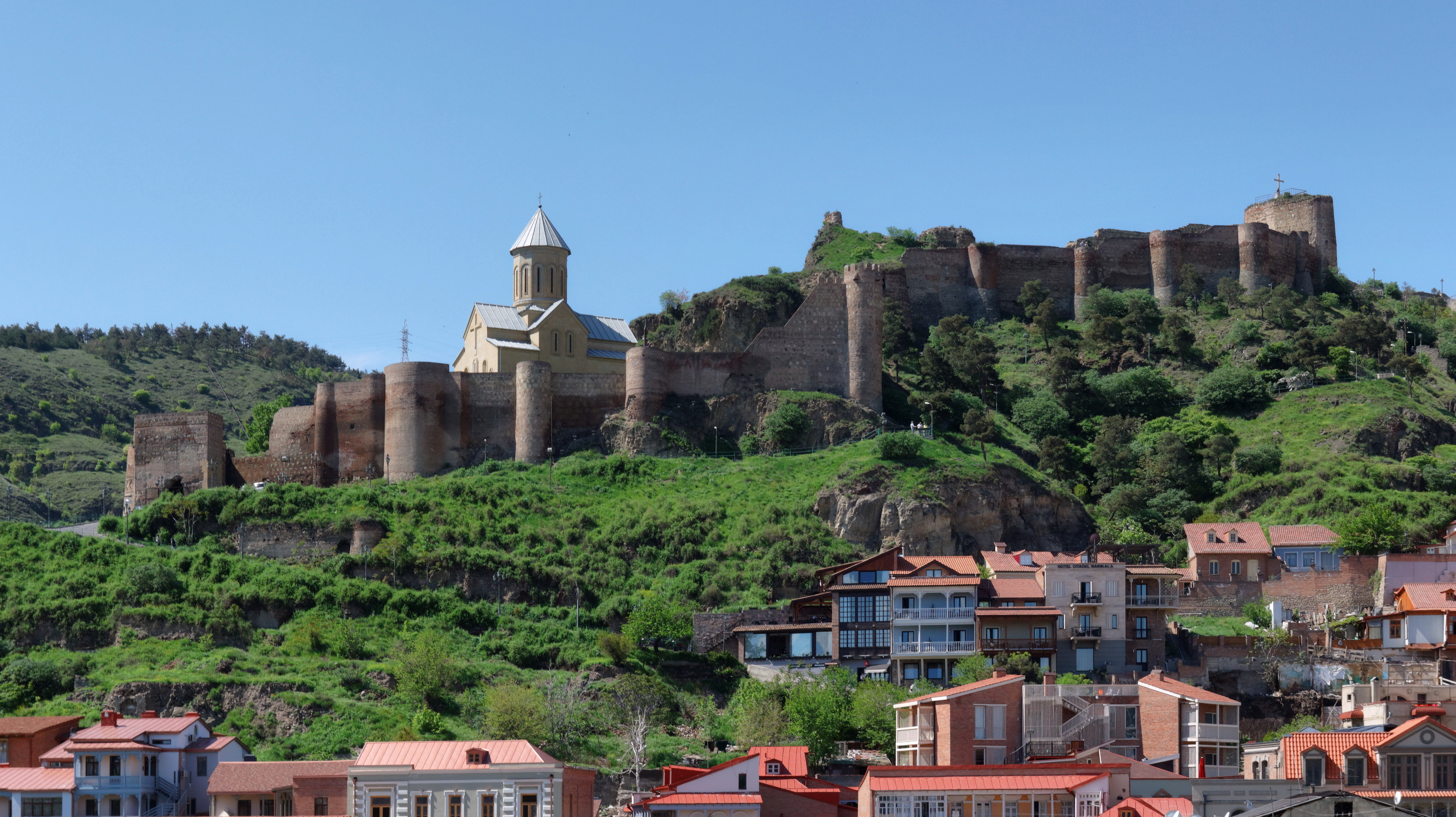
- Narikala, with parts of Old Town seen below

Site information
- Type: Fortress
- Open to the public: Open
- Condition: Ruined

Location
- Coordinates: 41°41′16″N 44°48′31″E

Site history
- Built: 4th Century
- Materials: Stones and Brick

Airfield information
- Elevation: 383 metres (1,257 ft) AMSL

Cultural Heritage Monument of Georgia
- Official name: Narikala
- Designated: October 1, 2007; 18 years ago
- Reference no.: 4696
- Item Number in Cultural Heritage Portal: 3616
- Date of entry in the registry: October 11, 2007; 18 years ago
- Accounting Card / Passport #: 010506503

Narikala (Georgian: ნარიყალა, pronounced [naɾiχʼaɫa]) is an ancient fortress overlooking Tbilisi, the capital of Georgia, and the Mtkvari (Kura) River. The fortress consists of two walled sections on a steep hill between the sulfur baths and the botanical gardens of Tbilisi. On the lower court there is the recently restored St Nicholas church. Newly built in 1996–1997, it replaces the original 13th-century church that was destroyed in a fire. The new church is of "prescribed cross" type, having doors on three sides. The internal part of the church is decorated with the frescos showing scenes from both the Bible and the history of Georgia.

== History ==
According to the legend, it was built by the king Vakhtang I Gorgasali of the ancient Kingdom of Iberia.

Archaeological studies of the region have, however, revealed that the territory of Tbilisi was settled by humans as early as the 4th millennium BC. The earliest written accounts of settlement of the location come from the second half of the 4th century AD, when a fortress was built during King Varaz-Bakur's reign (ca. 364). Towards the end of the 4th century, the fortress fell into the hands of the Persians, but was recaptured by the kings of Kartli by the middle of the 5th century. It was considerably expanded by the Umayyads in the 7th century and by king David the Builder (1089–1125), respectively. The Mongols renamed it the "Narin Qala" (i.e., "Little Fortress"). Most of the extant fortifications date from the 16th and 17th centuries. Rostom, the Safavid-appointed vali/king of Kartli, fortified the surroundings of the fortress and transferred control of the fortress to the Iranians. In 1827, parts of the fortress were damaged by an earthquake, and were subsequently demolished.

== Gallery ==
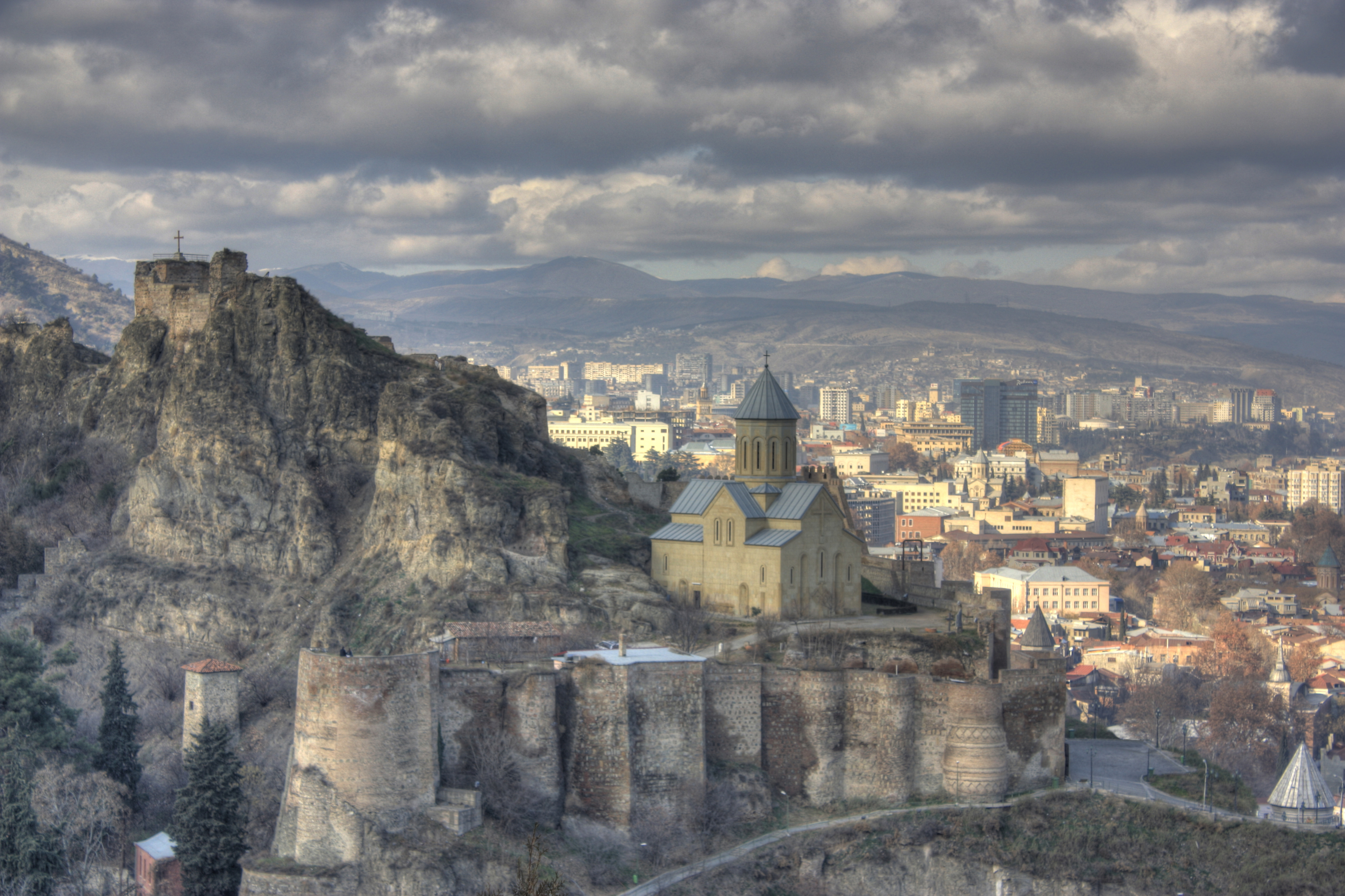

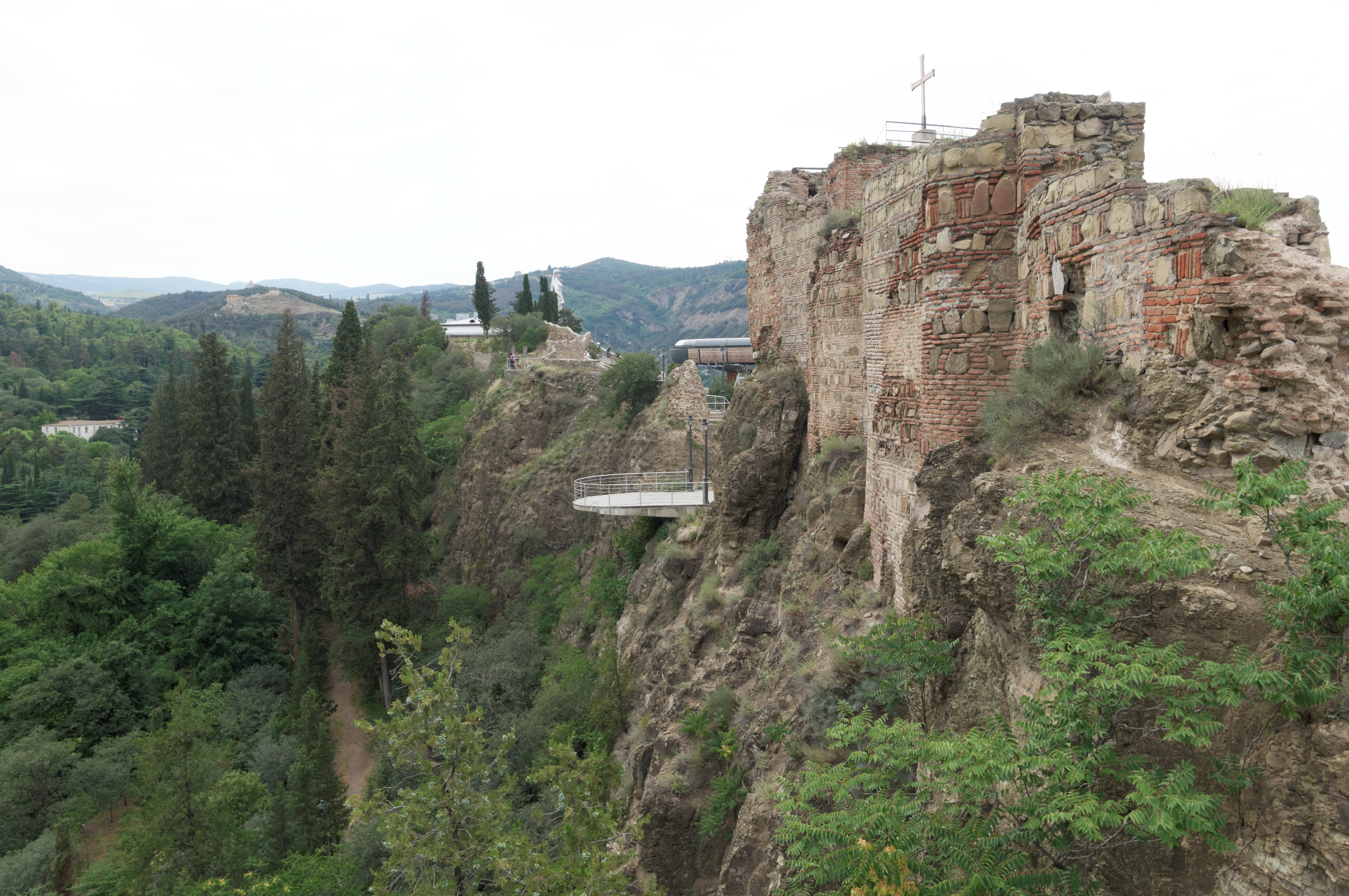

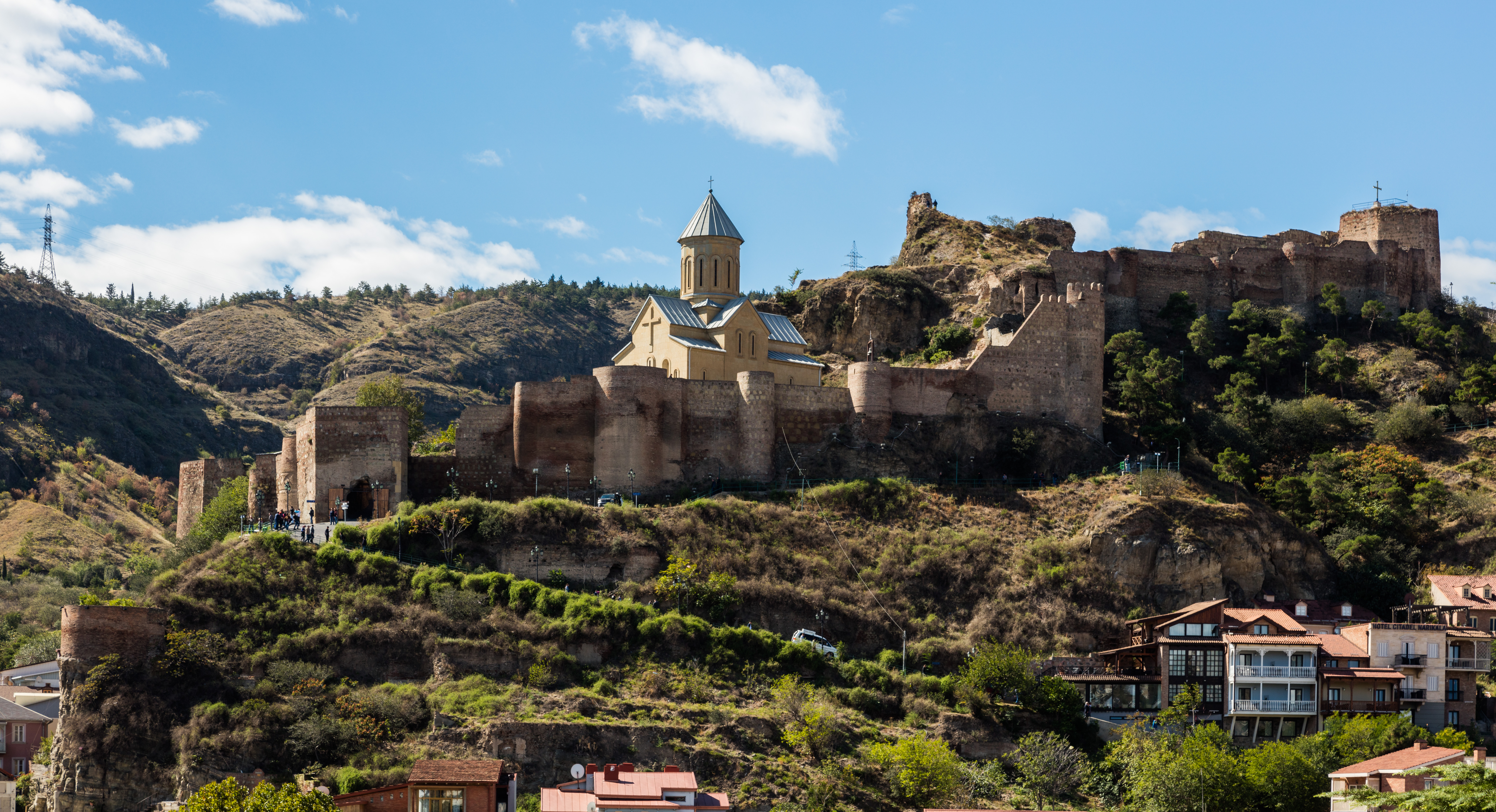
View from the center of Tbilisi.

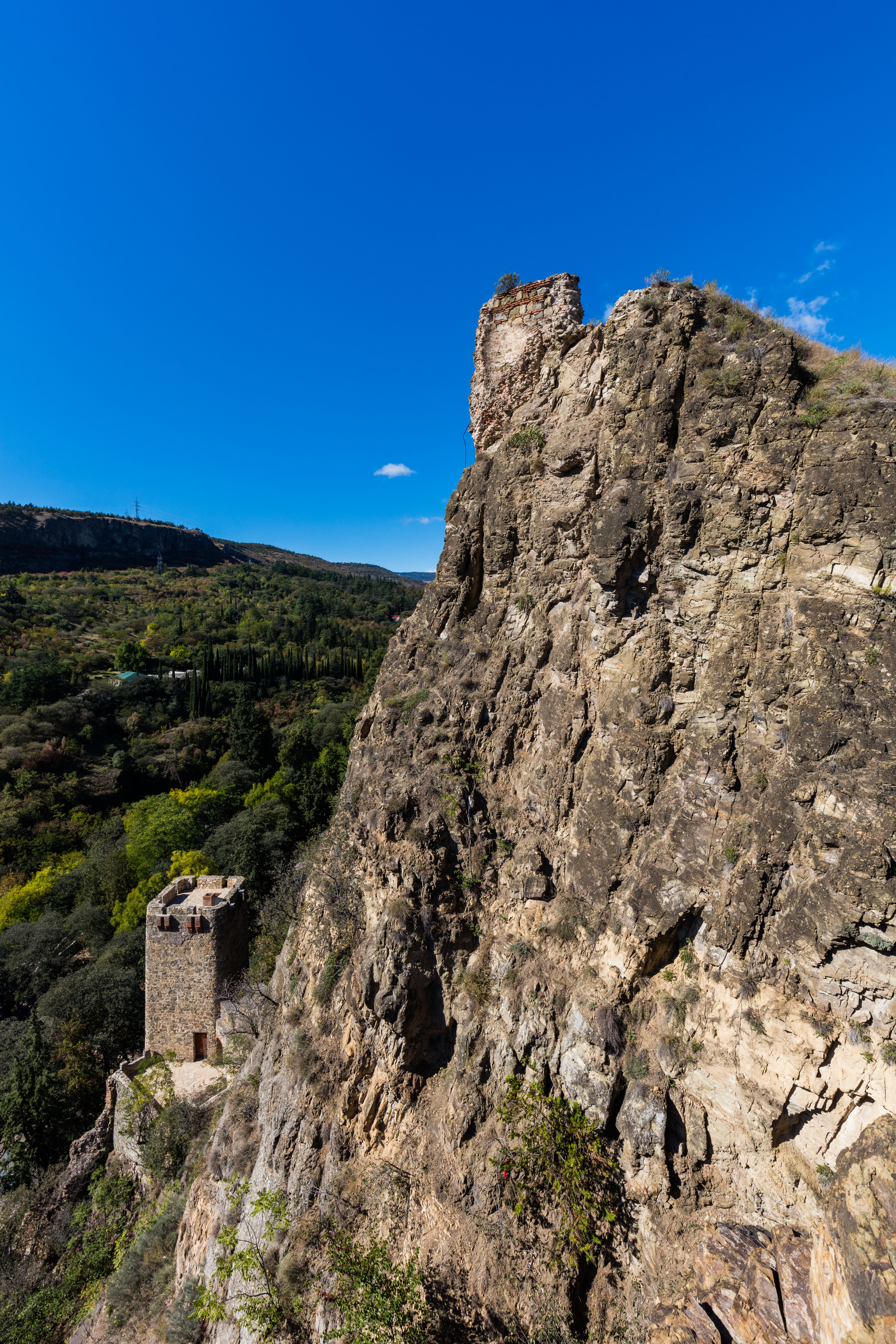
Wall at the rear part of the fortress.

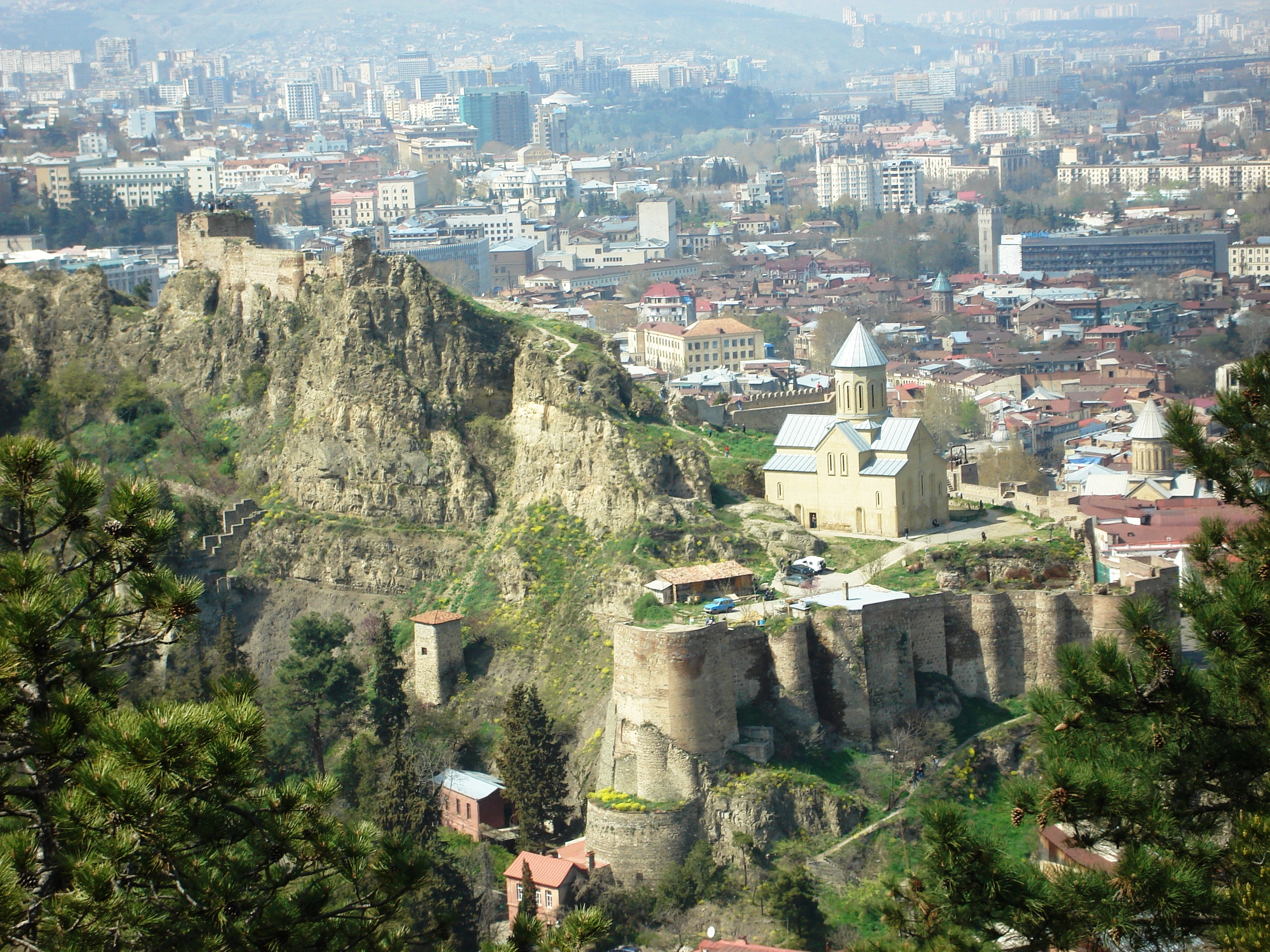

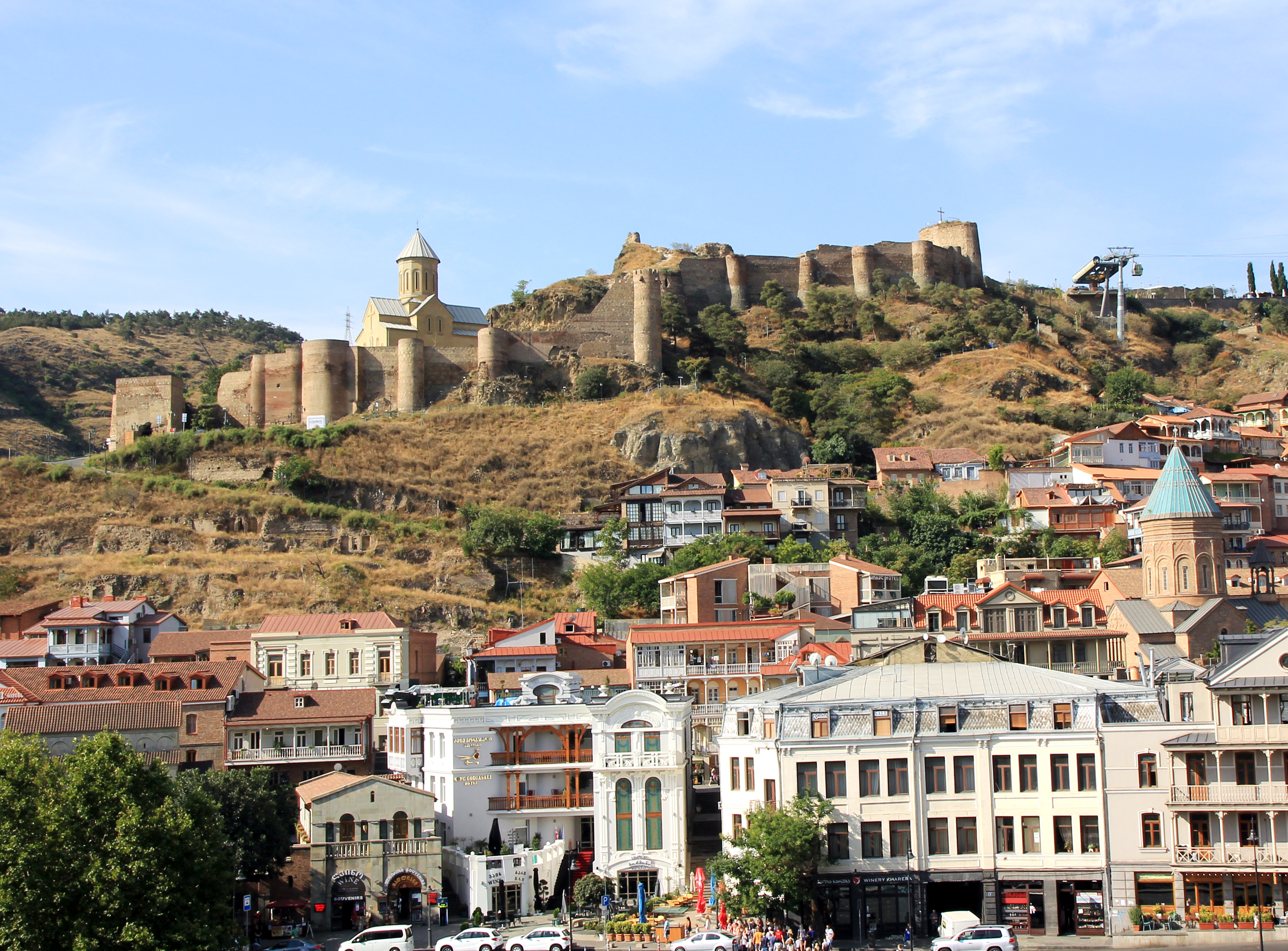

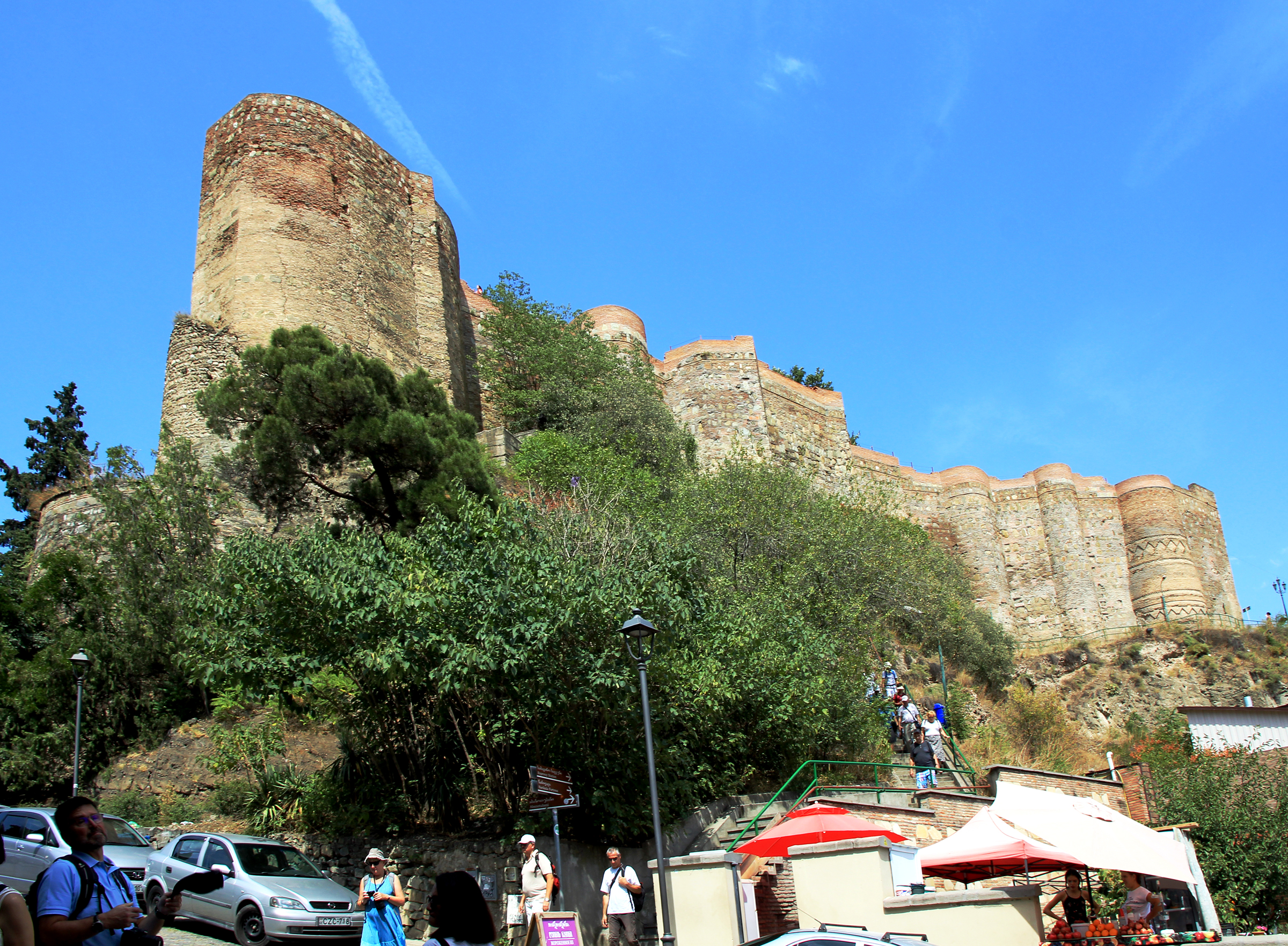

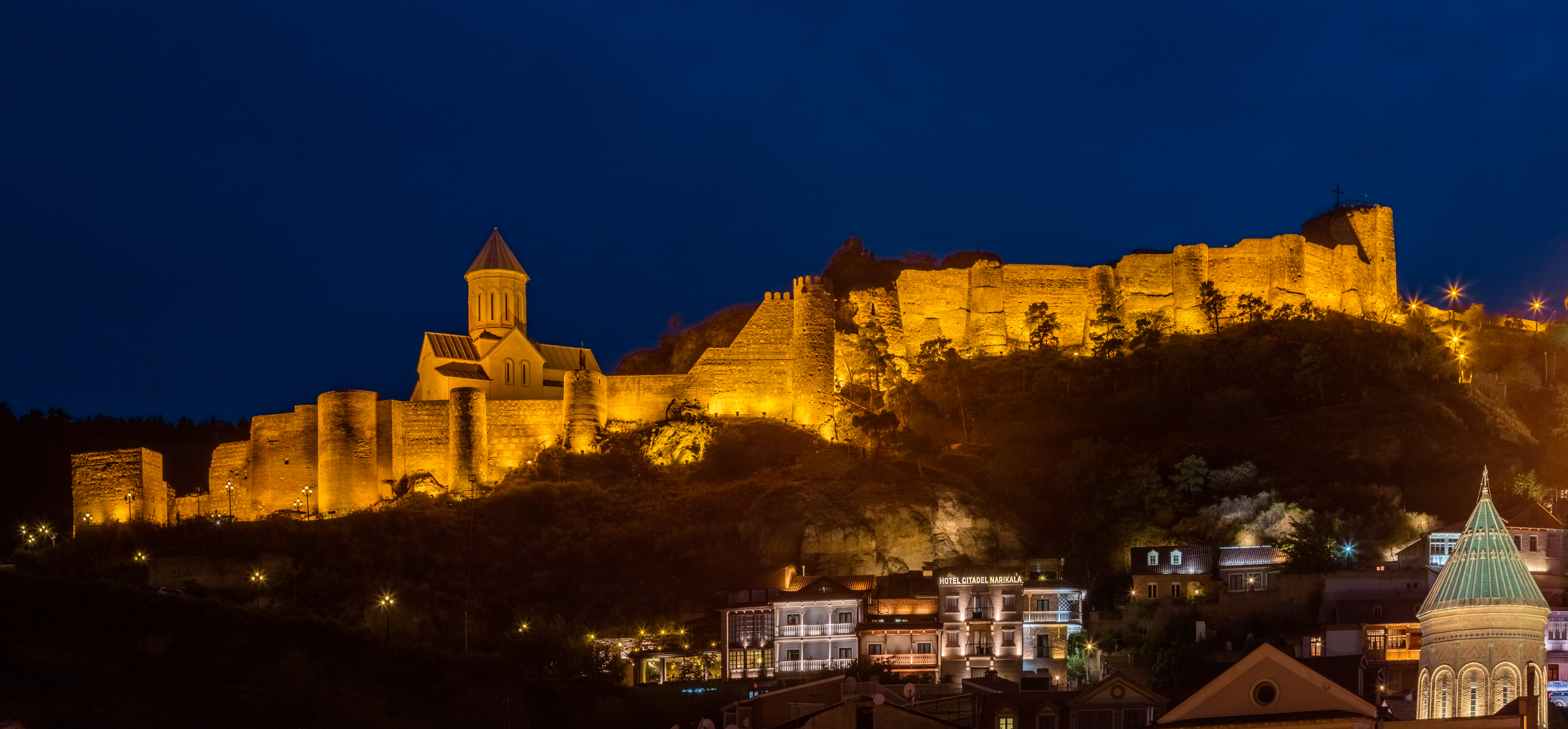
View by night.

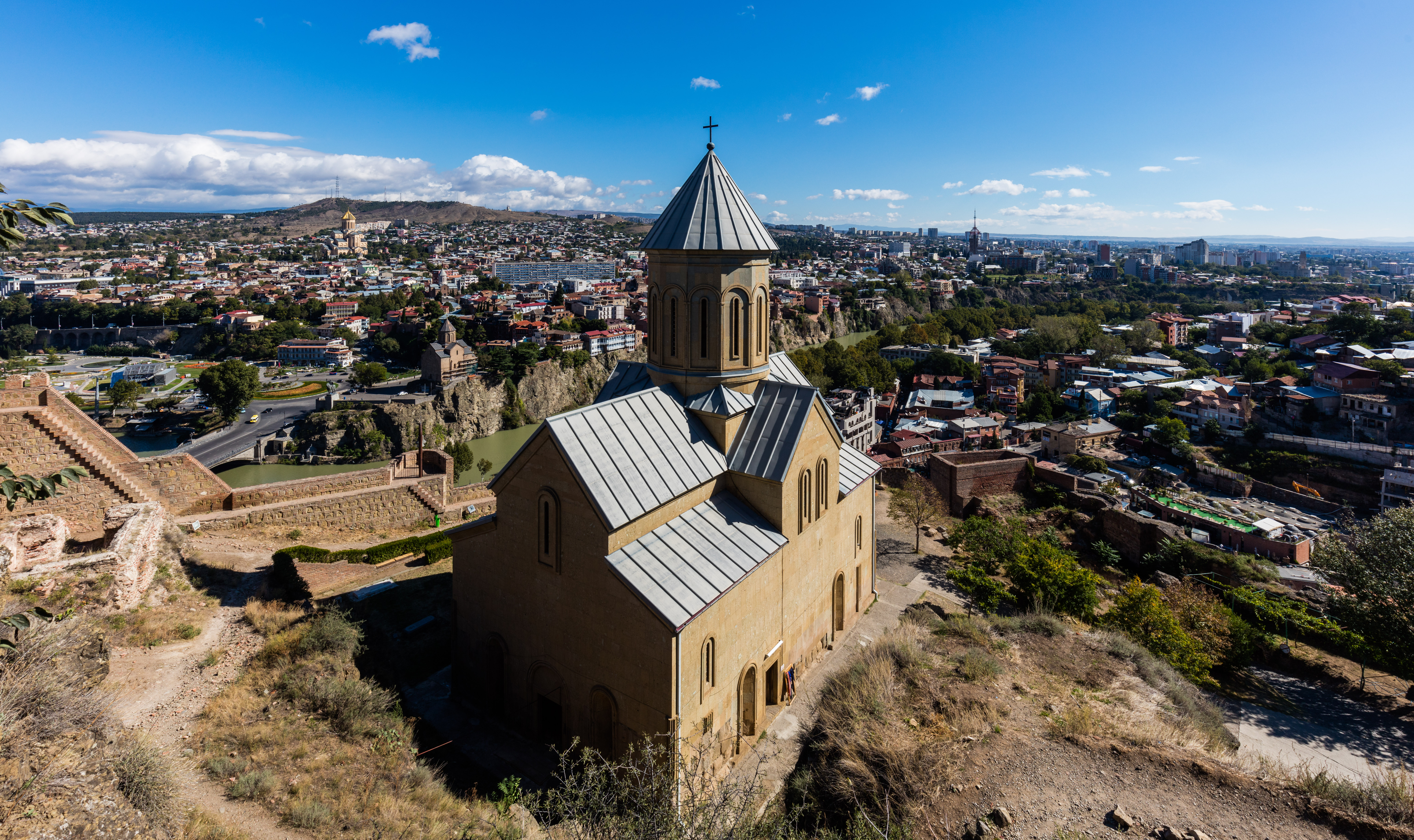
St Nicholas church.

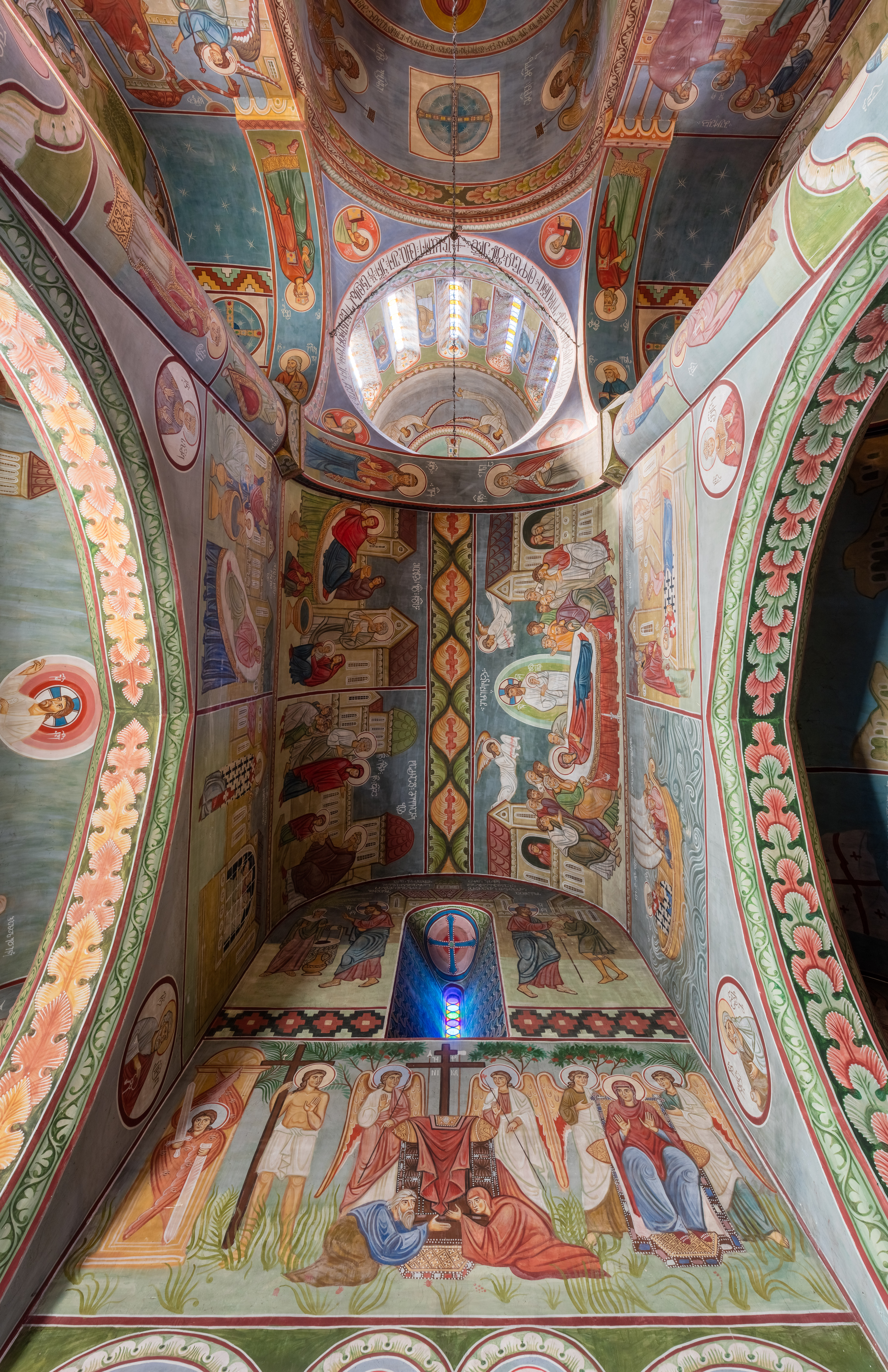
Interior of St Nicholas church.

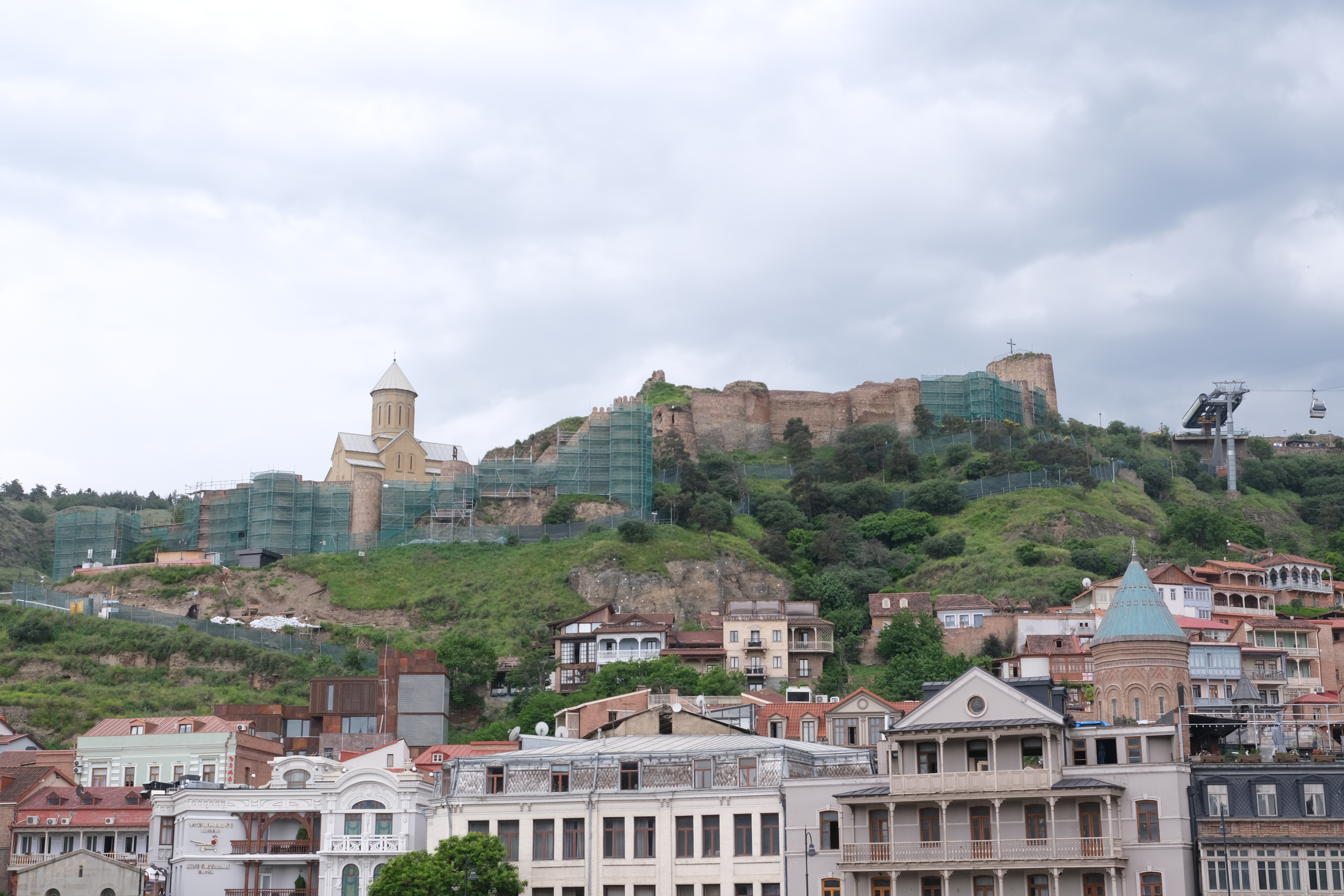
View of Narikala during 2025 conservation work
