= List of fortifications in Georgia (country) =

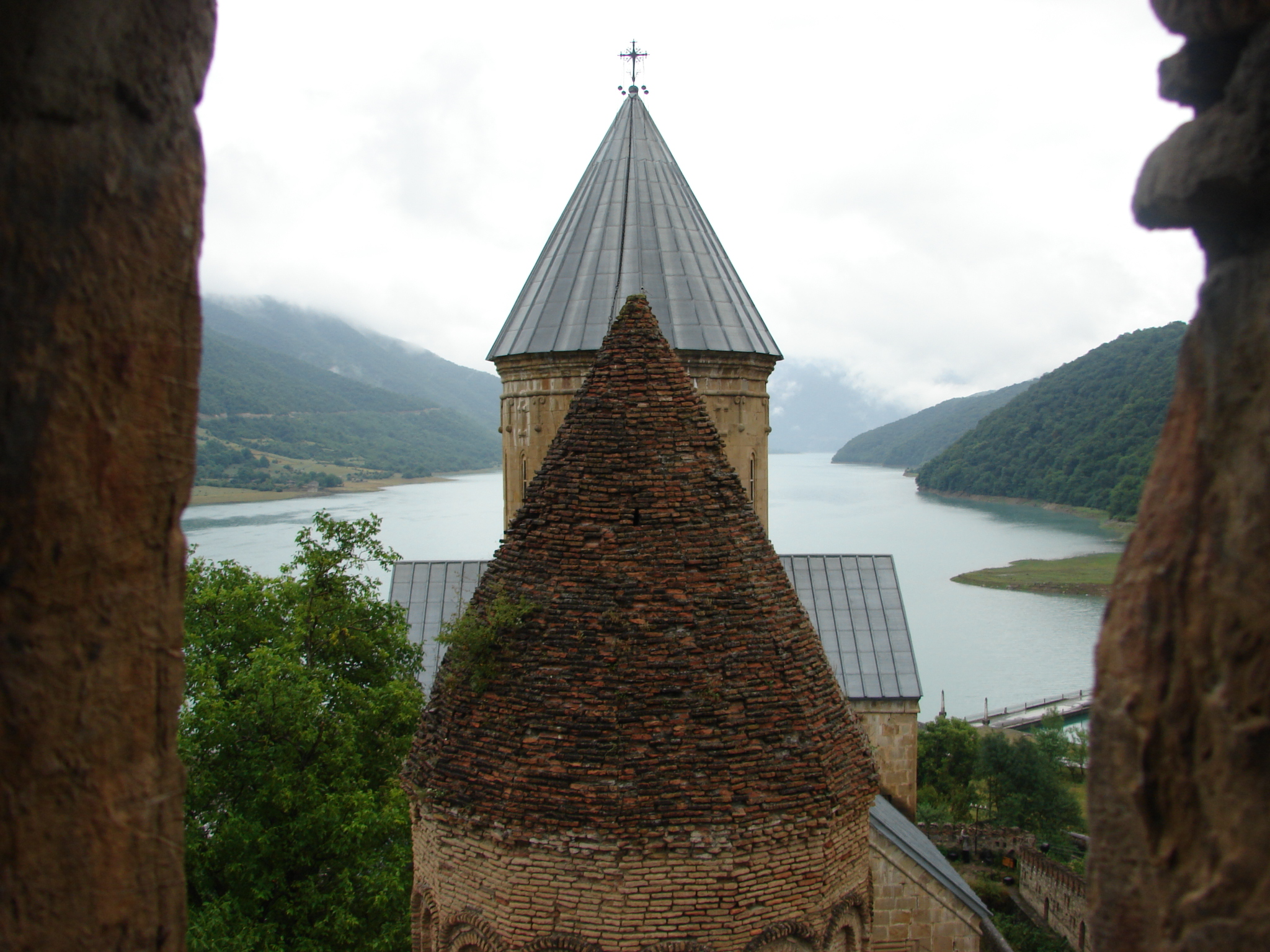
View from the tower at Ananuri

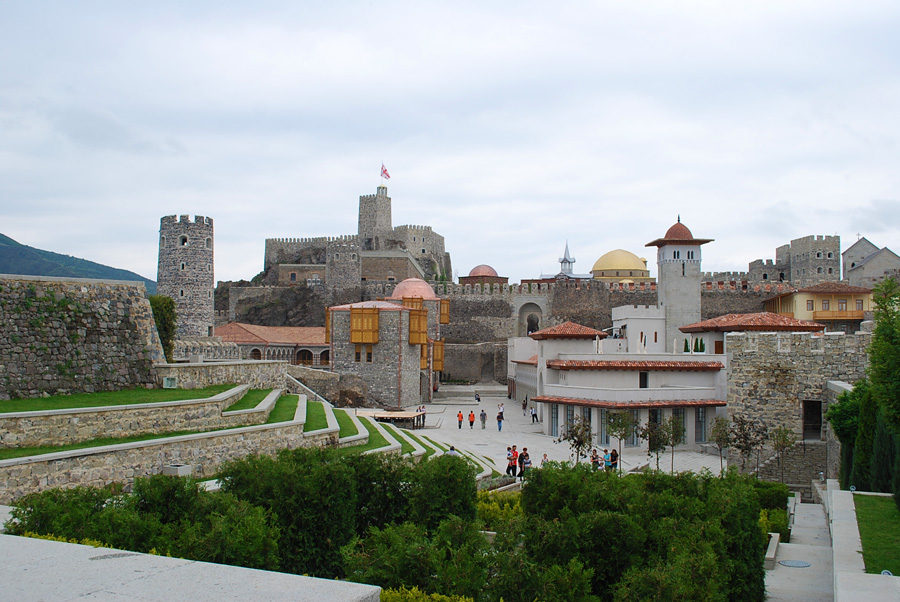
Rabati, Akhaltsikhe, Georgia

There are over 100 castles and forts in Georgia, which were constructed between the years 800 and 1700 by various provincial kings. The castles and forts have long been abandoned, but most are still standing, and some are preserved by UNESCO.

The earliest castle in Georgia was the Ananuri castle, which was built in the period from 1200–1249. The Ananuri castle consisted of two castles with a big curtain wall surrounding them. It was the seat of the dukes of the Duchy of Aragvi, which was one of multiple feudal dynasties during the period.

The last castle to be built in Georgia was the Rabati Castle, which was built between 1250 and 1299. The original town was built from 700–800, with the castle being built in the 1260s. From the 1260s to the 1340s, the castle and the surrounding town were the capital cities of the province of Samtskhe-Saatabago, which was ruled by the House of Jaqeli.

The forts of Georgia lie in varying states of ruin. The oldest was built in the 9th century, while some were built as late as the 17th century. While many still stand, most have been heavily damaged by various causes.

== Citadel Tbilisi ==
Tbilisi

== Castles ==
Castles in Georgia
Castle name	Location	Time built	Notes	Reference
Ananuri	On the Aragvi river, 72 km (45 mi) from Tbilisi	1200–1249		
Rabati Castle	At the town of Akhaltsikhe, Georgia	1250–1300	Originally called Lomisa Castle before the Ottoman conquest.	

== Forts and fortresses ==
Forts and fortresses in Georgia
Fort name	Location	Time built	Notes	Reference
Atskuri Fortress	30 km (19 mi) from Borjomi	900–999		
Bakhtrioni	Kakheti region, left bank of the Alazani river	1650s		
Birtvisi	Tetritsqaro Municipality	1038		
Gagi Fortress	near the town of Marneuli	unknown		
Gori Fortress	Overlooking the city of Gori	1200–1299		
Gremi	Kakheti region, 175 km (109 mi) from Tbilisi	1600–1699		
Keselo	Tusheti region, overlooking the village of Omalo	1230s		
Khertvisi Fortress	Meskheti region	1354		
Mutso	Khevsureti region, right bank of the Andakistskali river	unknown		
Narikala	Tbilisi	300–399		
Agarani Fortress	Near Kojori, Tbilisi		also known as Kojori Fortress, Azeuli Fortress or Kor Ogli Fortress	
Redoubt Kali	10 miles north of Poti	1807		
Surami Fortress	Surami	1170s		
Tmogvi	Left bank of the Kura river	800–899		
