= Shatili =

Shatili შატილი
- Village
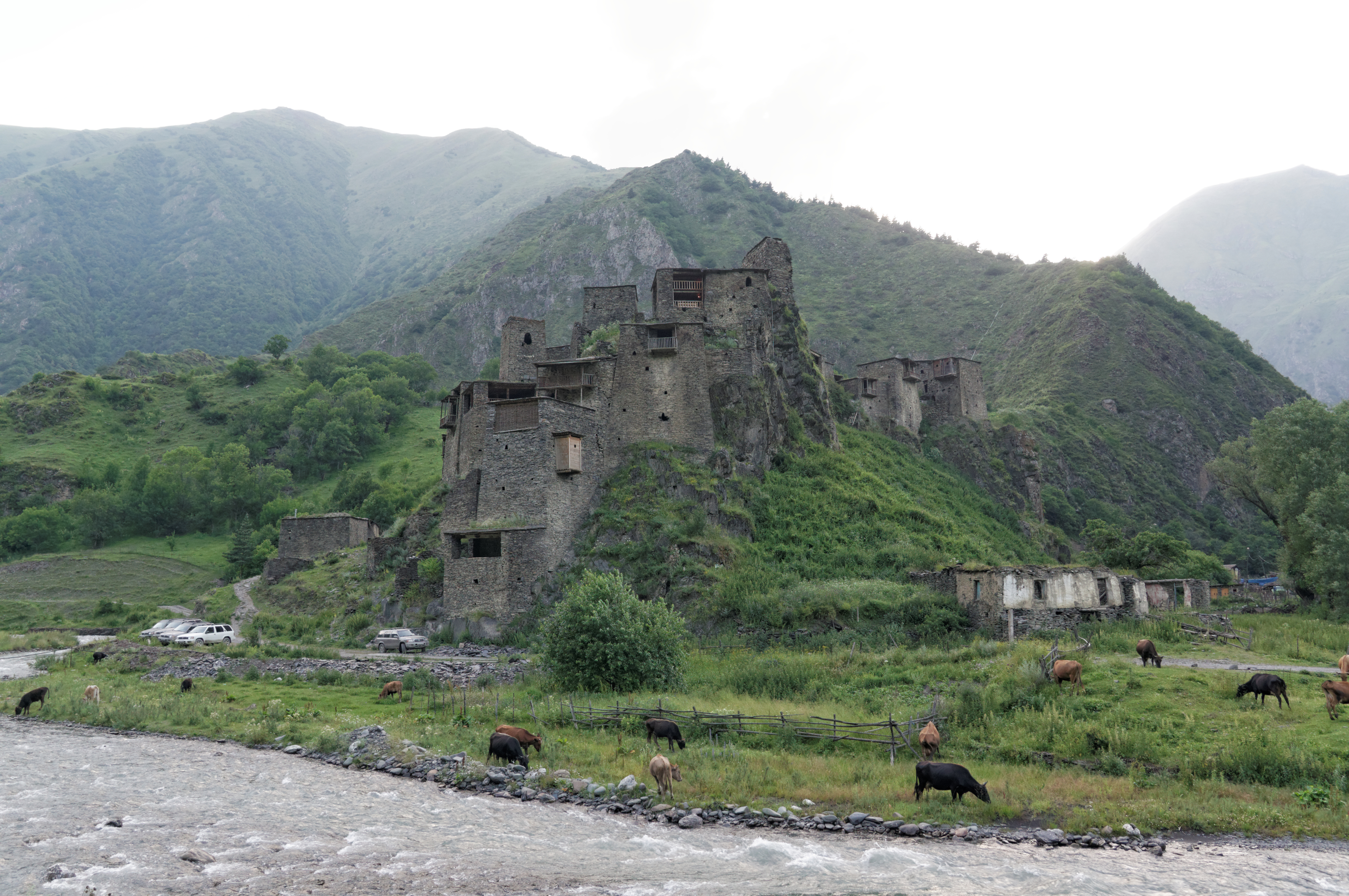
- Shatili village
- Interactive map of Shatili
- Location in Georgia Shatili (Mtskheta-Mtianeti)
- Coordinates: 42°39′32″N 45°09′28″E
- Country: Georgia
- Region: Mtskheta-Mtianeti
- Municipality: Dusheti
- Elevation: 1,400 m (4,600 ft)

Population (2024)
  - Total: 46
- Time zone: UTC+4 (Georgian Time)

Shatili (Georgian: შატილი, Šat’ili IPA: [ʃatʼili]) is a historic highland village in Georgia, near the border with Chechnya. It is located on the northern slope of the Greater Caucasus mountains, in the historical Georgian province of Upper Khevsureti, which is now part of the modern-day region (mkhare) of Mtskheta-Mtianeti.

== Geography ==
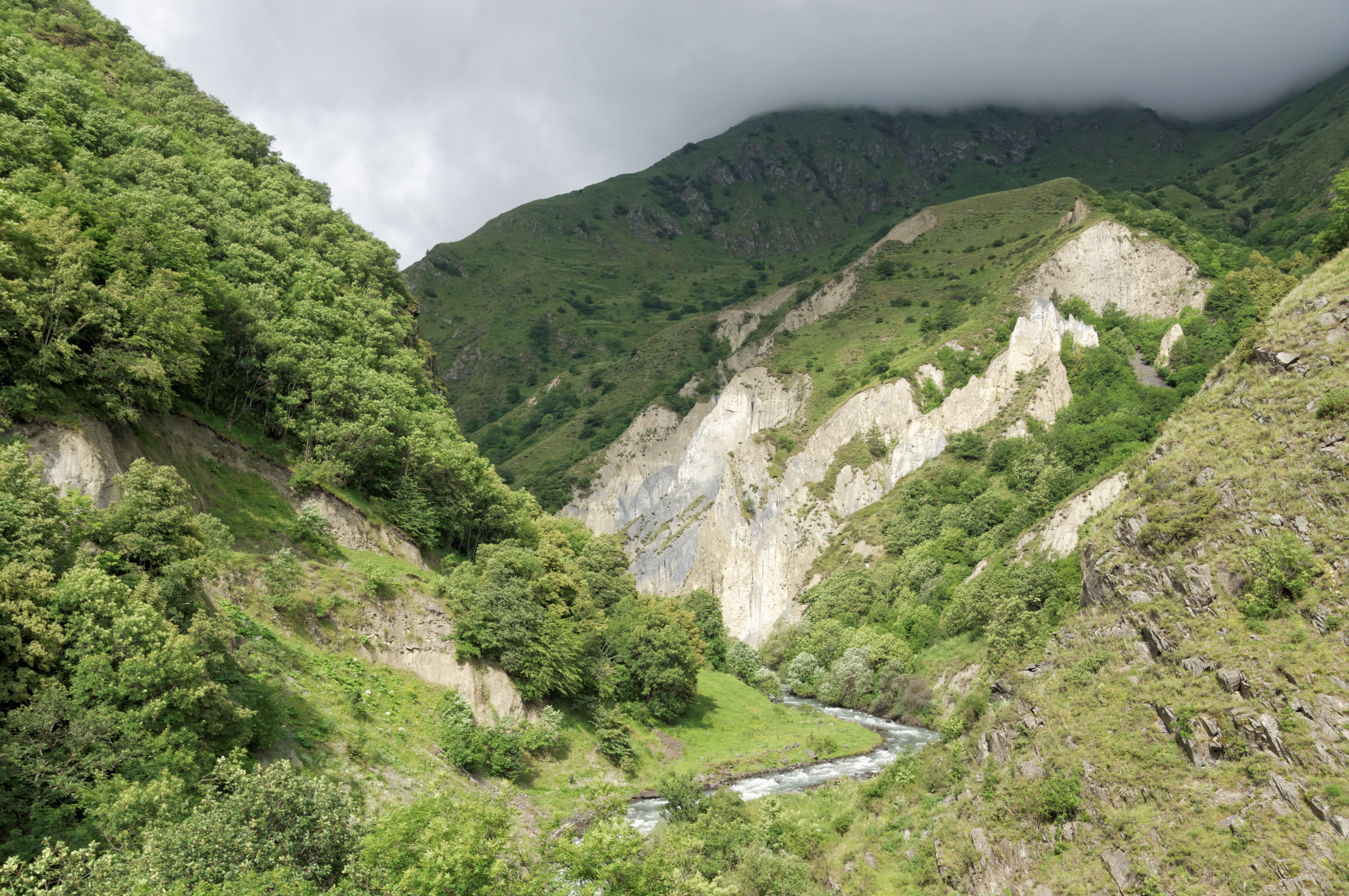
The Shatili valley

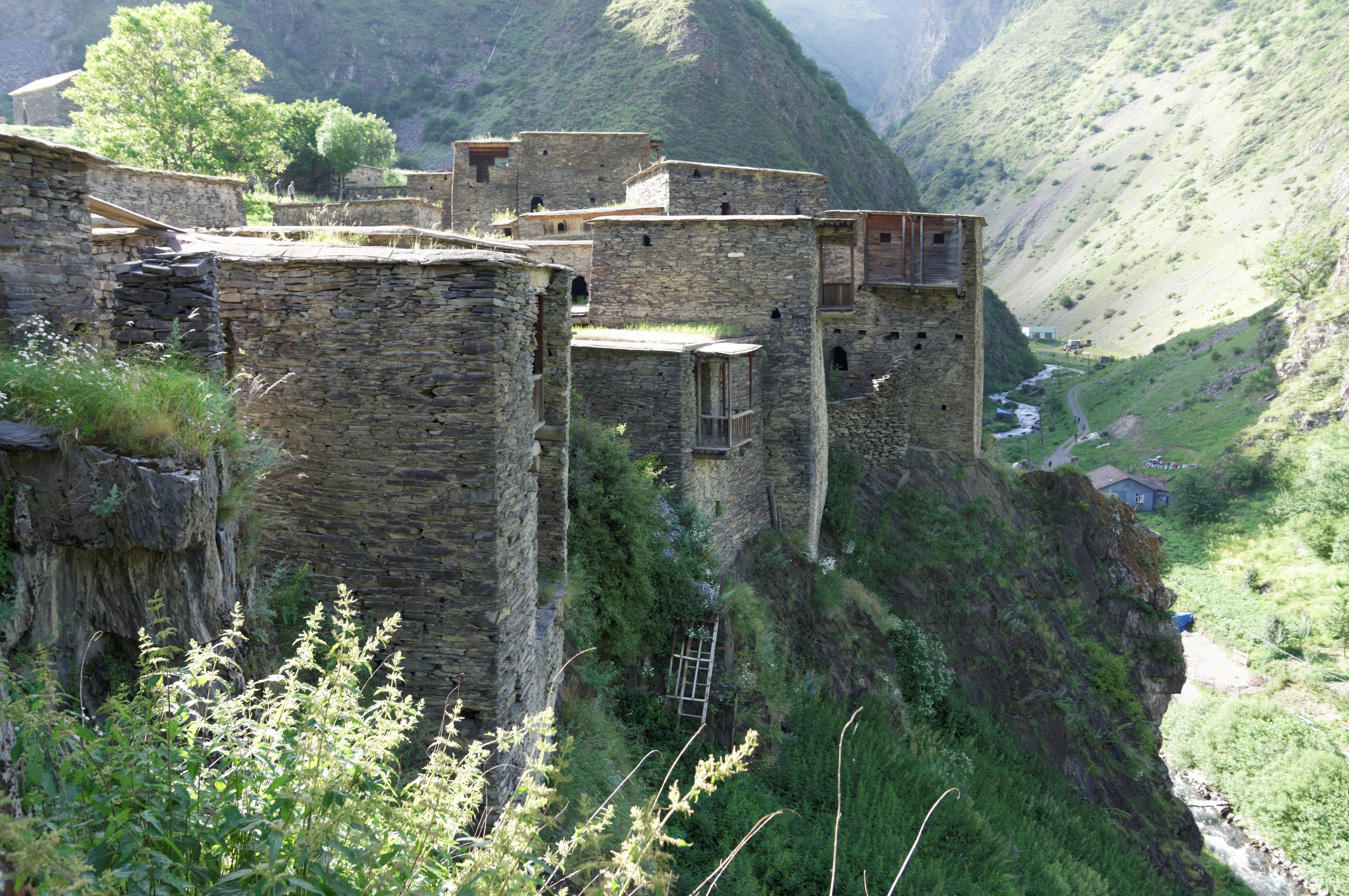
Shatili

Located in the deep Arghuni gorge at approximate 1,400 meters, the village is actually a unique complex of medieval-to-early modern fortresses and fortified dwellings of stone and mortar which functioned both as a residential area and a fortress guarding the northeastern outskirts of the country. The fortress consists of the terraced structures dominated by flat-roofed dwellings and some 60 towers which cluster together to create a single chain of fortifications.

Unique architectural methods and thought are realised in Shatili: selection of location, development of the land with complicated relief, rational land tenure, multifunctionalism, vertical zoning of construction, optimal orientation.

Both single monuments and the overall urban structure with their characteristic components (towers, residential complexes, sowing, chapels) are of special importance.

== History and current status ==
Shatili was once part of the Kingdom of Kakheti.

The population of Shatili and most of the Khevsureti region, were resettled to the plains in the early 1950s, under pressure from the Soviet authorities. In the 1960s, the exotic landscape of the empty village was used as a setting for a series of Georgian films about the past life of the highlanders.

Shatili is still inhabited by a dozen or so families, but is inaccessible by road during the wintertime. The village is a favourite destination for tourists and mountain trekkers.

== Statements of authenticity and/or integrity ==
The authenticity of Shatili is completely preserved in its architectural forms, materials, location and other necessary attributes. The physical condition of the buildings can be characterised as good.

== Comparison with other similar properties ==
At a national level, Shatili might be compared with the Upper Svaneti World Heritage site. Both properties are unique in the region, due to their isolation. The only direct comparisons at a wider extent that might be made would be with isolated communities in the Himalayan massif, but these stem from a completely different cultural tradition.

== See also ==
- Mtskheta-Mtianeti
- Mutso
- Dargavs

== Bibliography ==
=== Russian sources ===
- Иманмухаммад Гигатлинский (2010). Хроника [Chronicle] (in Russian). Translated by Айтберов, Т. М.; Дадаев, Ю. У. Махачкала: Даг. гос. ун-т.
