= Argun (Caucasus) =

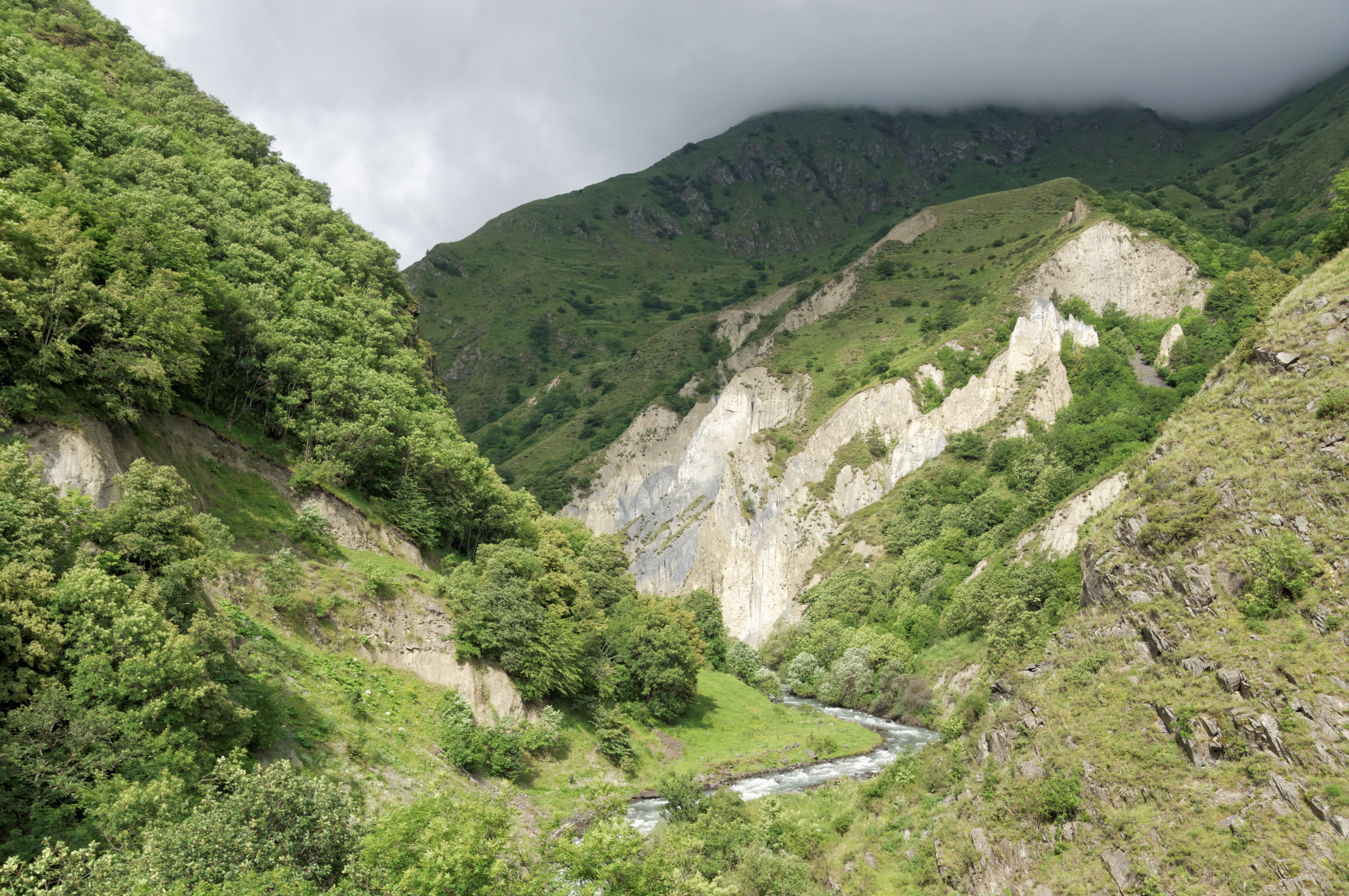
- Shatili valley, Georgia

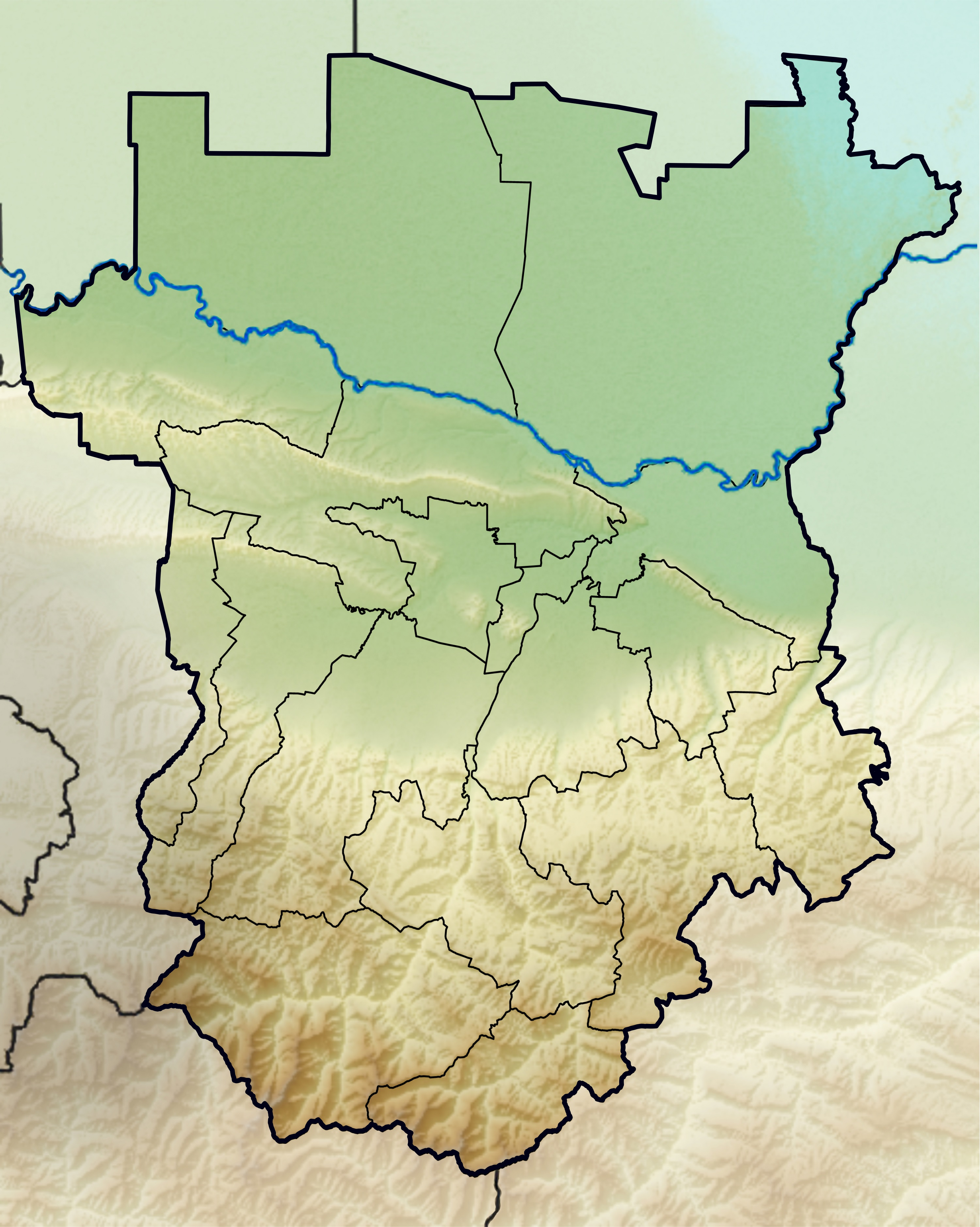
- Location of mouth in Russia Argun (Caucasus) (Georgia) Argun (Caucasus) (Caucasus Mountains)

Location
- Countries: Georgia and Russia
- Region: Mtskheta-Mtianeti
- Federal subject: Chechnya

Physical characteristics
- Source
  - elevation: 2,474 m (8,117 ft)
- Mouth: Sunzha
  - coordinates: 43.3532°N 45.9490°E
  - elevation: 69 m (226 ft)
- Length: 148 km (92 mi)
- Basin size: 3,390 km^{2} (1,310 sq mi)

Basin features
- Progression: Sunzha→ Terek→ Caspian Sea

The Argun (Russian: Аргу́н, Chechen: Орга, Orga, Georgian: არღუნი, arghuni), also known as Chantiy-Argun, cognate with one of the biggest Chechen teips Chantiy, is a river in the Caucasus. It flows through the northern Caucasus, Georgia, and the Chechen Republic of Russia. It is an affluent of the Sunzha and lies within the river basin of the Terek. It is 148 kilometres (92 mi) long, and has a drainage basin of 3,390 square kilometres (1,310 sq mi). The river has its sources on the northern slopes of the Caucasus in Khevsureti, Georgia. The Argun flows in western Chechnya through the Itum-Kalinsky and Shatoysky districts.

This area was the first place where the Chechens established themselves. Many ruins of former villages built in the traditional style can still be seen. The Argun serves as a natural border between the Shalinsky and the Groznensky Districts. The occupation of its valley by the Russians in 1858 was an important event in the last phase of the Russian conquest of Chechnya and Dagestan. Before the First and Second Chechen Wars the region around the river was populated by numerous farms and houses. The town of Argun is named after the river.

On September 7, 2008, the only bridge crossing the Argun River, connecting northern and southern territories of Chechnya, collapsed. Drivers caught on the bridge escaped without injury. A federal road administration representative linked the accident to abnormal stress from heavy military vehicles.

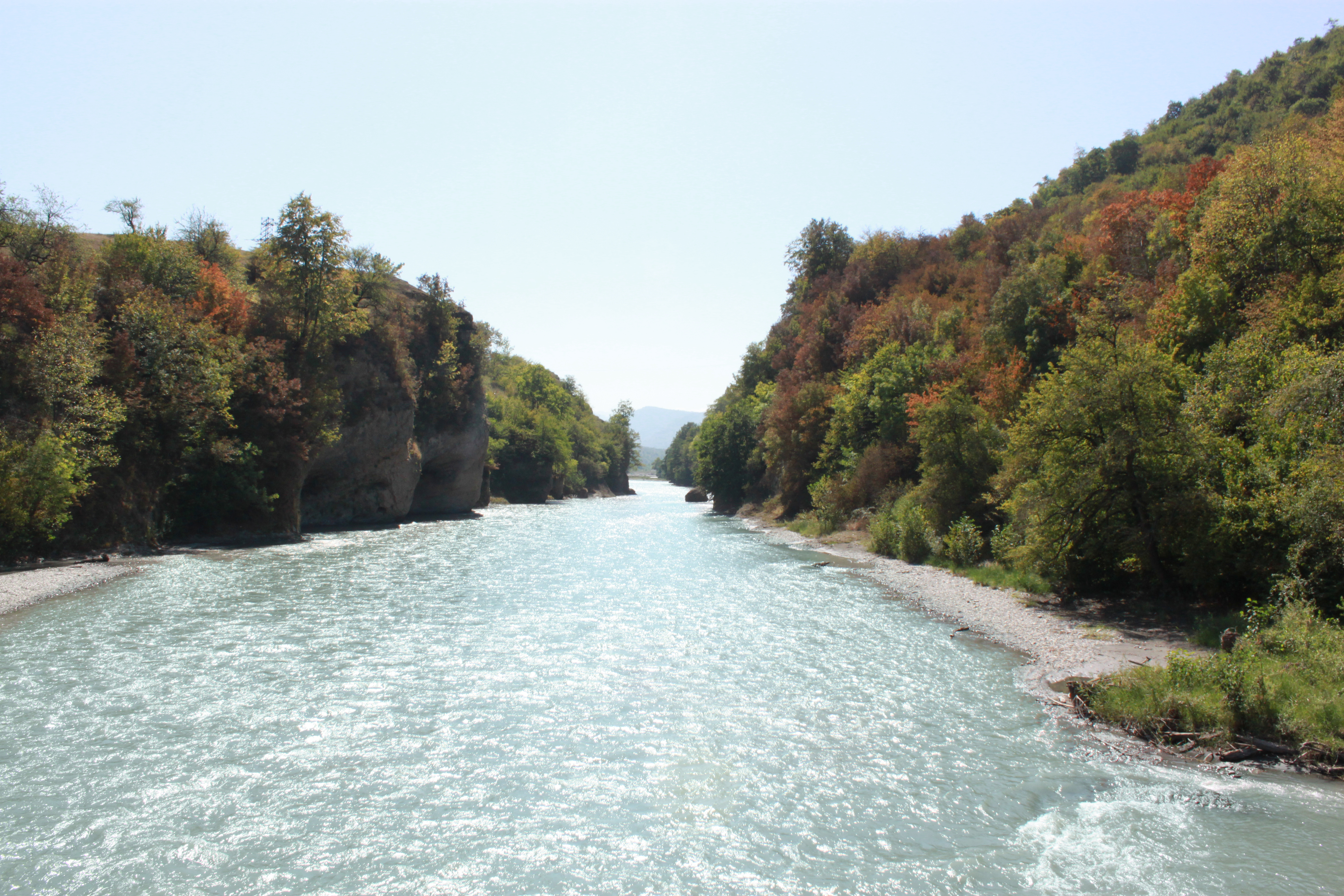
Argun River in Duba-Yurt, Chechnya

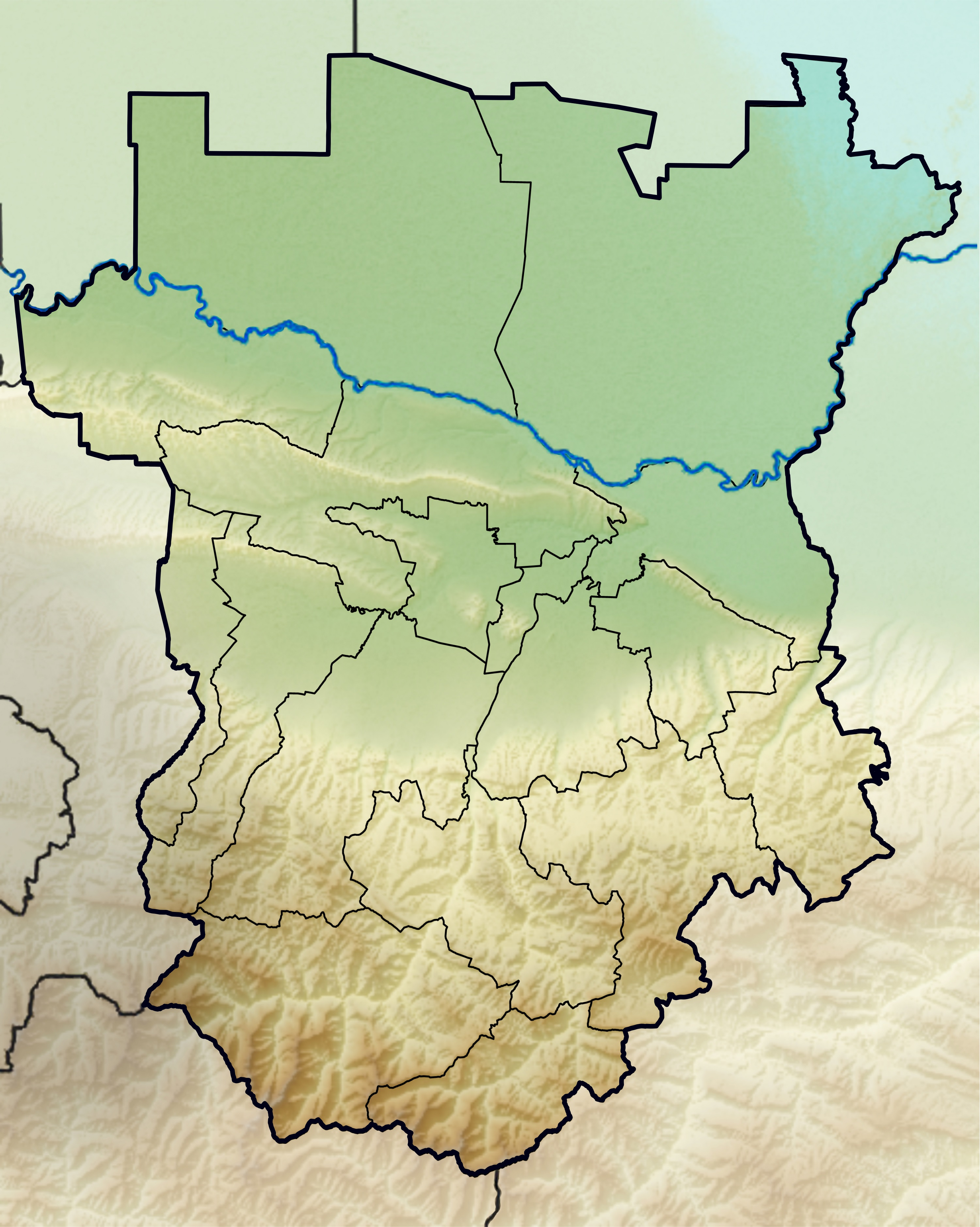
Blue dots are on the Argun River.

== Description ==
The Argun River has a length of 148 km and a basin area of 3390 km^{2}. The average slope of the river is 17.63 m/km and its average water consumption is 45.6 m^{3}/s. The food source of the Argun River is mixed, and there is no solid freeze-up.

The Argun River originates from glaciers on the northern slopes of the Greater Caucasus Range. In its upper reaches, before it merges with the Sharoargun River, it is known as Chanty-Argun. The river then flows through the Argun Gorge in mountainous Chechnya, which is mostly treeless near the source and covered with almost continuous forests further downstream. The mountainous part of the Argun basin and its tributaries form the western part of mountainous Chechnya, the Itum-Kalinsky and Shatoisky districts. This area is one of the original settlements of the Chechen people and is characterized by numerous ancient ruins of auls with traditional tower structures.

Upon reaching the plain, the Argun becomes the border between the Grozny and Shali regions of Chechnya until it flows into the Sunzha River. The valley is densely populated, and before the war, it was characterized by the almost continuous development of private estate-type houses. The city of Argun is located in the lower reaches of the river.

== Gallery ==
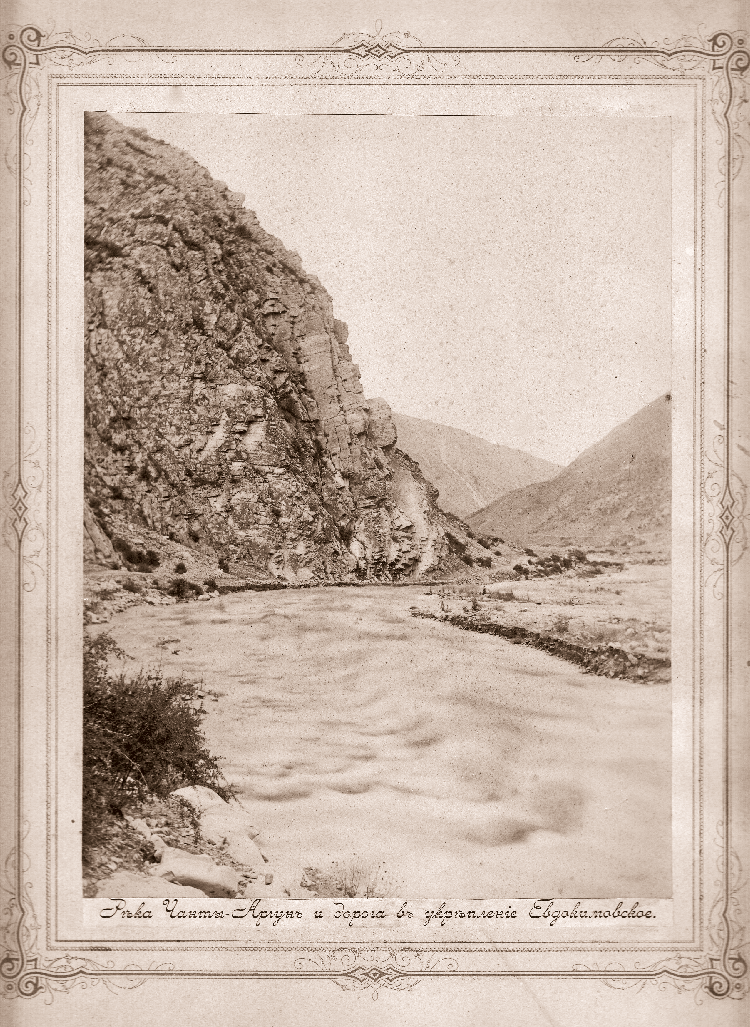
Chanty-Argun river. 1850-1896

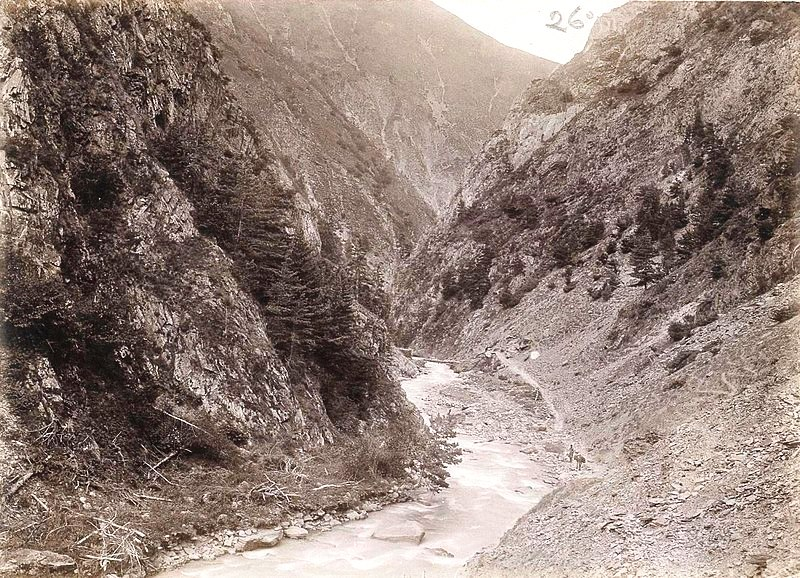
The Argun River (above Shatili), photo by Desha Moritz. 1897

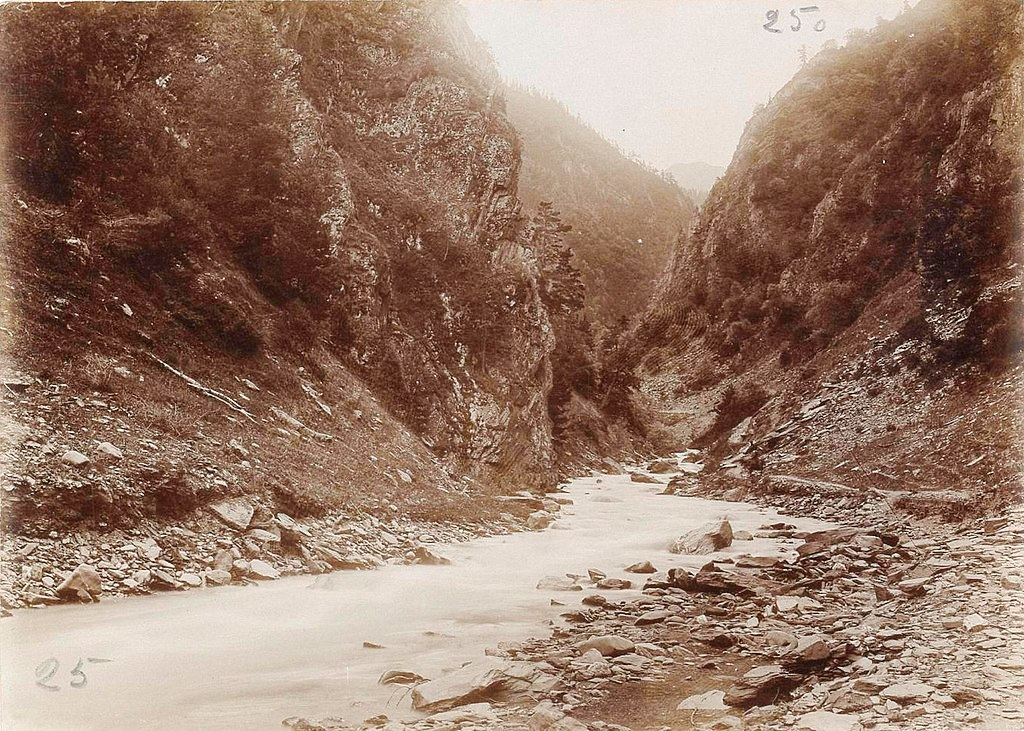
The Argun River, photo of the expedition of Count Desha Moritz. 1897

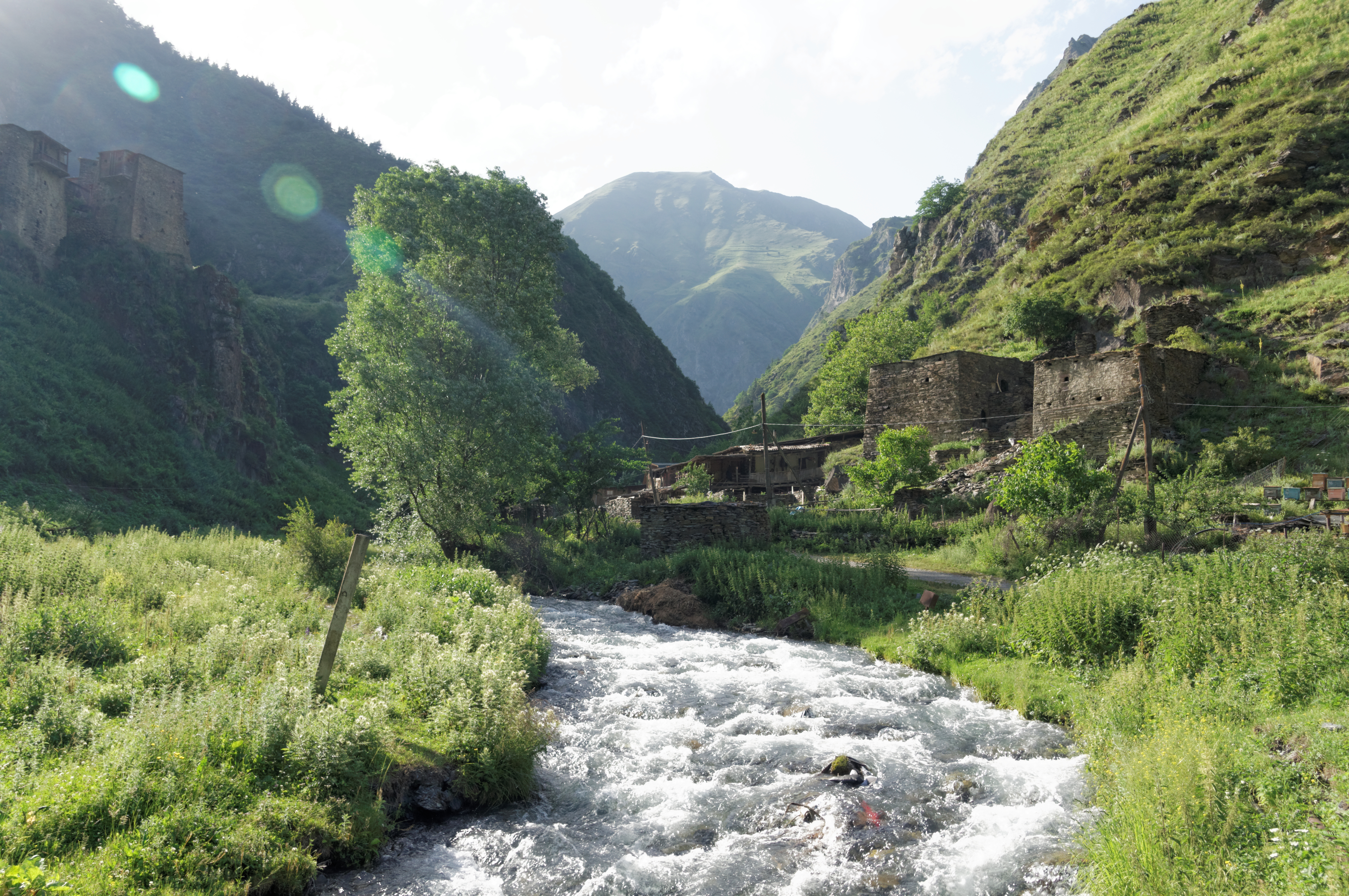
Shatili Valley

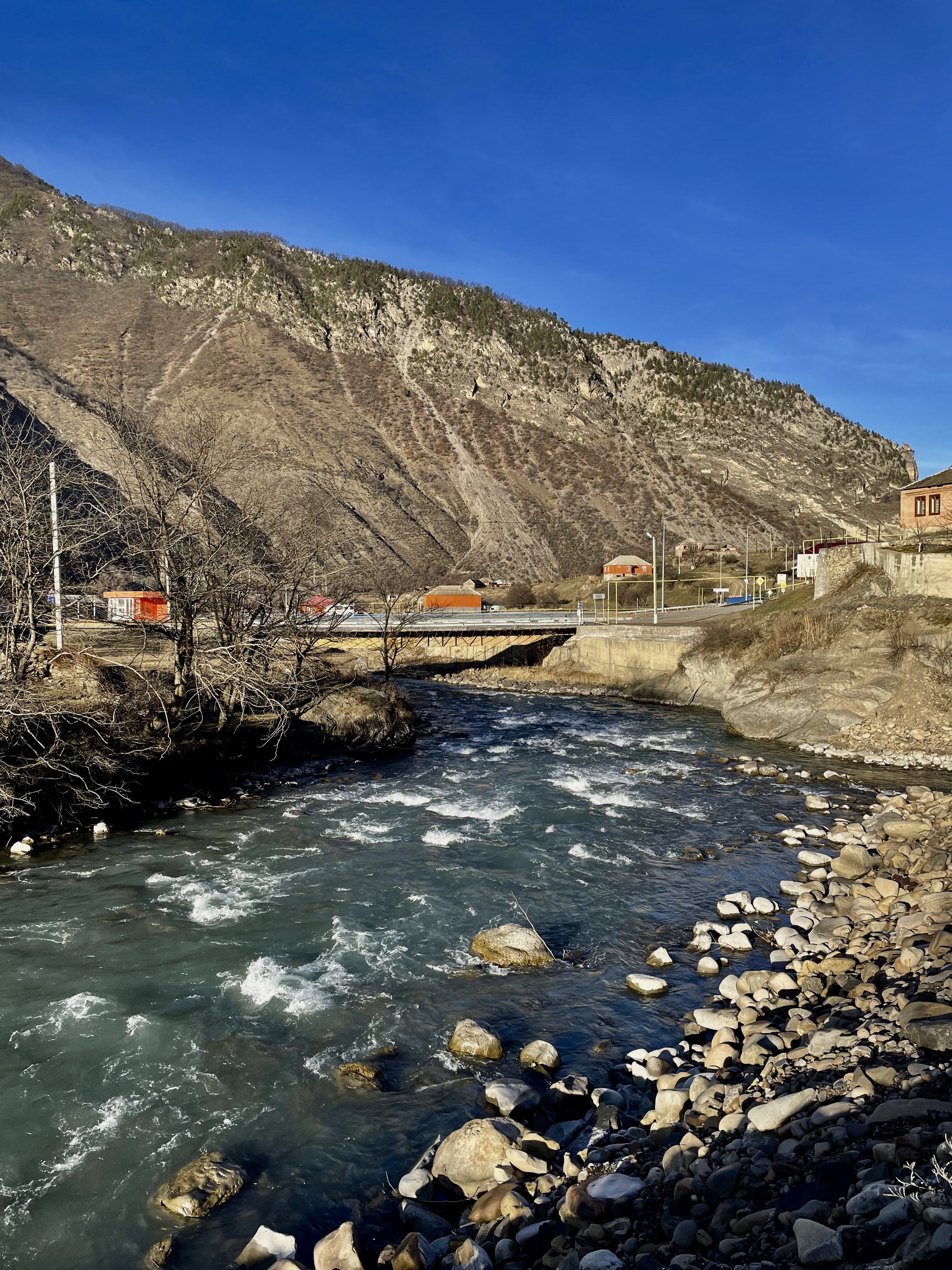
Argun near the village of Ushkaloy 2021

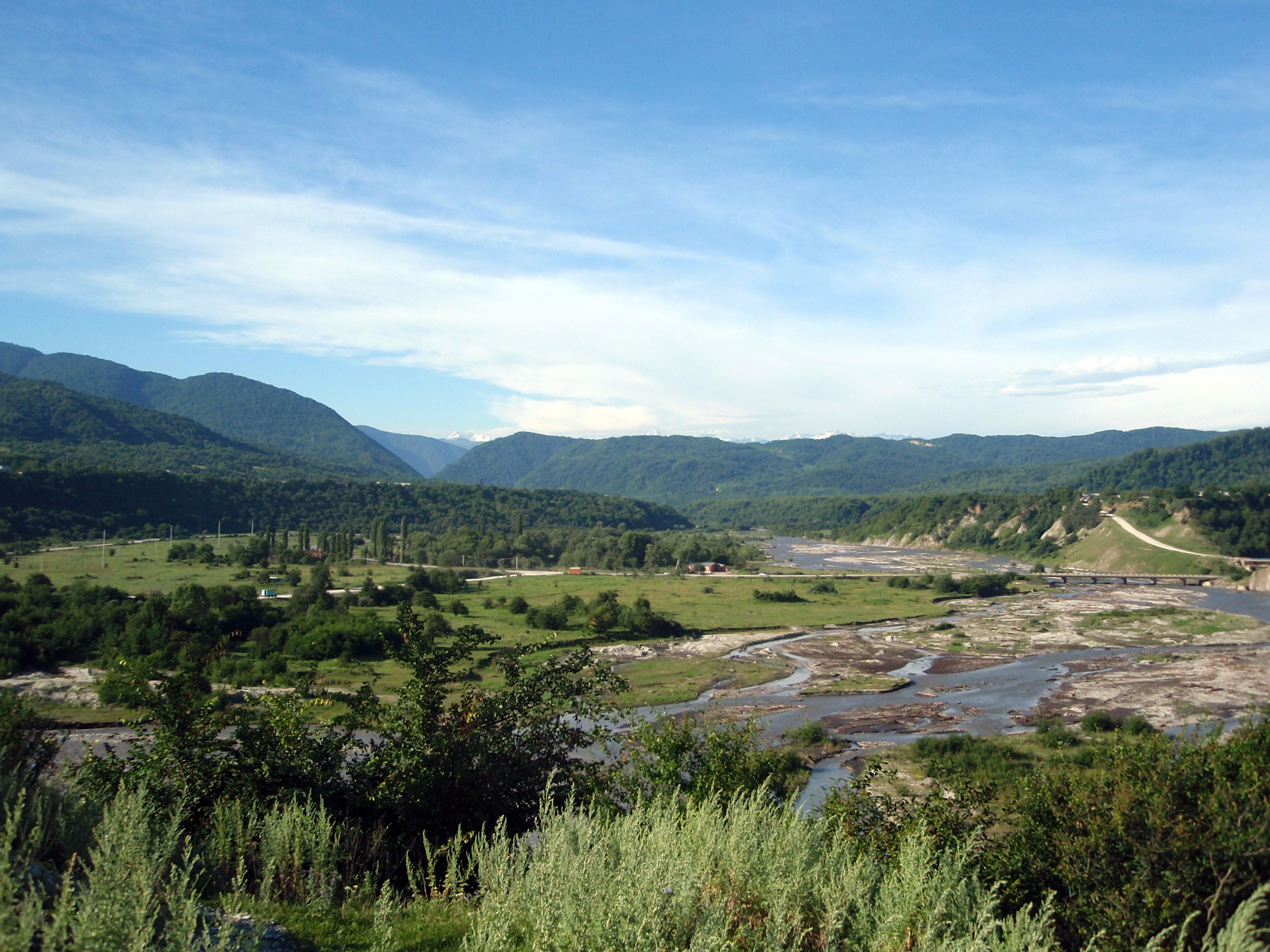
View of the Argun River (Shali district) in relative proximity to the village of Chiri-Yurt

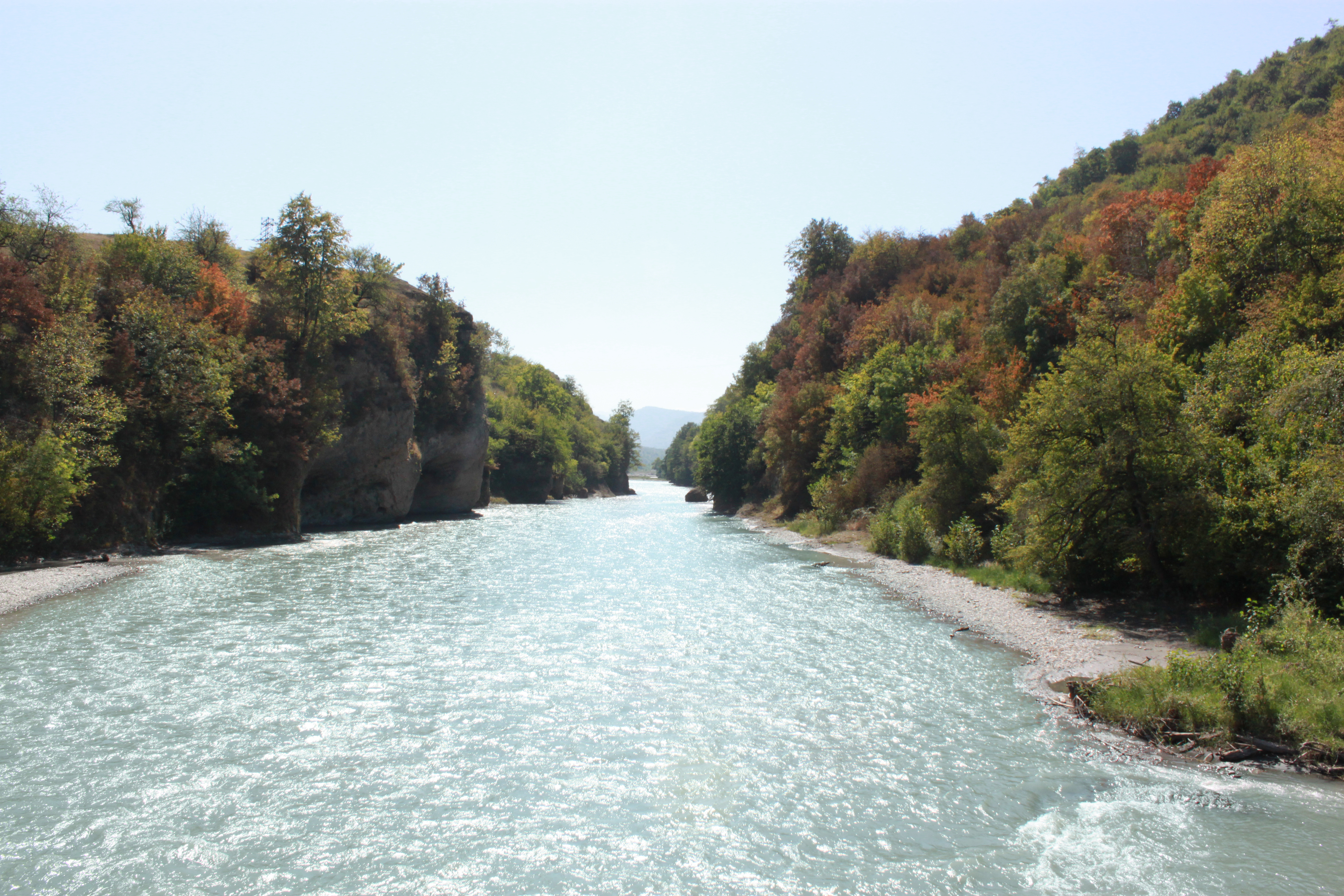
Argun river in Duba-Yurt, Chechnya

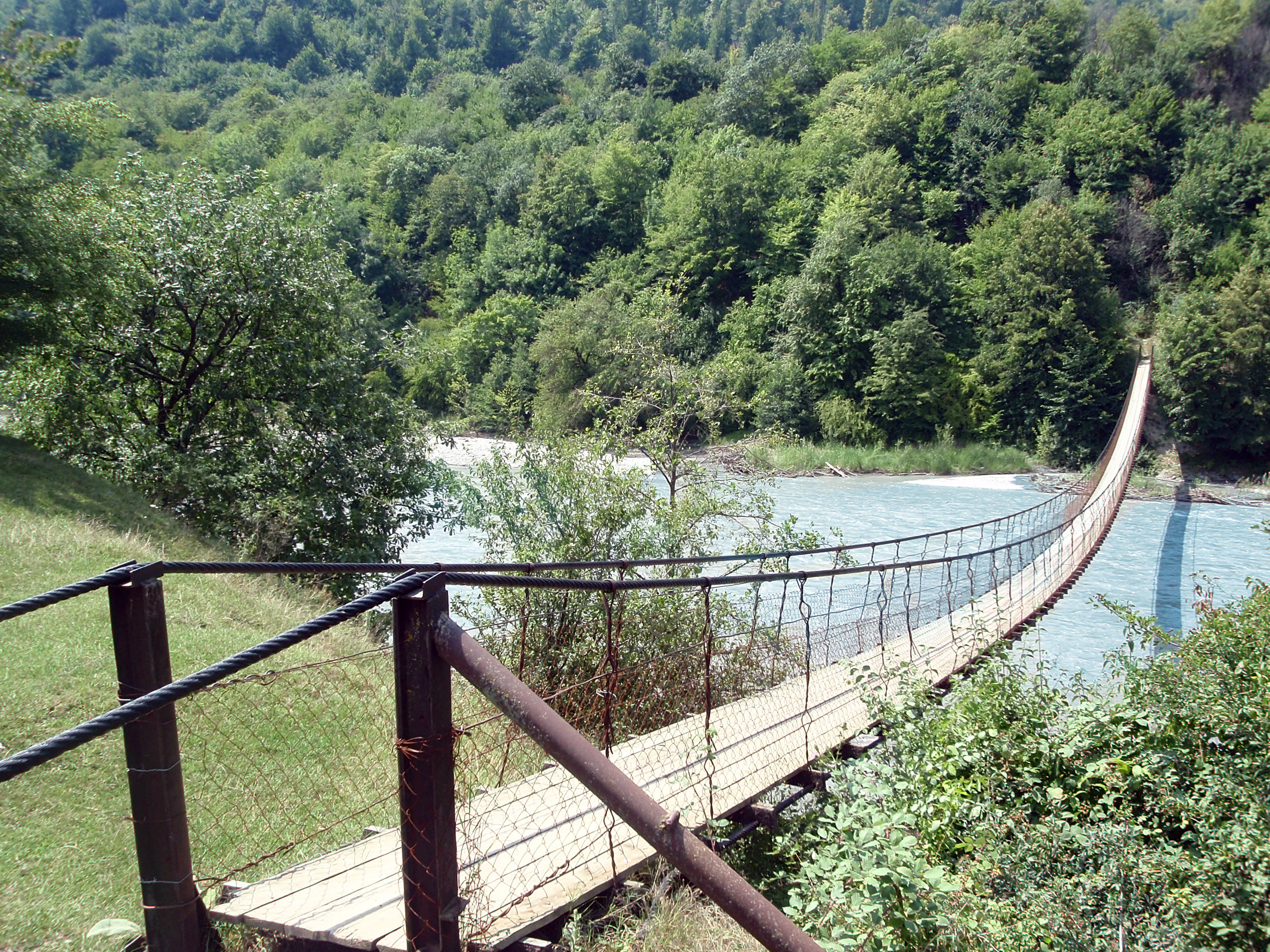
Suspension bridge near Duba-Yurt

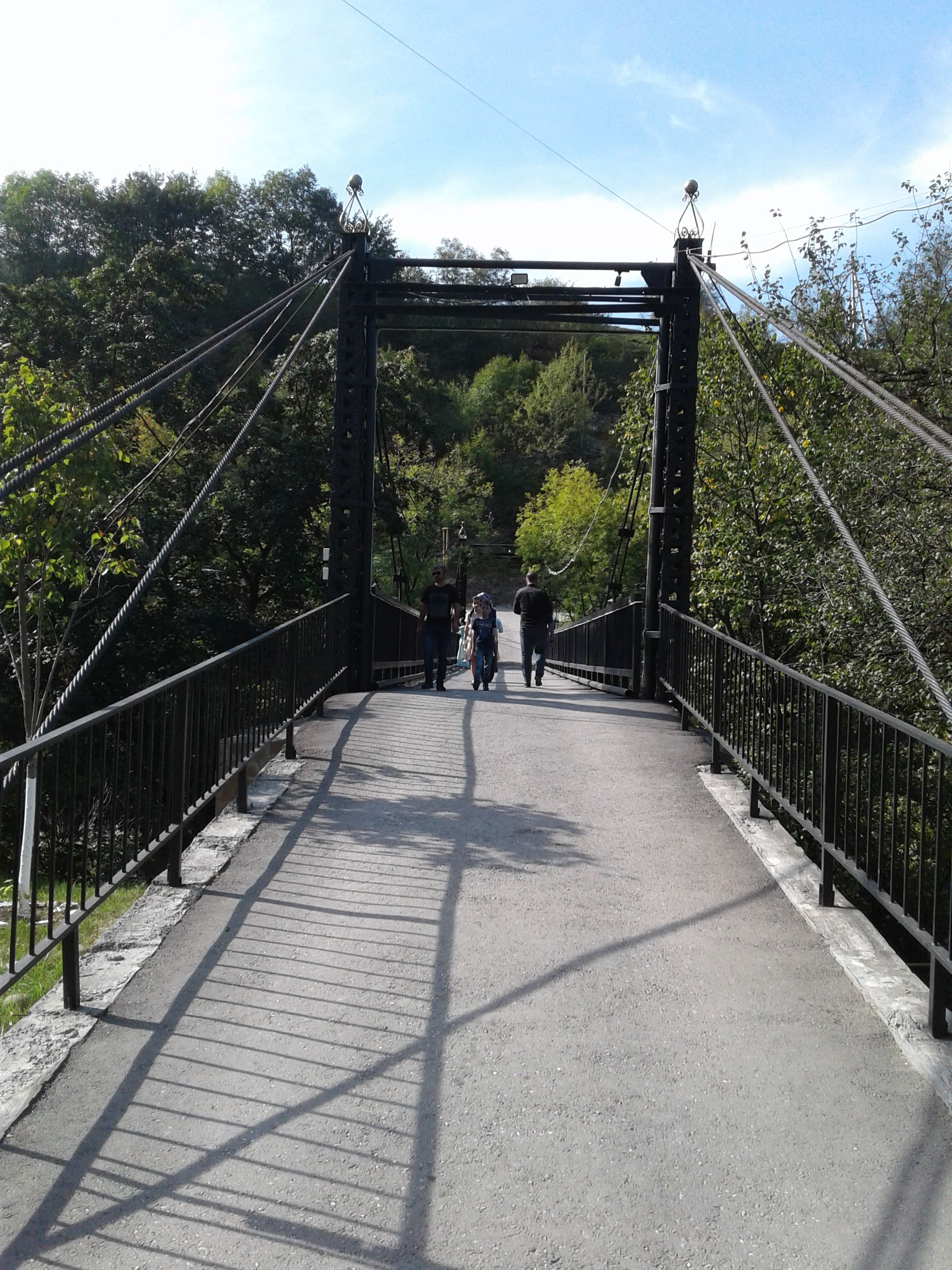
Bridge across Argun to Nikhaloevsky waterfalls
