= Mutso =

Village in Mtskheta-Mtianeti, Georgia

Mutso მუცო
- Village
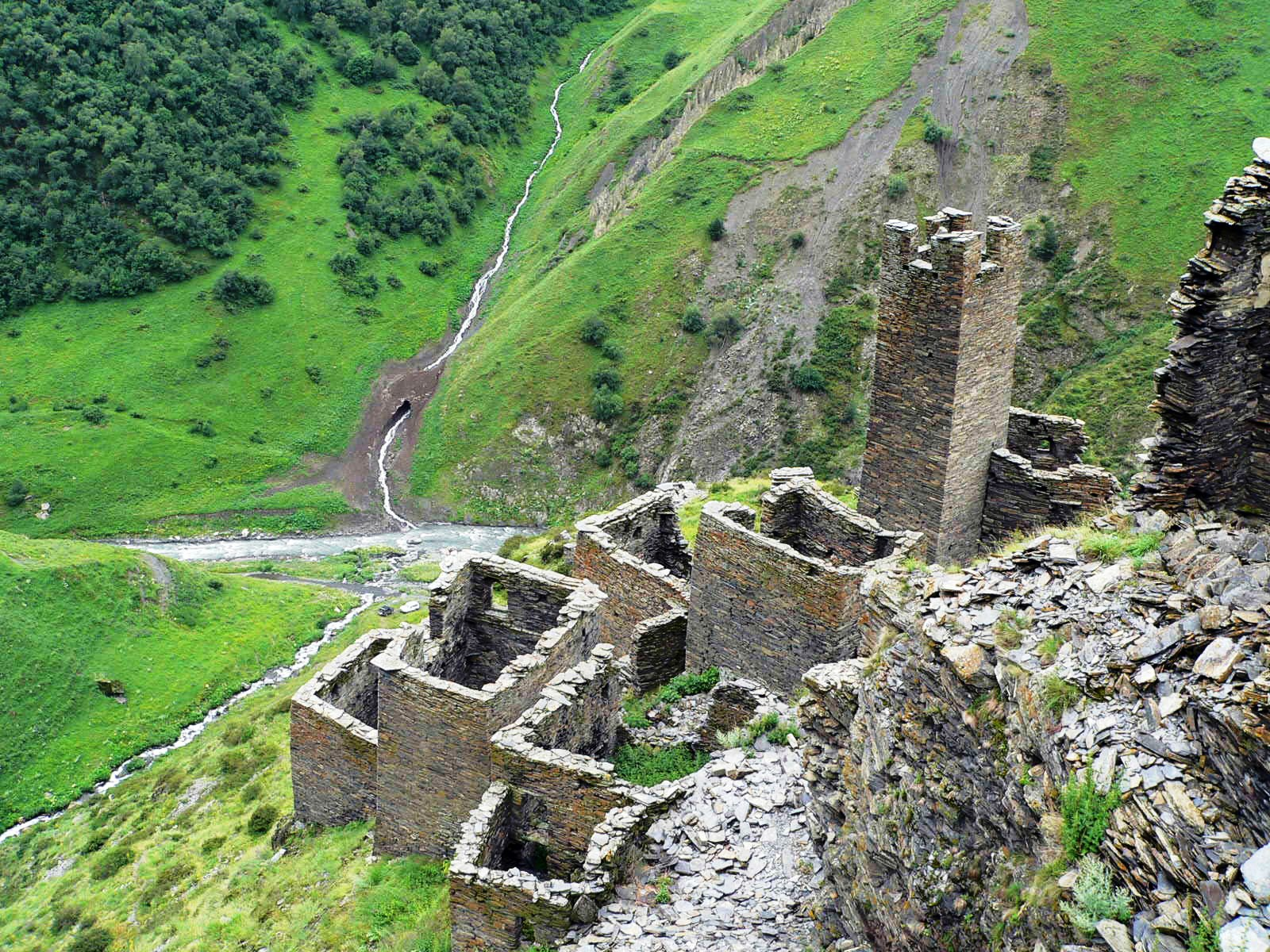
- View of Mutso

- Location in Mtskheta-Mtianeti Location in Georgia
- Coordinates: 42.606111°N 45.206111°E
- Country: Georgia
- Region: Mtskheta-Mtianeti
- Municipality: Dusheti Municipality
- Administrative unit: Shatili

Population (2024)
  - Total: 5
- Time zone: UTC+4 (Georgia Time)

Mutso (Georgian: მუცო) is a highland village in Dusheti Municipality, Mtskheta-Mtianeti, northern Georgia, in the historical region of Pirikita Khevsureti. A municipal ordinance lists it among the villages of the Shatili administrative unit. The separately protected medieval fortified settlement of Mutso occupies the rocky slope above the modern village.

== Name ==
The form მუცო is used for the village in Georgian municipal legislation. In a 2008 archaeological study, Ivane Tsiklauri headed the section on the site მიცუ (იგივე მუცო), meaning “Mitsu (the same as Mutso)”, documenting მიცუ as an alternative Georgian form.

== Geography and population ==
Mutso lies in the Ardoti River valley, on a tributary of the Argun, approximately 11 to 12 km (6.8 to 7.5 mi) from Shatili.

== History of the village ==
Nineteenth- and early twentieth-century accounts distinguished the fortified complex on the upper slope from a smaller settlement of the same name at its foot. The lower settlement lay south of the fortified complex and, in the late 19th century, formed part of the Ardoti community in the Tionety uezd of the Tiflis Governorate.

The Geographical and Statistical Dictionary of the Russian Empire recorded 98 inhabitants in 17 households in 1867. Radde's account gave 20 hearths or households for 1873.

== Fortified settlement ==
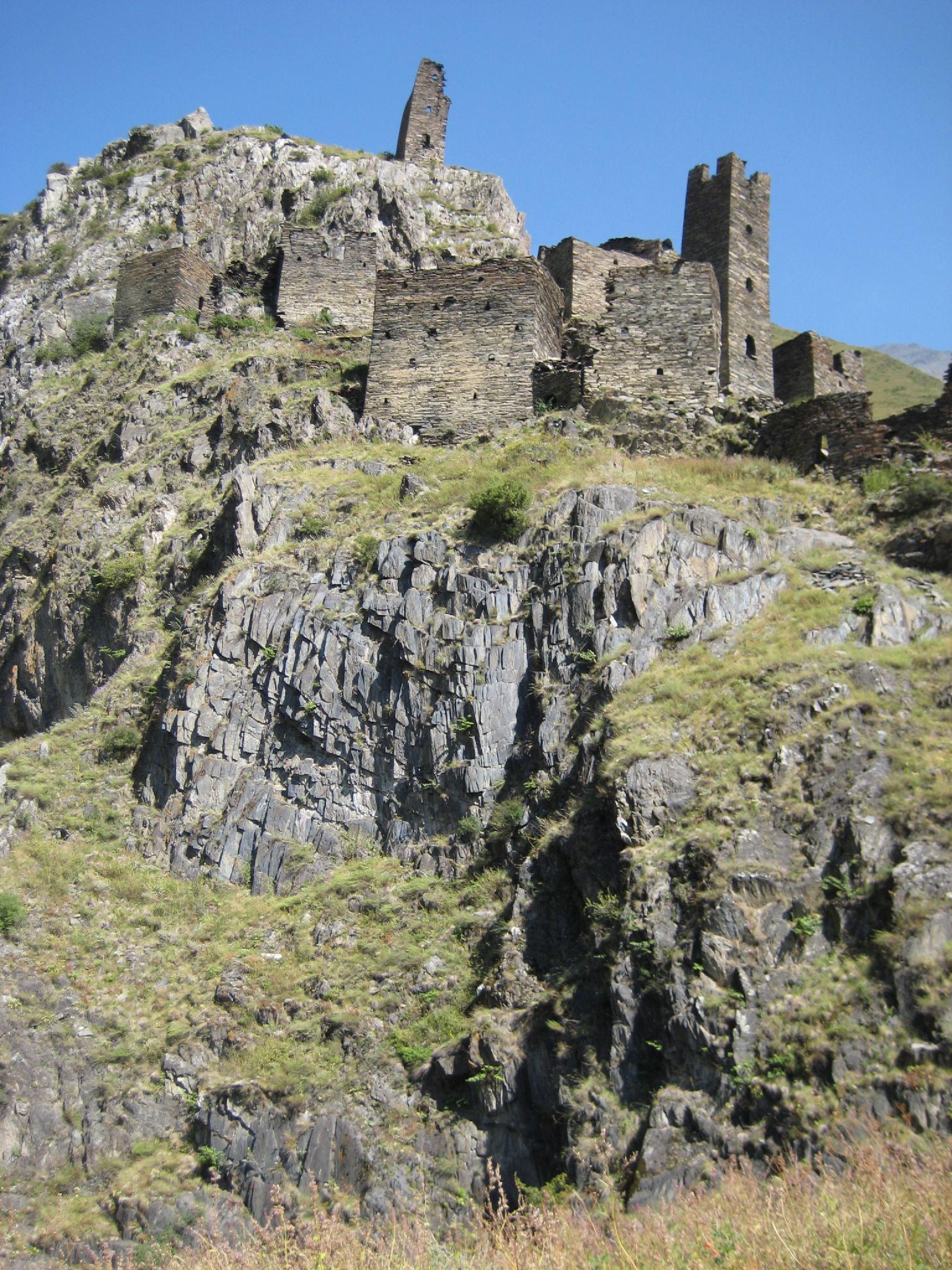
The fortified settlement above the village

Above the modern village, a medieval fortified complex occupies three rocky terraces and contains fortified dwellings, defensive towers and walls, religious structures and above-ground burial vaults. Presidential Decree No. 665 of 7 November 2006 lists the complex as მუცო - ციხე-სოფელი, dates it broadly to the Middle Ages and grants it the status of an immovable cultural monument of national significance.

A rehabilitation programme begun in 2014 received a European Heritage Award / Europa Nostra Award in 2019 and subsequently won the programme's Public Choice Award.

== See also ==
- Shatili
- Anatori
