= S10 highway (Georgia) =

Trunk road in Georgia

S10
- საერთაშორისო 10
- Gori-Tskhinvali-Gupta-Java-Roki

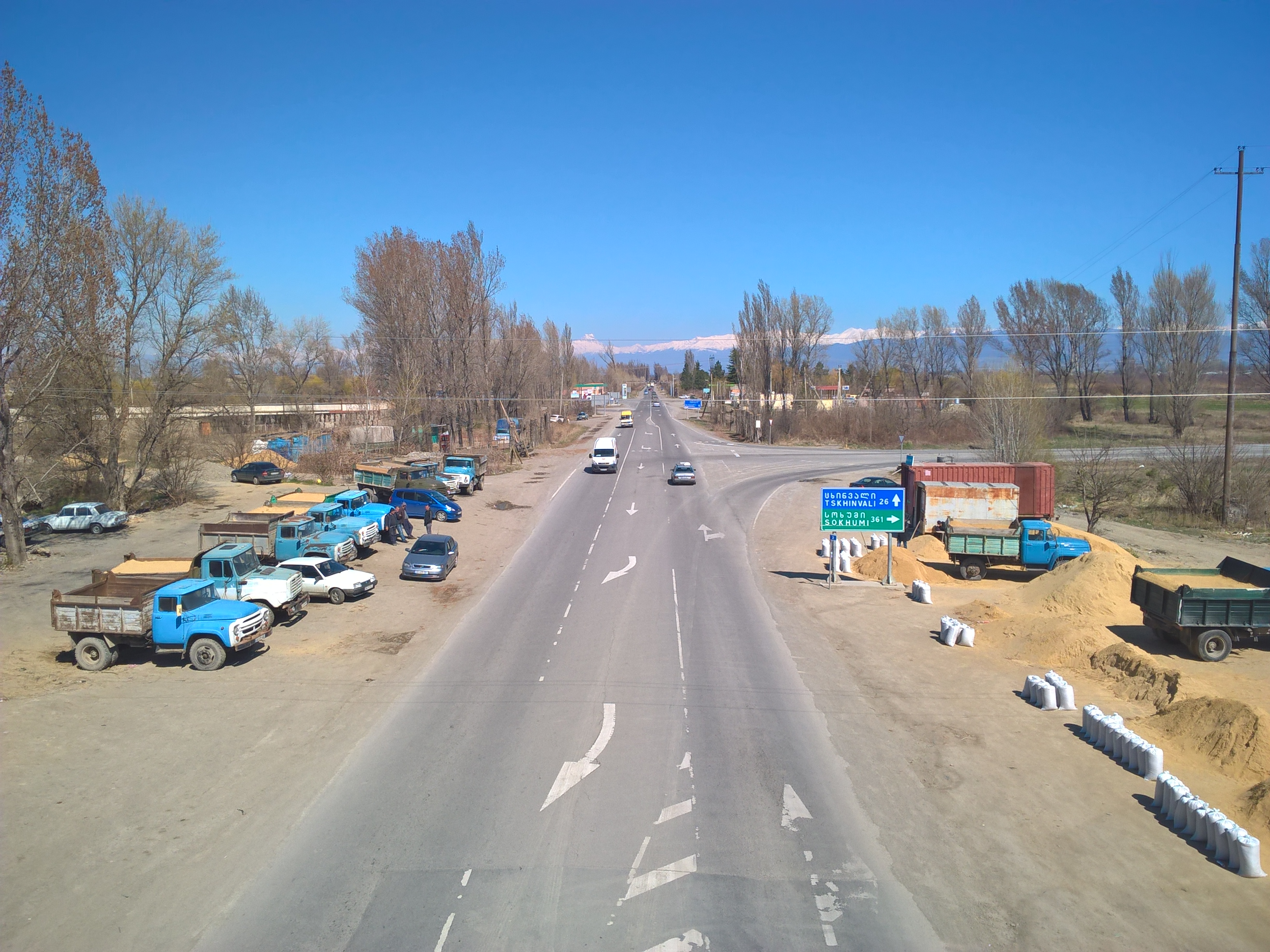
- S10 from Gori to Tskhinvali

Route information
- Length: 92.5 km (57.5 mi)
- Existed: 1996–present

Major junctions
- South end: Gori
- (km) 4 Sokhumi / Tbilisi 30 Roadblock South Ossetia ABL 49 Sh25 Kvaisa
- North end: Russian border (Roki) (Russia)

Location
- Georgia
- Municipalities: Gori, Java
- Major cities: Gori, Tskhinvali

Highway system
- Roads in Georgia; International Routes; National Routes

The Georgian S10 route (Georgian: საერთაშორისო მნიშვნელობის გზა ს10, Saertashoriso mnishvnelobis gza S10, road of international importance), also known as "Gori-Tskhinvali-Gupta-Java-Roki (Russian border)", is a "road of international importance" within the Georgian road network from Gori via Tskhinvali to the Russian border at the Roki Tunnel with a length of 92.5 kilometres (57.5 mi). After crossing the Russian border the road continues as A164 highway to Alagir and the R217 "Caucasus Highway". The S10 route, which intersects with the S1 highway just outside of the city of Gori, is often referred to as Transkam or Transcaucasian Highway. It is not part of European or Asian international highway routes.

The road reaches its highest point of 2,112 m (6,929 ft) above sea level at the southern portal of the Roki Tunnel, which opened in 1984. The tunnel is shared with Russia and was the longest within the Soviet Union upon its commissioning with a length of 3,730 m (2.32 mi). It is still the longest tunnel (partially) in Georgia. Yet, this feature has limited value in Georgia as the highway is not controlled by the Georgian government beyond Ergneti village near Tskhinvali where the Administrative Boundary Line of breakaway South Ossetia runs. Crossing into South Ossetia from Georgian controlled territory (and vice versa) is not possible.

== Background ==
The current S10 route was divided over different routes within the Soviet road network classification introduced in 1982. The Gori-Tskhinvali-Java segment became part of the R-2 route that continued via Kvaisa until Oni, while the Java-Roki segment of today's S10 was designated R-24 when the Roki Tunnel opened in 1984. On the Russian SFSR side of the Roki Tunnel the Transkam Highway, which was finished in 1986, continued as R-297 to Alagir. Prior to the 1980s the route of today's S10 was unnumbered as was the case with most Soviet roads.

After Georgia regained independence in 1991, the Soviet route designations were maintained until 1996 when the current system was adopted. In that year the "roads of international importance" (S-)category was introduced and the "S10 Gori-Tskhinvali-Gupta-Java-Roki (Russian border)" replaced the old designations.

=== Roki Tunnel ===
Before the tunnel through the Roki Pass opened in November 1984, there was no direct road from the South Ossetian Autonomous Oblast to the North Ossetian Autonomous SSR in the Russian SFSR. At the most there was a dirt track after an abandoned attempt in the 19th century to build a road. Instead, the Ossetian Military Road via the Mamison Pass was constructed in the 19th century which was until 1984 the shortest option to reach South Ossetia by road from the north, besides the Georgian Military Road via Kazbegi. This lack of direct connections between the Ossetian communities on either side of the mountains triggered the Ossetian autonomous authorities to campaign for a railroad and later a road through the mountains. After a last attempt in the late 1940s for a railroad connection through the Dzomag (Magsky) Pass, 3 km (1.9 mi) west of Roki, and various geological and design studies into a road connection the Council of Ministers of the Soviet Union decreed in 1971 a road connection through Roki. Upgrading the existing Mamison route with a tunnel was part of earlier surveys, but despite being geologically more advantageous this was dismissed in favour of the Roki variant which needed a shorter tunnel. Georgian Soviet authorities had long attempted to prevent a direct rail or road connection between the South Ossetian oblast and the North Ossetian republic fearing nationalist unity but eventually had to succumb to Moscow. The scope was to build a road that would be open year-round. Both the Ossetian and Georgian Military Roads are sensitive to snowdrift leading to seasonal closures. The Roki tunnel opened in 1984, while the Transkam Highway was fully finished in 1986.

== Route ==
The S10 highway begins in the city of Gori at an elevation of 600 m (2,000 ft) asl and goes to the Russian border in the Caucasus Mountains, more than 2,100 m (6,900 ft) above sea level. Two third of the route is located in breakaway South Ossetia and is not under central Georgian control. Until the boundary line of South Ossetia the landscape is flat with a slight slope towards the north. At the boundary line the road has reached 850 m (2,790 ft) asl. After South Ossetia capital Tskhinvali the route enters the mountains and follows the Liakhvi river or its upper tributaries into the highest regions of the road. The route enters Russia via the Roki Tunnel.

=== Gori - Ergneti ===
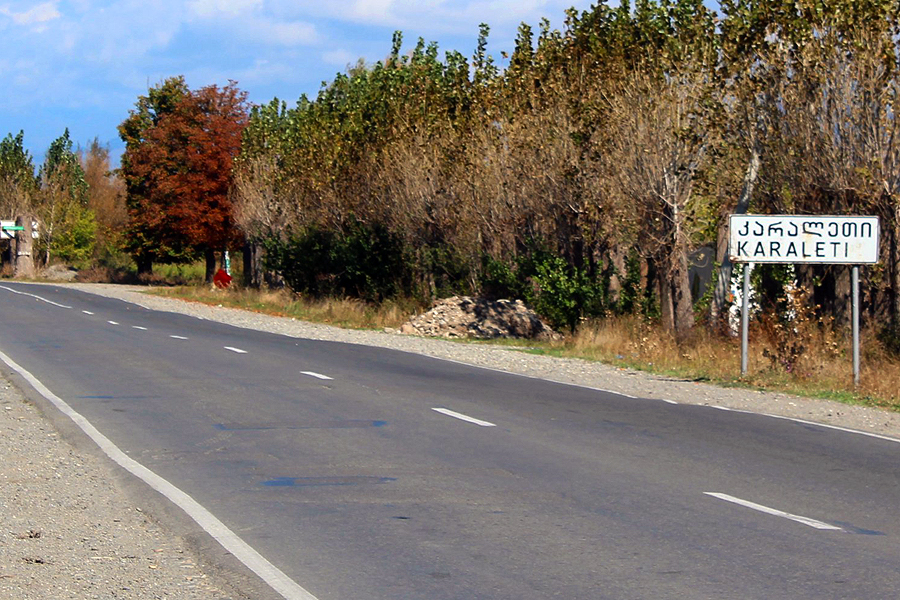
S10 through Karaleti village

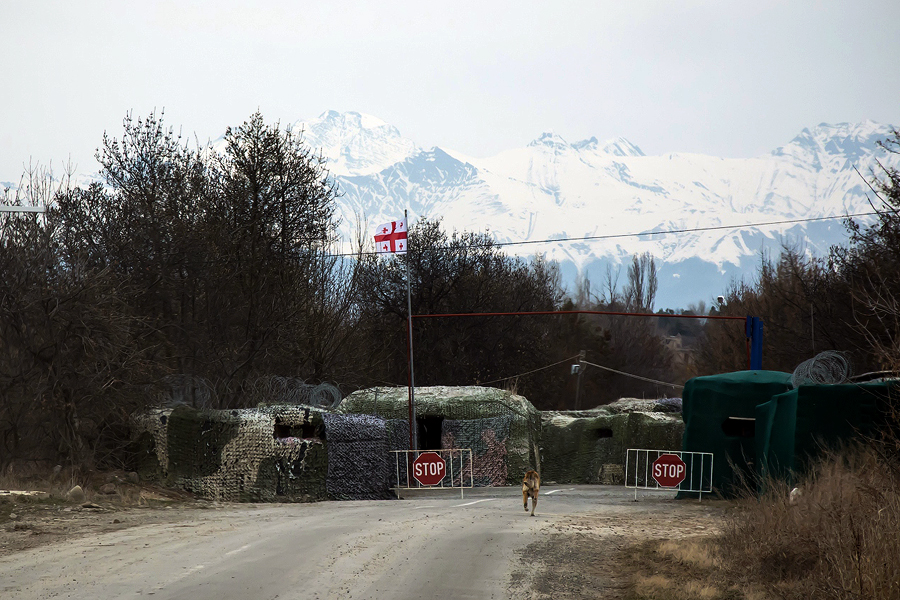
De facto terminus S10 at Ergneti

Starting in the centre of Gori the S10 runs north from the Gori Fortress out of town towards the S1 highway. This highway provides a motorway connection to Tbilisi and the western parts of Georgia. Passing underneath the motorway the S10 runs in a straight line through the flat agricultural land towards Karaleti village parallel to the Liakhvi river at a distance of a few kilometers. Even though the road is closed for through traffic into Tskhinvali and South Ossetia, it has importance in the area just south of it with many Georgian communities near the boundary line. The highway connects them with the rest of Georgia. Just north from Ergneti village a roadblock at the boundary line prevents further travel. Since the 2008 war the site is used for conflict resolution meetings and exchange of detainees involving international actors.

=== Tskhinvali - Roki ===
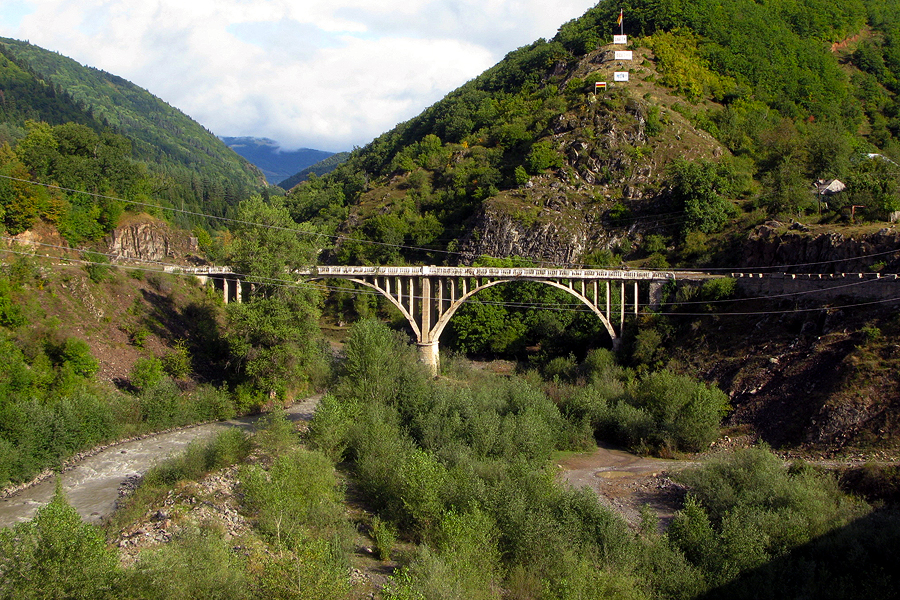
1929 Guftinsky Bridge

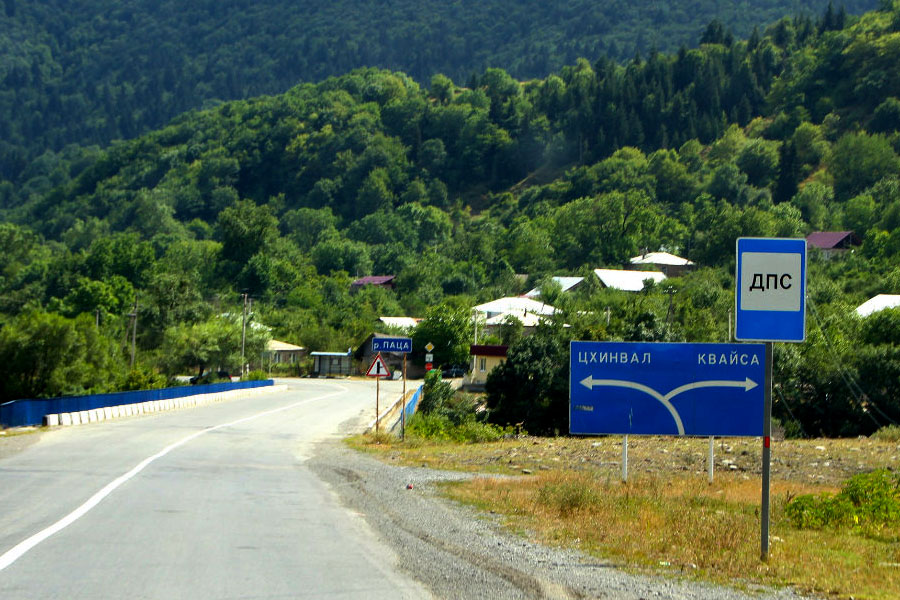
Junction to Kvaisi

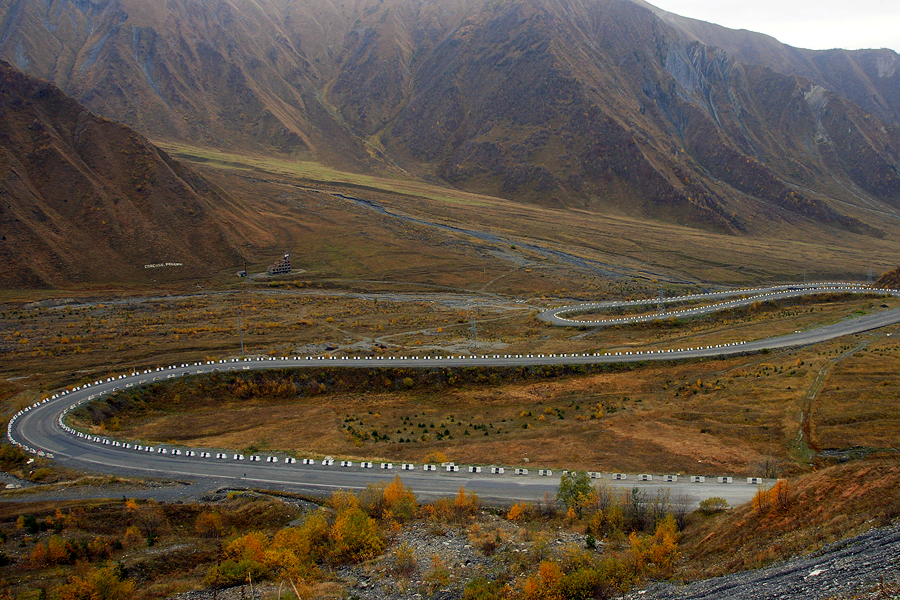
Final climb to Roki Tunnel

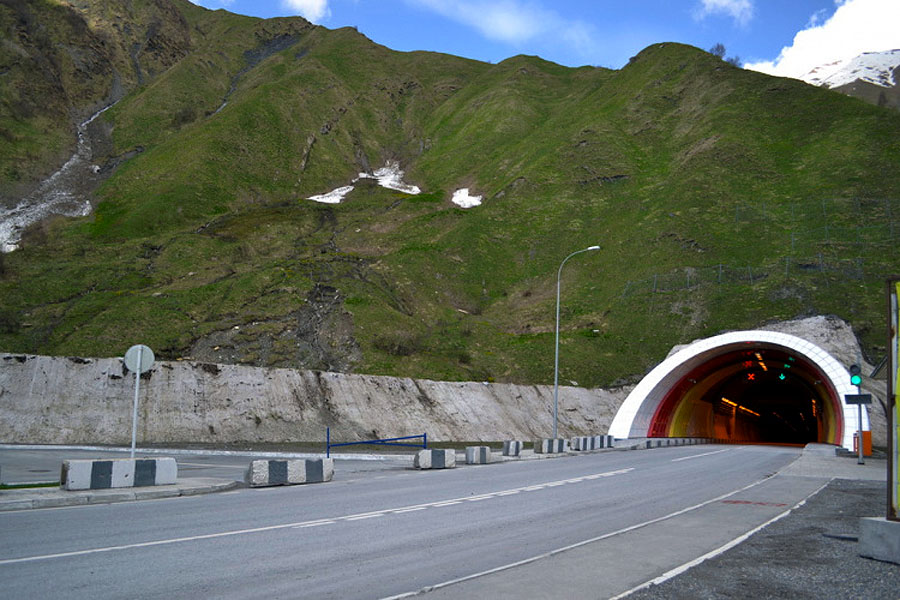
South portal Roki Tunnel

South Ossetia's administrative capital and only city Tskhinvali is located directly north from the boundary line. In South Ossetia the S10 highway is referred to as "Transkam Highway" and is literally the lifeline of the self-declared republic. The Transkam Highway is the only regular road in and out of the region as South Ossetian authorities keep crossing points to Tbilisi controlled Georgia closed for ordinary traffic. From the roadblock at Ergneti the road continues north along the Liakhvi river and circumvents the centre of Tskhinvali. After crossing the Liakhvi River the road heads north out of town and after 16 kilometres (9.9 mi) it reaches the small settlement Gupta. Here is the junction with the Sh25 road to Kvaisi, a former lead-zinc mining town.

This point is also the confluence of the Liakhvi and Patsa rivers and has one of the few highway feature highlights. The landmark 1929 Guftinsky bridge across the Patsa River is not in use anymore but is visible from the 1980s steel-concrete bridge which was built for the Transkam Highway. The old arched bridge with a length of 72 metres (236 ft) and a height of 22 metres (72 ft) was unprecedented at the time in Transcaucasia. The bridge was co-engineered with German assistance and constructed in a record time of 10 months for the original road to Kvaisi and Oni.

The Transkam Highway continues alongside the Liakhvi River, passes through Java town after a few kilometers and continues its way through the sparsely populated forested river gorge while passing a few minor settlements. It eventually reaches Lower Roki from where the road rapidly climbs to the Roki Tunnel. In winter the upper parts of the highway are frequently closed for short periods due to heavy snow.

== Intersections ==
The entire route is in Shida Kartli region. Most of the route is located in breakaway South Ossetia and is inaccessible from Georgian controlled territory with a roadblock north of Ergneti village

| Municipality | km | mi | | Destinations | Route | Notes |
|---|---|---|---|---|---|---|
| Gori | 4 | 2.5 | Exit | Tbilisi Sokhumi | S1 highway (Georgia) European route E60 AH5 | Highway to (Russia) via Zugdidi and Sokhumi |
| Gori | 10 | 6.2 | Crosses Charebula River | | | |
| Gori | 14 | 8.7 | Left junction | Dzevera | | |
| Gori | 23 | 14 | Crosses Little Liakhvi River | | | |
| Gori | 24 | 15 | Right junction | Ditsi | | |
| Gori | 30 | 19 | Ergneti roadblock. No passage. | | | |
| Gori | De facto border South Ossetia | | | | | |
| Gori | 32 | 20 | Right junction | Akhalgori | Roads in Georgia (country) | |
| Gori | 33 | 21 | Crosses Liakhvi River | | | |
| Java | 49 | 30 | Left junction | Kvaisi | Roads in Georgia (country) | |
| Java | 49 | 30 | Crosses Patsa River (200 m) | | | |
| Java | 56 | 35 | Crosses Liakhvi River | | | |
| Java | 58 | 36 | Crosses Gudisistskali River | | | |
| Java | 62 | 39 | Crosses Liakhvi River | | | |
| Java | 77 | 48 | Tunnel (130 m) | | | |
| Java | 78 | 48 | Crosses Somikhdoni River | | | |
| Java | 89 | 55 | Tunnel (360 m) | | | |
| Java | 90 | 56 | Roki Tunnel (3730 m) | | | |
| Java | 92 | 57 | Russian border. Road continues as Russian highway to Alagir | | | |
1.000 mi = 1.609 km; 1.000 km = 0.621 mi
