= Transcaucasian Highway =

Road in the South Caucasus region

The Transcaucasian Highway (Russian: Транскавказская автомагистраль) or TransKAM (ТрансКАМ) is a mountain highway in the South Caucasus region, connecting southern Russia and Georgia.

== Geography ==
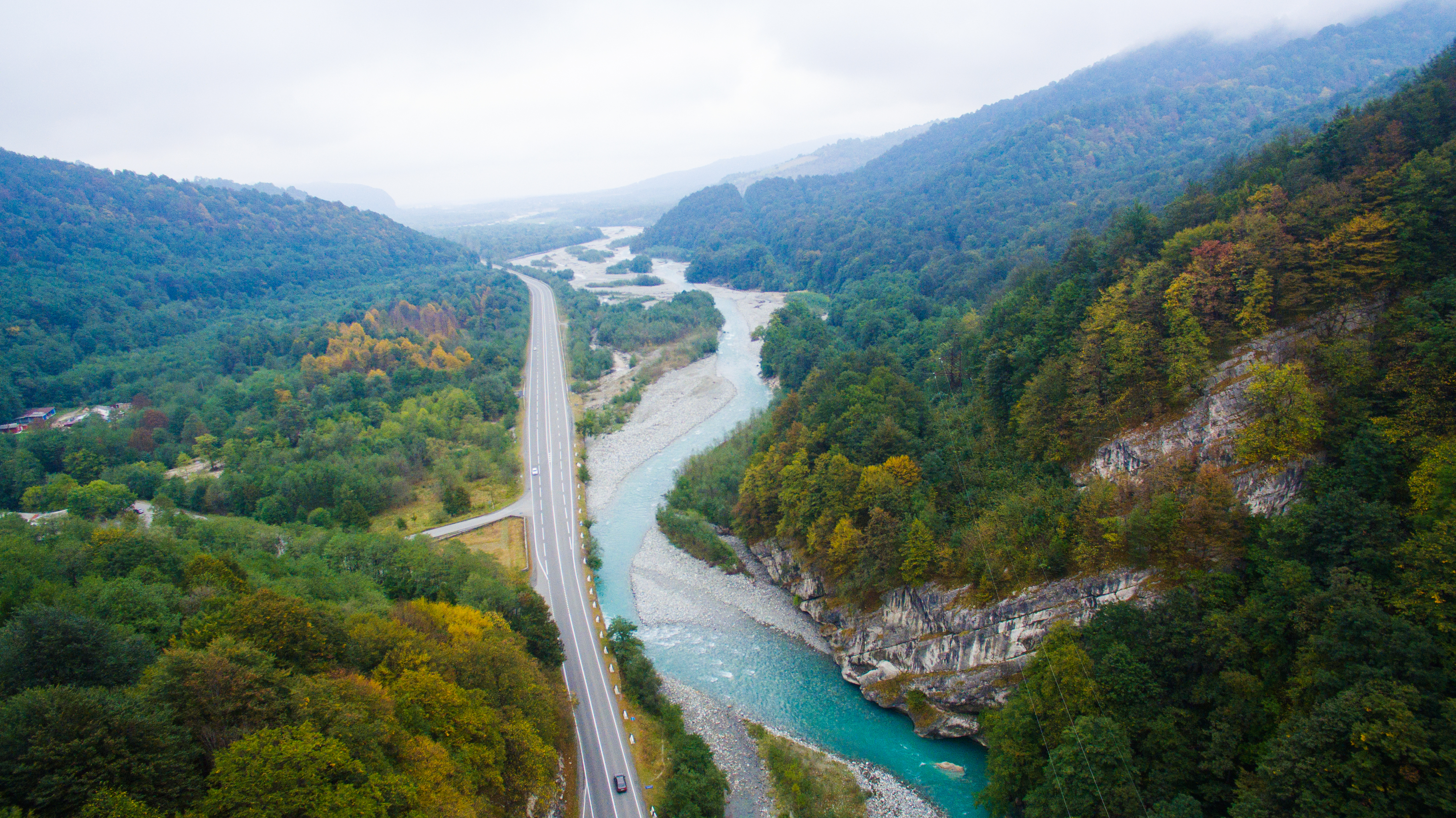
A164 highway in North Ossetia–Alania, Russia.

As the A164 highway, it crosses the Greater Caucasus mountain range through the Roki Tunnel, connecting North Ossetia–Alania and Russia with South Ossetia and Georgia. In the winter months the road is often closed due to the danger of avalanches.

In Georgia, the highway begins in Gori as S10 highway. It then crosses to Russia through the Roki Tunnel as road R297 to Alagir.

== History ==
Soviet planners considered three options for crossing the Main Caucasus ridge, a route via Roki, one via Mamison, or reconstructing the Georgian Military Highway. The Roki option was judged the most expedient, and its centrepiece is a pass tunnel of about 3.8 km designed with protection against avalanches and drifts. From Vladikavkaz the road climbs the Terek gorge through about half a dozen tunnels blasted into the cliff face before reaching the Roki Tunnel.

During the August 2008 war it carried the men and materiel Russia used in South Ossetia, with troop and fuel convoys climbing to the tunnel. The tunnel later underwent a major reconstruction that cost Moscow more than $400 million, with equipment moved from the Sochi Olympic construction sites. It reopened on 5 November 2014 and can now carry heavy and long vehicles. The work was funded under the federal programme "Development of Russia's Transportation System in 2010–2015". South Ossetia's de facto president, Leonid Tibilov, described the tunnel as a lifeline for the territory.
