= Roki Tunnel =

Mountain tunnel in Georgia and Russia

Coordinates: 42°37′N 44°6′E

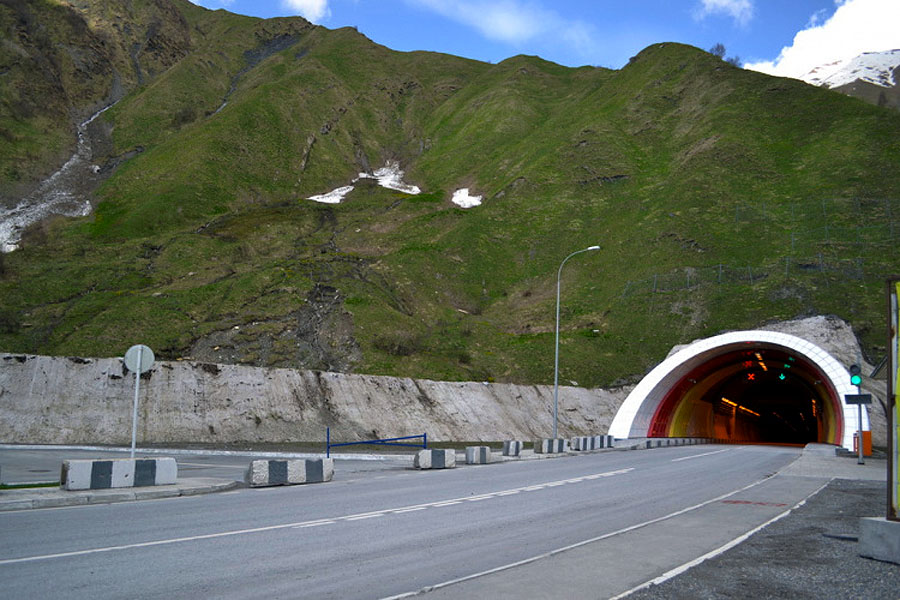
- South portal

- Location within Georgia

Overview
- Other name: Roksky Tunnel
- Location: South Ossetia, Georgia North Ossetia, Russia
- Status: active
- Route: Transcaucasian Highway
- Crosses: Roki Pass

Operation
- Opened: 1984
- Closed: 2010
- Rebuilt: 2010-2015
- Reopened: 2015

Technical
- Length: 3,730 m (12,240 ft)
- No. of lanes: 2
- Tunnel clearance: 4.75 m (15.6 ft)
- Width: 7.5 m (25 ft)

The Roki Tunnel (also known as the Roksky Tunnel; Georgian: როკის გვირაბი; Ossetian: Ручъы тъунел; Russian: Рокский туннель) is a road tunnel through the Greater Caucasus Mountains. It forms part of the Transkam road and connects North Ossetia–Alania in Russia with South Ossetia, a region internationally recognized as part of Georgia but de facto controlled by the South Ossetian authorities. The tunnel was completed in 1984 and is approximately 3,730 metres long.

The tunnel, completed by the Soviet government in 1984, is one of only a handful of routes that cross the North Caucasus Range. The tunnel lies at an elevation of approximately 2,000 metres and is 3,730 metres long. It passes beneath the Greater Caucasus near the Roki Pass, which reaches an elevation of approximately 3,000 metres and is accessible only during the summer months. The other routes between Georgia and Russia include the Kazbegi–Verkhni Lars customs checkpoint on the Georgian Military Road, closed June 2006 and reopened 2010, and the Gantiadi–Adler crossing in Abkhazia which Georgia asserts functions illegally.

The tunnel has been important throughout the Georgian–Ossetian conflict. The South Ossetian authorities use tolls levied on tunnel traffic as one of their main sources of revenue. The Georgian government, backed by the United States, has long called for the South Ossetian side of the tunnel to be placed under the control of international monitors, rather than by the South Ossetian secessionists and their Russian allies.

When the Russian authorities blocked the Kazbegi-Verkhni Lars customs checkpoint between June 2006 and March 2010, the Roki Tunnel was the only available road route from Russia to South Ossetia. The tunnel was also used as a supply route for the Russian troops during the 2008 Russo-Georgian War.

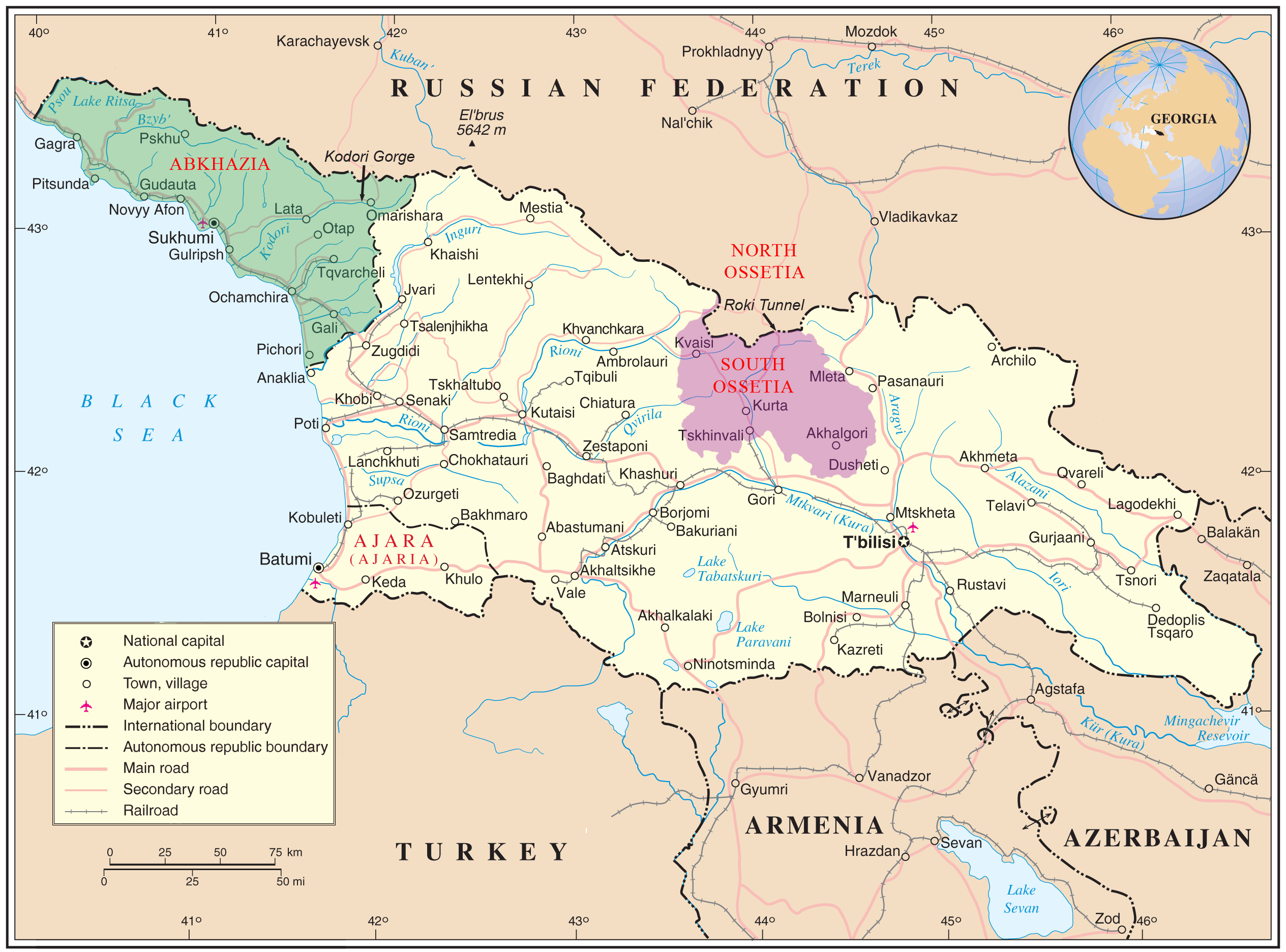
Map of Georgia showing Zemo Roka

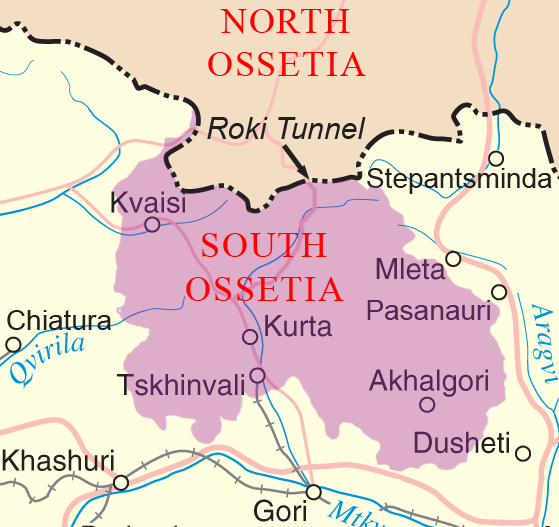
Map of South Ossetia, showing the location of the Roki Tunnel

The tunnel was reconstructed due to damage caused by Russo-Georgian War. It underwent a major reconstruction beginning in December 2010. The project was carried out in three stages. During the first stage, from December 2010 to May 2012, the service tunnel was reconstructed and adapted to carry traffic temporarily. The main tunnel was subsequently reconstructed while traffic was routed through the service tunnel. Reconstruction of the main tunnel was completed in October 2014, and the reconstructed route was officially opened on 5 November 2014. The third stage, involving the permanent reconstruction of the service tunnel, continued until October 2015.

== See also ==
- Georgian–Ossetian conflict
- 2008 Russo-Georgian War
