= Transport in the Soviet Union =

Overview of transport in USSR

Transport in the Union of Soviet Socialist Republics (USSR) was an important part of the USSR's economy. The economic centralisation of the late 1920s and 1930s led to the development of infrastructure at a massive scale and rapid pace. Before the Soviet Union's collapse in 1991, there were a wide variety of modes of transport by land, water and air. However, because of government policies before, during and after the Era of Stagnation, investments in transport were low. By the late 1970s and early 1980s Soviet economists were calling for the construction of more roads to alleviate some of the strain from the railways and to improve the state budget. The civil aviation industry, represented by Aeroflot, was the largest in the world, but inefficiencies plagued it until the USSR's collapse. The road network remained underdeveloped, and dirt roads were common outside major cities. At the same time, the attendance of the few roads they had were ill-equipped to handle this growing problem. By the late-1980s, after the death of Leonid Brezhnev, his successors tried, without success, to solve these problems. At the same time, the automobile industry was growing at a faster rate than the construction of new roads. By the mid-1970s, only 0.8 percent of the Soviet population owned a car.

Despite improvements, several aspects of the transport sector were still riddled with problems due to outdated infrastructure, lack of investment, corruption and bad decision-making by the central authorities. The demand for transport infrastructure and services was rising, but the Soviet authorities proved to be unable to meet the growing demand of the people. The underdeveloped Soviet road network, in a chain reaction, led to a growing demand for public transport. The nation's merchant fleet was one of the largest in the world.

== Civil aviation ==
The Ministry of Civil Aviation was, according to the Air Code of the USSR, responsible for all air transport enterprises and airlines established by it. Soviet civil air transport was the largest by total destinations and vehicles during most of its post-war existence. In the USSR, Aeroflot had a monopoly on all air transport. This ranged from civil and cargo transport to transporting political prisoners to the gulags, and more.

The Soviet Union covered over one sixth of the entire earth's landmass, and in the early 1920s its government decided to invest in the aviation industry. They concluded that expanding it in the Soviet Union would not only make travel more efficient and faster, it would also help develop the sprawling, mostly agricultural nation that it was. At this time, most travel required taking trains (or, as was often the case, by off-road travel in cars, buses, or trucks). Many of the northern and eastern territories in the Soviet Union were completely inaccessible during much of the year; most of these vast expanses of land lacked roads and railroads because of the huge distances between them and the nearest population centers. The extreme climate conditions also made travel and construction nearly impossible. The absence of "surface transportation facilities" also meant that very little equipment was available to use for road construction—making the process even more daunting. Consequently, the Soviet government concluded that building a series of airports scattered throughout the more isolated parts of the country would be far more economically efficient than to build thousands of miles of road and railways. The Soviet Government decided, therefore, that air travel would be the best means of transportation for people and cargo. First, a fleet was necessary; between 1928 and 1932, the number of aircraft manufacturing facilities grew from twelve to thirty-one, while the nation's annual output of airplanes increased from a mere 608 to 2,509. After combining a number of existing fleets, the Soviet government founded the national airline and air service of the Soviet Union, renaming the "USSR Civil Air Fleet" Aeroflot.

Aeroflot, at its formation in March 1932, had three main purposes. They were: to operate and maintain an air transportation system, to provide different types of services (such as aerial surveying, forest-fire fighting, and agricultural spraying) and to promote educational, recreational, athletic and other such activities for the public. Aeroflot, which literally translates to or air fleet, originally consisted of an amalgam of existing air transportation fleets in the Soviet Union in the 1920s. By creating Aeroflot, the Soviet government was, much like many industries in the young Soviet Union at the time, expanding and centralizing fleets like the "Red Air Fleet." To the general public, the aviation industry did not represent modernization; rather, it represented the means to achieve modernization and future glory.

During Joseph Stalin's Second Five-Year Plan (1933–1938), the Communist Party Congress (and Stalin himself) devised the development and further expansion of the aviation industry, soon making air transport one of the primary means of transportation in the Soviet Union. Their strategy involved creating a network of cities and towns to deliver people, whether they were politicians, military officials, prisoners or travelers, and, most importantly, mail and freight. Stalin also recognized that with a strong civil aviation sector he could supply necessary equipment and materials to prisoners in the Gulag, increasing their efficiency and production output. By 1933, Soviet aviation delegations and engineers, some for as long as six months at a time, were regular visitors at the most prominent American aircraft developers, such as Boeing, Douglas, Pratt & Whitney, and Curtiss-Wright (to name only a few). These engineers would play a key role in the origins of Soviet aircraft manufacturer, Ilyushin. For much of the Soviet Union's existence, air travel served to deliver freight. In the 1930s, freight made up 85 percent of Aeroflot's services. In fact, at this time, air travel in the Soviet Union existed as less of a means to travel, but rather a way for the government to develop remote areas of the nation for industrialization needs and resource acquisition. The public rarely flew as flights were often very expensive (350 roubles—maybe half of a workers' monthly salary) and service was poor.

Aeroflot, as the single state owned and governed airline, operated without any competitors and expanded according to the Soviet central government and central planning. By the beginning of World War II, Aeroflot, and the entirety of the Soviet civil aviation industry, was primarily a domestic freight carrier. In fact, in 1939, they surpassed the U.S. in volume of airfreight. Despite Stalin's strong xenophobia, Aeroflot commenced its first international route in 1936, operating between Moscow and Prague. After World War II, the Soviet government wanted to continue expansion by starting and increasing services from Moscow to the capitals of other Soviet republics. The ever-growing Soviet air transportation network began to shrink the railroad's importance in Soviet nations. As years passed, the Soviet regime recognized the aviation industry's increasing value, and officials in transportation planning attempted to establish regular air service to nearly every city in the union. By 1968, after Soviet engineers helped pioneer the introduction of jets and the jet age, Aeroflot and its subsidiaries served roughly 3,500 cities. At that time, "the thirty largest Soviet cities were connected with all cities with a population of 500,000 or more" (including nearly 80 percent of those with populations from 100,000 to 499,999, and 60 percent of the cities with 50,000 to 99,999 people). By joining these cities, infrastructure and industry benefitted heavily. The jet age and the introduction of new, faster, and more reliable ways of air travel greatly changed Soviet aviation. Jets not only further shortened travel times; they allowed nonstop service between cities that had been otherwise out of reach for nonstop flights. In the early 1960s prior to the jet age, the longest nonstop service from Moscow was Yekaterinburg (Sverdlovsk) (roughly 1,100 miles (1,800 km)); by the 1980s, mail could be delivered from Moscow to Vladivostok, nearly 4,000 miles (6,400 km) to the east, the same day. The Soviet Union put its first jet into service in 1956 on a Moscow to Irkutsk route of some 2,600 miles (4,200 km) using a Soviet built Tupolev Tu-104. The Soviet government established a "hubbing" system unlike the West; in the Soviet Union, most cities had a direct link with Moscow. In the United States and Europe, most small cities were and are presently connected to larger cities and their airports; airlines then use these larger airports—or "hubs"—to connect passengers to their flight and onto their destination. Because the Soviet Union essentially revolved around Moscow, this networking technique proved effective.

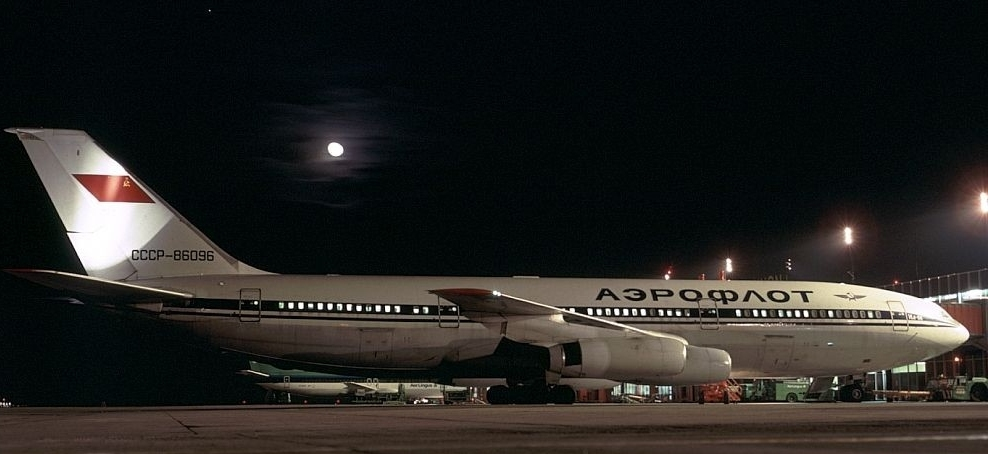
An Aeroflot Il-86 with Soviet livery.

By the early 1980s, Aeroflot had experienced massive growth in the aviation market. They carried 116.1 million passengers and millions of pounds of cargo. Still, because of travel restrictions, only 3.4 million passengers were international travelers. The airline remained an almost entirely domestic carrier, getting freight and people to far off remote cities, many of which had been built by Stalin-era Gulag prisoners. Aeroflot also remained in charge of other non-delivery or transportation services such as: "ice patrol in the Arctic Ocean and escorting of ships through frozen seas, oil exploration, power line surveillance, and transportation and heavy lifting support on construction projects." Further, because nearly every single non-military airplane permitted to fly in the Soviet Union was registered as an Aeroflot airframe, Aeroflot suffered from the worst safety reputation in the worldwide industry, recording between four hundred and five hundred incidents since its creation in 1932. Many blamed Ilyushin and their engineers for the airplanes' poorer reliability when compared to its Western counterparts—namely Boeing and McDonnell Douglas.

By the mid-to-late 1980s, Aeroflot's domestic flights were noted consistently as "harrowing" experiences for both Western and Soviet passengers. At the airport, passengers complained of long waits, poor and indifferent service at ticket offices, poorly designed and set up waiting areas at airport terminals, along with inadequate food and toilet facilities. On board, passengers complained of being forced to sit in "hot airplane cabins without air conditioning" and "indifferent" cabin crews.

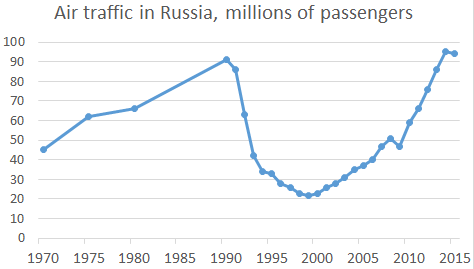
Air traffic in Russia, 1970-2015

By the time Mikhail Gorbachev introduced perestroika and its reforms in the mid-1980s, permitting free speech and pluralism, Aeroflot had shown considerable growth. In 1950, air transportation only accounted for 1.2 percent of the total passenger transportation turnover in the Soviet Union, yet, by 1987, air travel accounted for 18.8 of that. After the Soviet Union broke up in 1991, Boris Yeltsin ushered in a new, free market economy. Foreign airlines were permitted to land in Russia and Aeroflot split into several sectors, including today's airline that bears the same name. It became a privatized company, and soon other airlines found their way into the Russian spotlight. Transaero Airlines and S7 (Sibir) Airlines commenced operations in mid-1992. In 1993, Transaero became the first Russian aircraft operator to receive Boeing airplanes. Transaero only operated three Russian built Tu-214 airplanes, the rest of their fleet consists of only the Boeing (747, 777, 767)—modernizing and Westernizing Russian aviation. S7, though originally operating more Soviet-built airplanes, currently fly only Airbus and Boeing types. Aeroflot, too, followed suit. Beginning in 1994, Aeroflot began taking deliveries of Western Airplanes. Aeroflot uses its Airbus and Boeing fleet primarily on Western routes to encourage Western passenger travel. In 2006, Aeroflot joined the global airline alliance SkyTeam, and in 2010, S7 joined a different global alliance, OneWorld. The Soviet aviation industry has unequivocally shifted to adapt more modern and Western philosophies of air travel, although it was the inventive Soviet style of air transportation that helped build Russia, its industries, and its widespread global influence into what it is today.

=== Airports ===
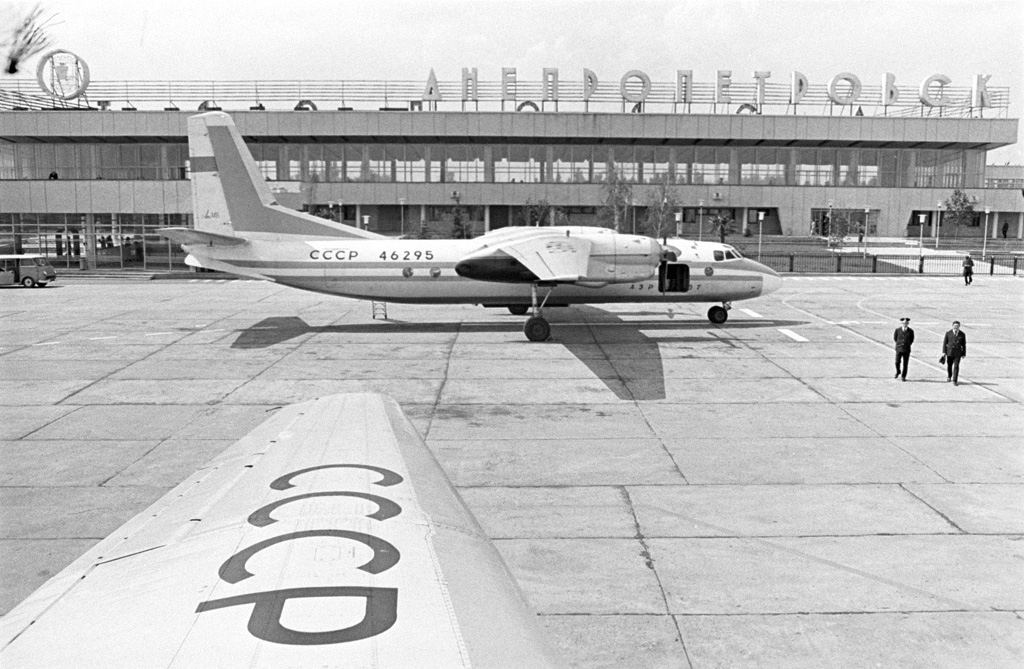
Area in front of airport building, Dnepropetrovsk, Ukraine, 1974.

The Soviet Union had 7,192 airports, of which 1,163 had paved surface. By the 1980s most airports were having capacity problems, an example being the Lviv airport which had to cope with an average of 840 passengers each day, while the airport was built to handle 200. Another daunting problem was the lack of modernisation, with the Sheremetyevo International Airport (Moscow's main airport) being the only airport in the USSR to have been fully computerised.

== Pipeline network ==
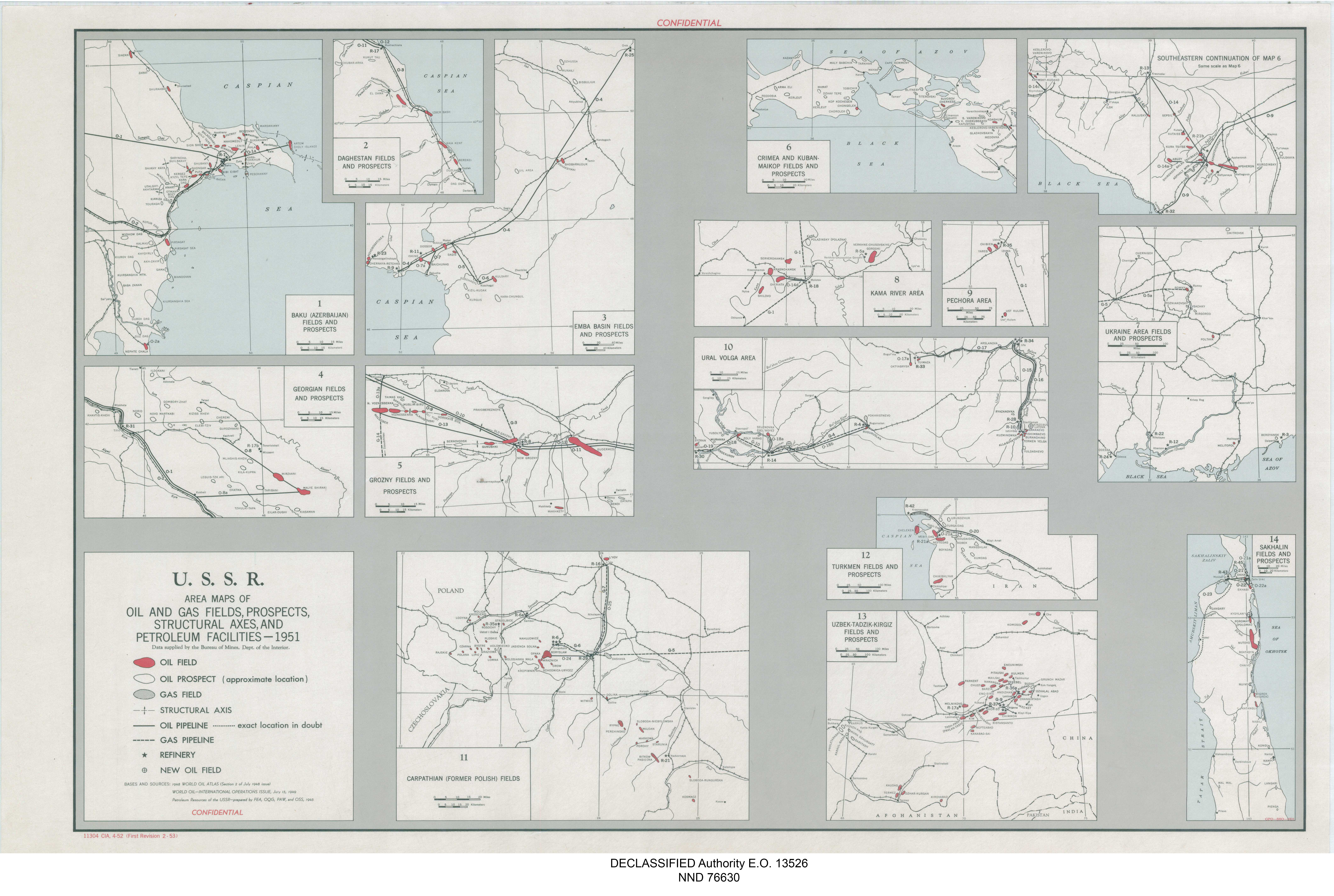
United States CIA map of pipeline infrastructure in the Soviet Union (1951)

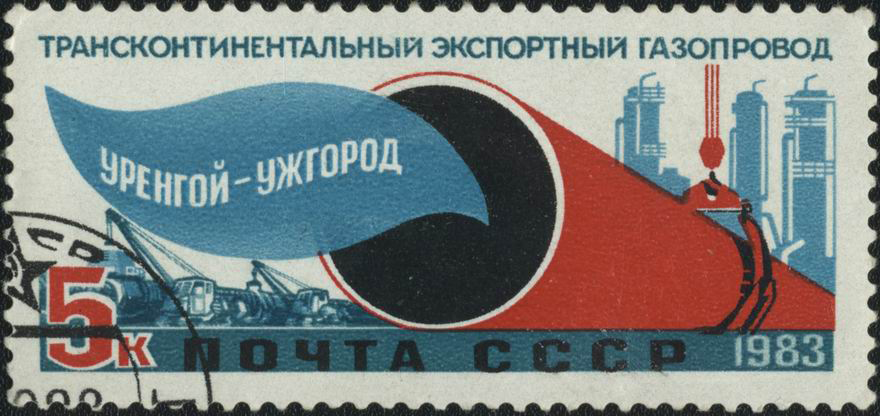
A Soviet stamp dedicated to the Urengoy–Pomary–Uzhgorod pipeline

The Soviet Union had, at its height, a pipeline network of 82,000 kilometres (51,000 mi) for crude oil and another 206,500 kilometres (128,300 mi) for natural gas. The Soviet authorities, under Leonid Brezhnev, began focusing on the national pipeline system in the 1970s. Soviet pipelines experienced a fast growth in the 1970s; by the late 1970s the pipeline network was the largest in the world. The average moving distance for oil and natural gas increased from 80 km in 1970 to 1,910 km in 1980, and 2,350 in 1988. Just as with many other sectors of the Soviet economy, bad maintenance led to deterioration. By the late 1980s only 1,500 km pipelines were under maintenance, half of what was minimally needed. Also, the storage facilities were inadequate to handle the growing Soviet oil supply. Failures in the pipelines network became, in the 1980s, a common feature of the system. Oil pipeline ruptures at oil fields were increasing up to an all-time high in 1990 and reached a 15 percent failure rate that year alone.

Among the better known pipelines were the Northern Lights line from the Komi petroleum deposit to Brest on the Polish border, the Soiuz line running from Orenburg to Uzhgorod near the Czechoslovak and Hungarian borders, and the Export pipeline from the Urengoy gas field to L'vov and thence to First World countries, including Austria, Italy, West Germany, France, Belgium, and the Netherlands. The 1,420-millimeter Export pipeline was 4,451 kilometers long. It crossed the Ural and Carpathian Mountains and almost 600 rivers, including the Ob', Volga, Don, and Dnepr. It had 41 compressor stations and a yearly capacity of 32 billion cubic meters of natural gas.

== Rail network ==
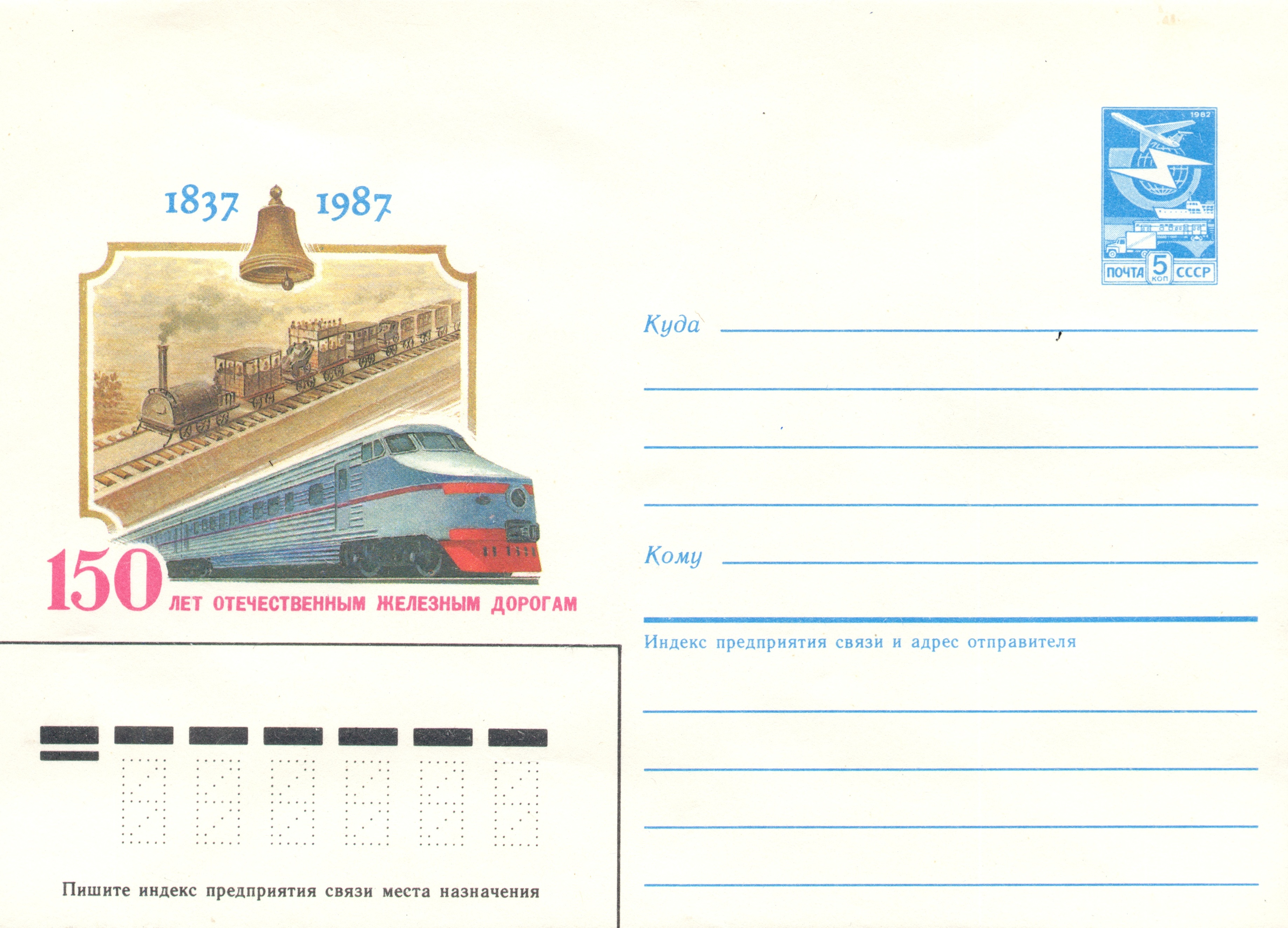
A Soviet envelope celebrating the 150th anniversary of the first railways

The Soviet Union had a non-industrial railway network of 147,400 kilometres (91,600 mi), of which 53,900 kilometres (33,500 mi) were electrified. As the quality of rail transport deteriorated in the early years, in part because of the Russian Civil War, some within the Soviet leadership claimed that the railways were not sustainable if congestions continued to increase. Those who advocated for an enlargement of rail transport felt that increased investment and the lengthening of already established rail tracks could solve the ongoing congestion crisis. The majority agreed on increasing investments, but there was no clear consensus on how these investments were to be used. There were even some who believed in the recapitalisation of the railways. Gosplan economists in the meantime advocated for the rationalisation of the railways, coupled with tariffs based on actual cost, which would reduce traffic demand and provide funds for investment. The leadership was unable to reach a conclusion and the rail system continued to deteriorate. In 1931, in a Central Committee (CC) resolution, it was decided that increased investments coupled with the introduction of newer trains could solve the crisis. This resolution was never carried out, and yet again, the system continued to deteriorate.

The Central Committee ordered Lazar Kaganovich to solve the railway crisis in 1935. Kaganovich first prioritised bottleneck areas over other less-traveled areas; his second priority was investing in heavy traffic lines, and thirdly, the least efficient areas of the rail network were left to themselves. Another problem facing rail transport was the massive industrialisation efforts pushed on by the authorities. The industrialisation proved to be a heavy burden on the railways, and Vyacheslav Molotov and Kaganovich even admitted this to the 18th party congress. Even so, the Soviet Government continued their industrialisation efforts to better prepare themselves for a future war with Germany, which became reality in 1941.

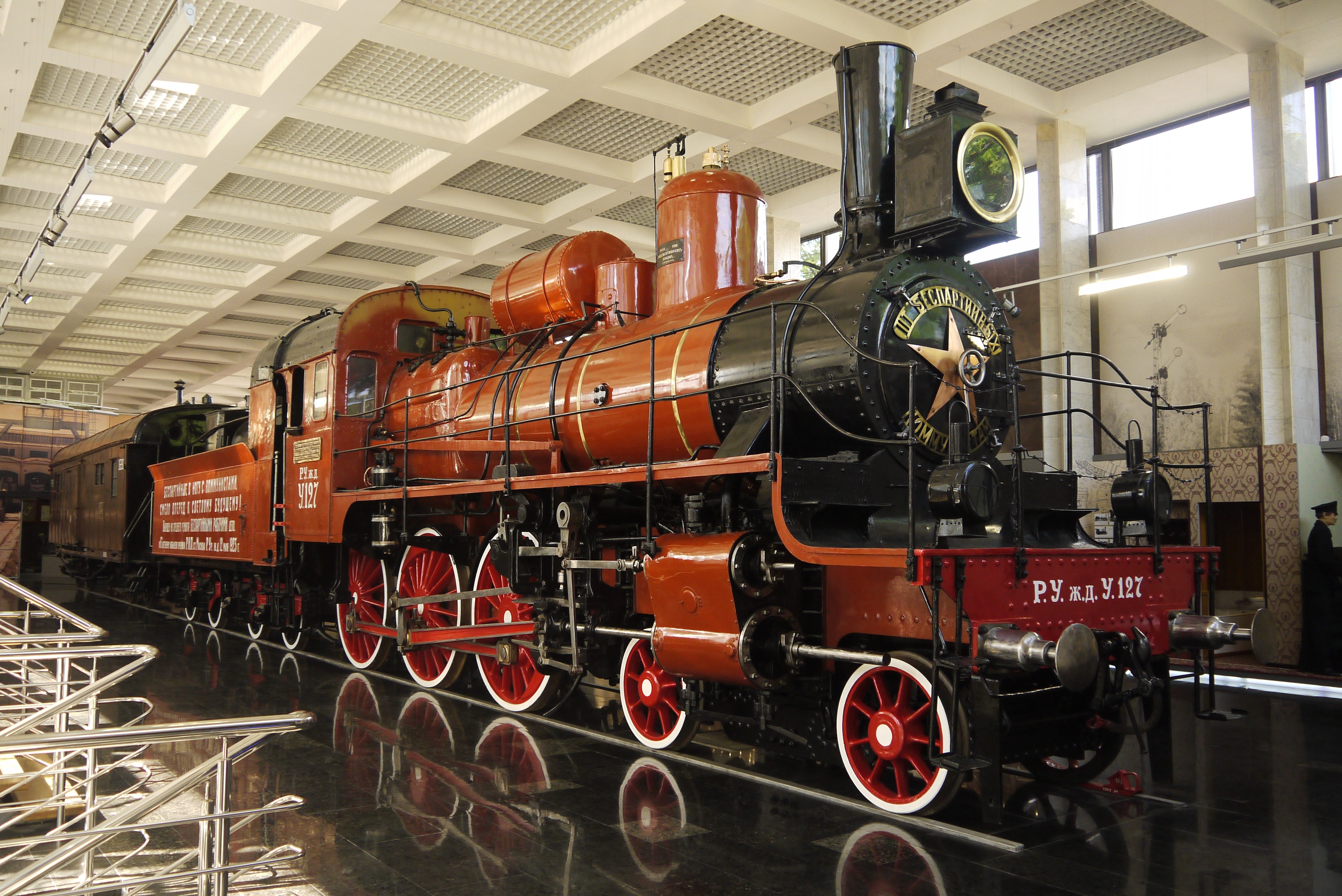
Russian locomotive class U - U-127 Lenin's 4-6-0 oil burning compound locomotive preserved at the Museum of the Moscow Railway at Paveletsky Rail Terminal

Soviet rail transport became, after the Great Patriotic War, one of the most developed in the world, surpassing most of its First World counterparts. The Soviet railway system was growing in size, at a rate of 639 km a year from 1965 to 1980, while the growth of rail transport in First World countries was either decreasing or stagnating. This steady growth in rail transport can be explained by the country's need to extract its natural resources, most of which were located close to, or in Siberia. While some problems with the railways had been reported by the Soviet press, the Soviet Union could boast of controlling one of the most electrified railway systems at the time. During much of the country's later lifespan, trains usually carried coal, oil, construction material (mostly stone, cement and sand) and timber. Oil and oil products were one of the key reasons for building railway infrastructure in Siberia in the first place.

The efficiency of the railways improved over time, and by the 1980s it had many performance indicators superior to that of the United States. By the 1980s Soviet railways had become the most intensively used in the world. Most Soviet citizens did not own private transport, and if they did, it was difficult to drive long distances due to the poor conditions of many roads. Another explanation has to do with Soviet policy, the first being the autarkic model created by Joseph Stalin's regime. Stalin's regime had little interest in rail transport, or any other form for transport, and instead focused most of the country's investments in rapid industrialisation. Stalin's regime was not interested in establishing new railway lines, but decided to conserve, and later expand, much of the existing railways left behind by the Tsars. However, as Lev Voronin, a First Deputy Premier of the Soviet Union, noted in a speech to the Supreme Soviet of the Soviet Union in 1989; the railway sector was the "main negative sector of the economy in 1989". As industrial output declined in the late-1980s so did the demand for transportation, which led to a decline in freight transport in return.

=== Rapid transit ===
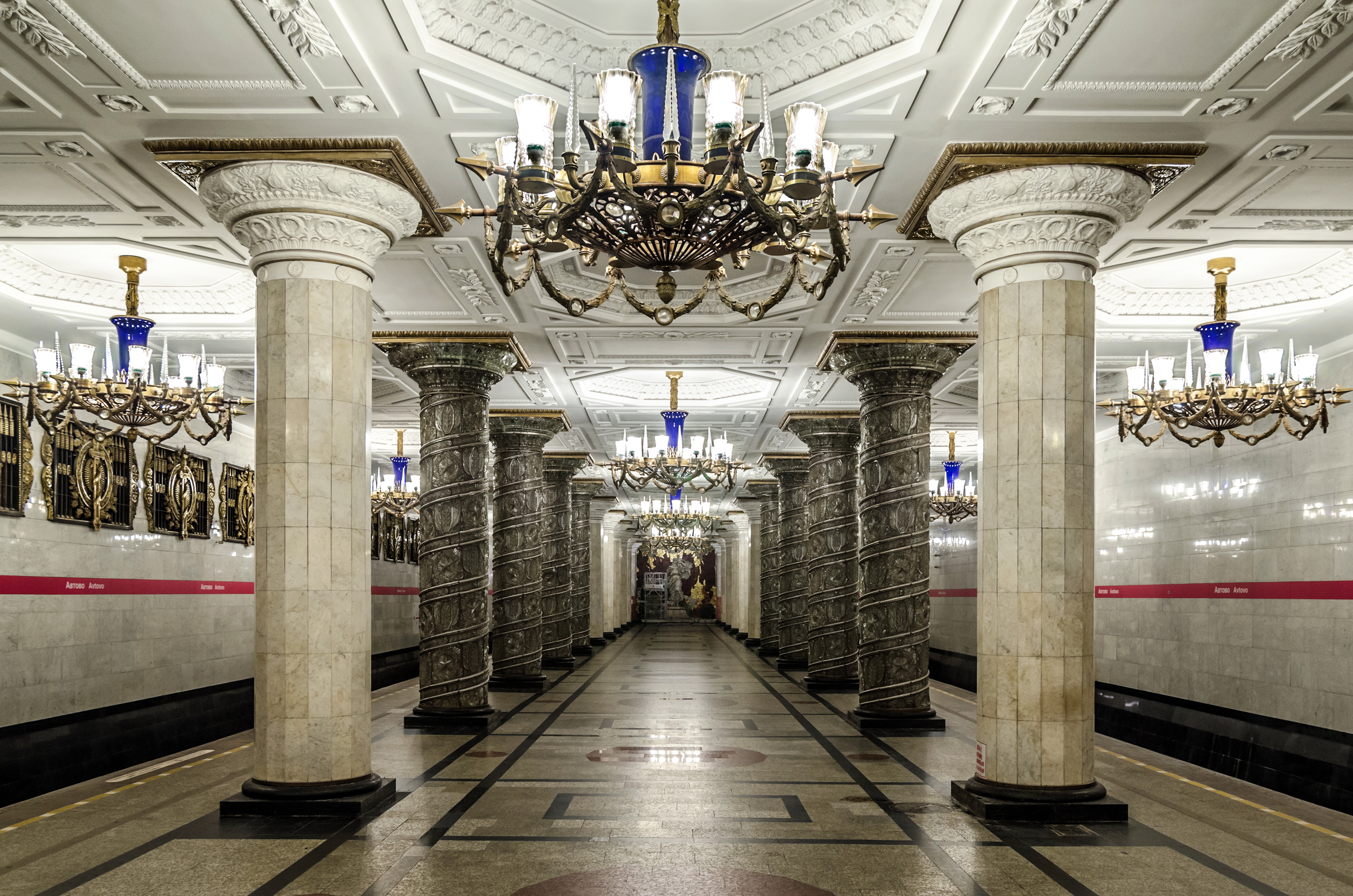
Avtovo station, decorated metro stations were common in the Soviet Union.

The Soviet rapid transit system was seen as the quickest, cleanest and cheapest way of urban transport, and eventually another point acquired greater significance; the authorities could allocate their resources from the automobile industry to the rapid transit sector and save a substantial volume of the country's diesel and petrol. Because rapid transit systems usually were cheaper to operate and less energy consuming, the Soviet authorities managed to install 20 rapid transit systems in their union, and had an additional nine under construction when it collapsed. Twenty other stations were under construction in 1985. The country's rapid transit system was the most extensively used in the world.

== Road network ==
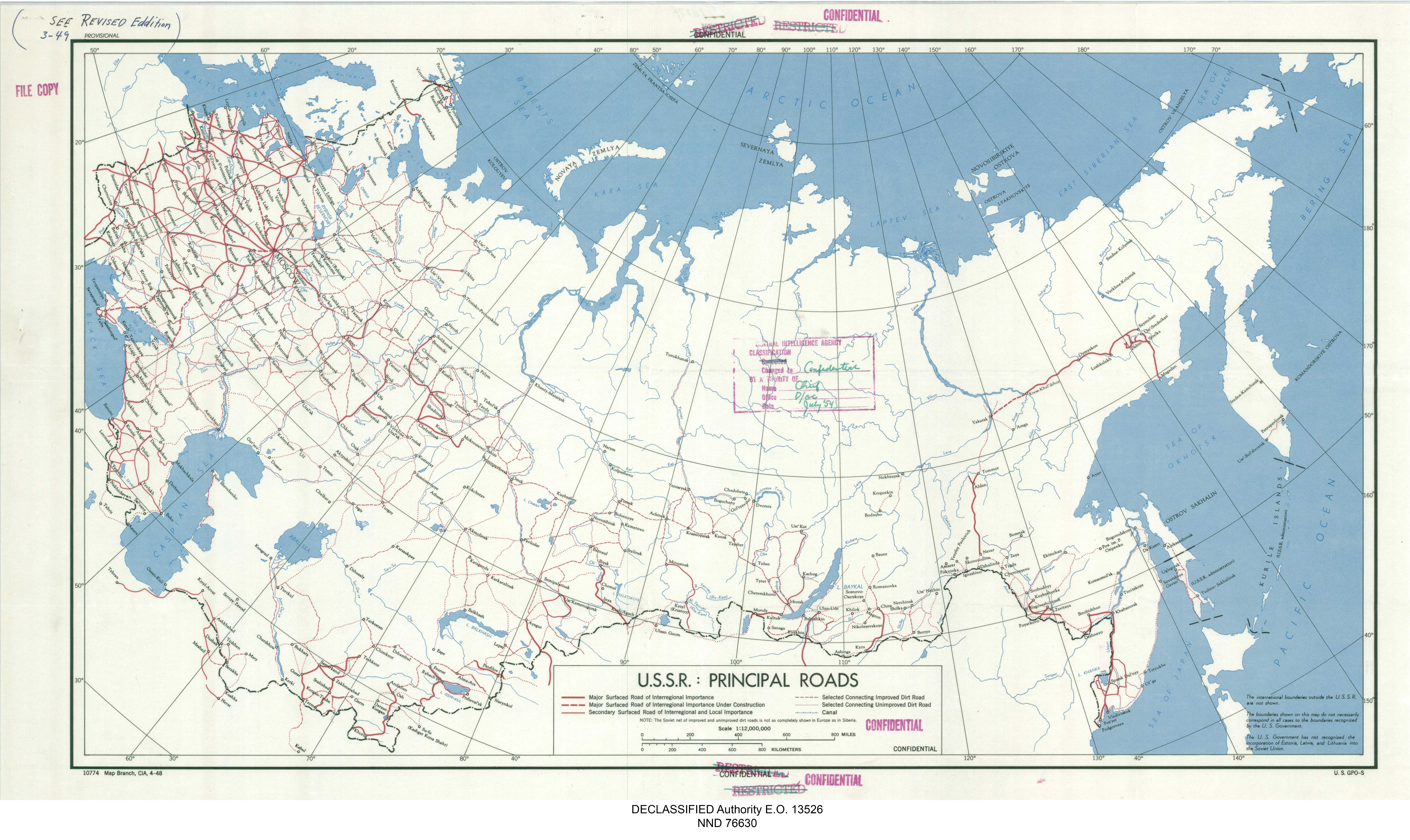
Road map of the Soviet Union, 1948

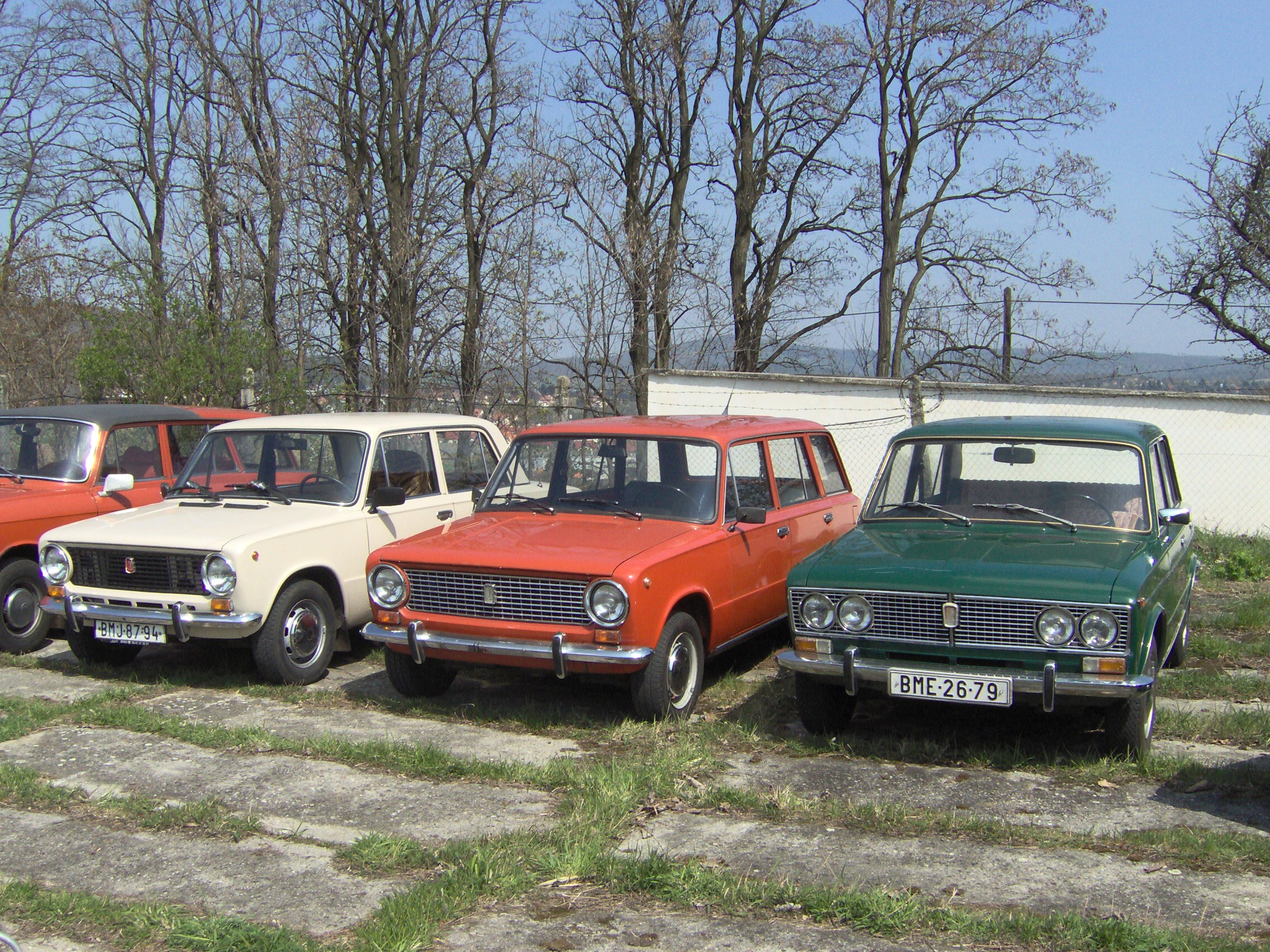
Early Soviet car models (left to right): VAZ-2101 (1970), VAZ-2102 (1971) and VAZ-2103 (1972)

The Soviet Union had a road network of 1,757,000 kilometres (1,092,000 mi), of which 1,310,600 kilometres (814,400 mi) were paved and 446,400 kilometres (277,400 mi) were dirt roads. Road transport played a minor role in the Soviet economy, compared to domestic rail transport or First World road transport. According to historian Martin Crouch, road traffic of goods and passengers combined was only 14 percent of the volume of rail transport. It was only late in its existence that the Soviet authorities put emphasis on road construction and maintenance because of the vital role road transport usually played in the regional economies of the USSR. Road transport was of vital importance to agriculture, mining and the construction industry, but it also played a significant role in the urban economy. The road network had problems meeting the people's demand, a problem which the Soviet leadership publicly acknowledged. A resolution by the Central Committee laid down a plan for the improvement in planning, organisation and the efficiency of local road transport enterprises.

Freight transport by motor vehicles, commonly called "motor transport" by the Soviet authorities, due to the underdeveloped nature of the nation's road network, was of considerable significance to certain areas of the economy. In the 1980s, there were 13 million laborers employed in the transport sector. Of those, about 8.5 million were employed in motor transport. Inter-city freight transport remained underdeveloped during the whole Soviet epoch, with it constituting less than 1 percent of the motor-borne freight average. These developments can again be blamed on cost and administrative inefficiencies. Road transport as a whole lagged far behind that of rail transport; the average distance moved by motor transport in 1982 was 16.4 kilometres (10.2 mi), while the average for railway transport was 930 km per ton and 435 km per ton for water freight. In 1982 there was a threefold increase in investment since 1960 in motor freight transport, and more than a thirtyfold increase since 1940. Inter-city transport and the volume of road freight transport had also increased significantly. Motor transport was much cheaper and flexible over short distances (defined as less than 200 km) than rail transport. There were many Soviet economists who argued that transferring some 100 million tons from the railways to road transport would save up to 120 million roubles. But in 1975, road transport was 27-times more expensive than railway transport, due to long distances between starting points and destinations.

The deteriorating quality of roads was due to bad attendance, and the then ongoing growth in road transport made it even harder for the Soviet authorities to focus their resources on attendance and maintenance projects. The transport of freight by road had increased by 4,400 percent in the past thirty years, while the growth of hardcore surfaced roads had grown only by 300 percent. Growth of motor vehicles had increased by 224 percent in the 1980s, while hardcore surfaced roads only increased by 64 percent. As Soviet economists in the early to mid-1980s said, the Soviet Union had 21 percent of the world's industrial output, but only a meager 7 percent of the world's top quality roads. The Eleventh Five-Year Plan (1981–85; spanned through the rules of Leonid Brezhnev, Yuri Andropov and Konstantin Chernenko) called for the construction of an additional 80,000 km hardcore surfaced roads, but this was far from adequate in solving the serious shortage, and the planners needed to build at least twice as many roads to meet consumer demand. Another obstacle was that Five-Year Plans in the USSR's later life were rarely fulfilled due to economic malfunctions. Many roads were not paved, and because of this shortage, several dirt roads were created. By 1975 only 0.8 percent of households owned a car. Productions of cars, however, had increased dramatically in the late 1970s. From 1924 to 1971 the USSR produced 1 million vehicles, and the government passed another milestones five years later when it had produced 2 million vehicles.

=== Bus transport ===
Only a very small proportion of the population in the USSR owned cars. Because of the widespread lack of any mode of private transport, most Soviet citizens travelled via public transport. Due to a relative shortage of cars and good-quality roads, the Soviet people travelled twice as much by bus, train and rapid transit as people in the First World. Soviet bus-transport, throughout most of the history of the Soviet Union, was controlled either by the regional or the republican branches of the Ministry of Transport. Hundreds of thousands of bus stops were built during the Soviet Union, often following centralized design rules, but sometimes not. In recent years the term Soviet Bus Stops, coined by photographer Christopher Herwig, covers these examples of architecture and road design that were built between 1960s-1980s.

Since rail transit systems were more environmental and consumed little fuel, Soviet planners concentrated their efforts in constructing electricity-driven, rather than fuel-consuming transport. In the mid-1980s the government initiated a programme for compressed-gas energy for buses. By 1988 only 1.2 percent of buses used gas energy, while 30 percent used diesel. Soviet bus-enterprises ran a deficit for the first time in their history by the mid-to-late 1980s.

== Water transport ==
The Soviet Union had 42,777 kilometres (26,580 mi) of coastline and 1,565 ships in the merchant marine. Marine industry was under the control of the Ministry of the Merchant Marine Fleet of the USSR.

=== Merchant marine ===
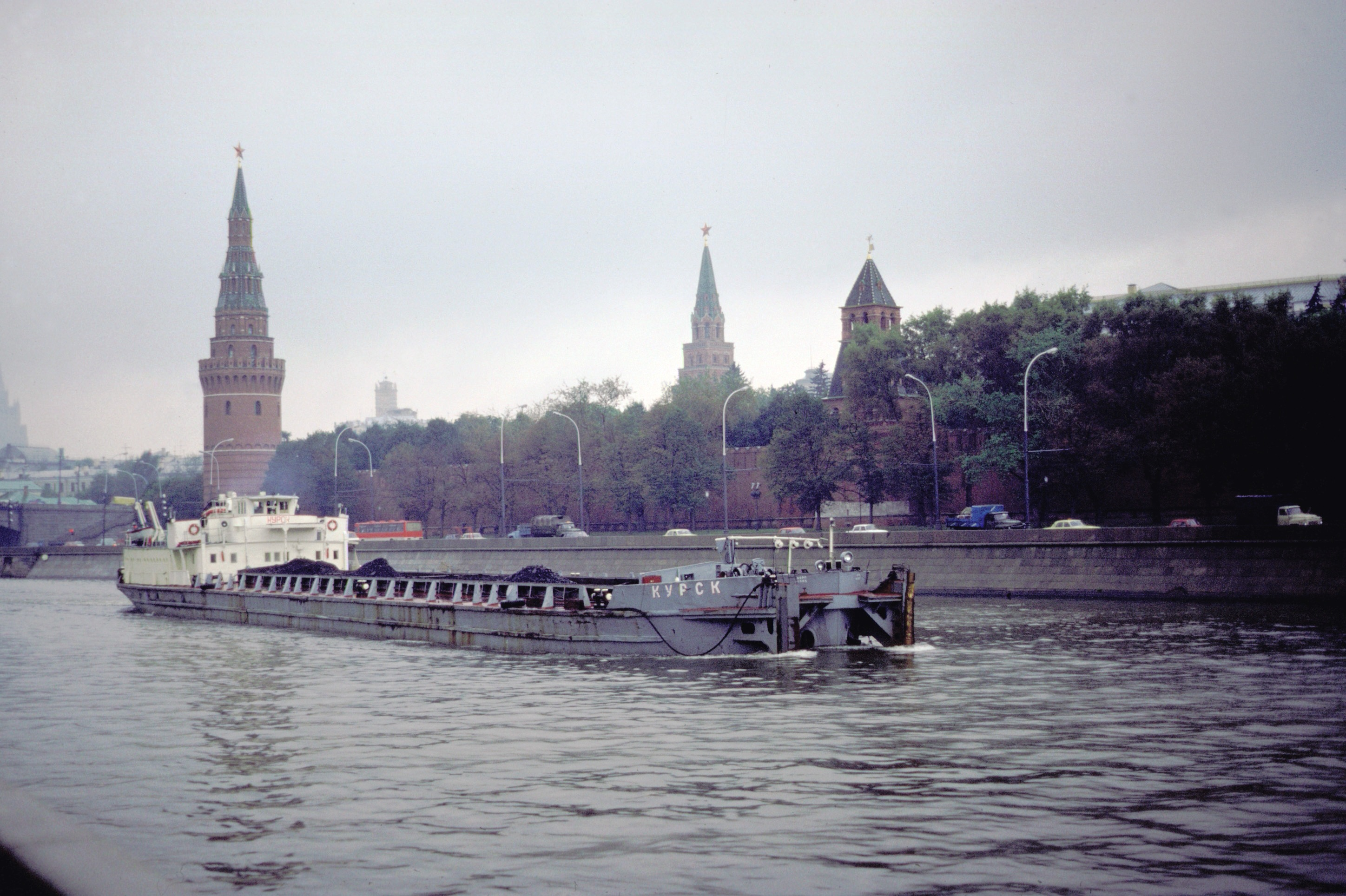
A freight boat in the Moskva River

The Russian Empire concentrated much of its investment on constructing new shipbuilding facilities, and not enlarging their merchant marine; this policy continued in the prewar USSR. By 1913, 85 percent of all merchant ships were foreign built. The merchant marine was overlooked during the regime of Joseph Stalin, because the USSR traded mostly with its neighbouring countries in the Eastern Bloc. Soviet trade later expanded to its neighbouring countries in Asia. When Stalin died in 1953, his successor started to increase trade with non-communist countries, most of which were on other continents. Due to this policy, the merchant marine increased from 2 million deadweight tonnage in the early 1950s to 12 million in 1968. By 1974 it had reached 14.1 million deadweight tons, about 3 percent of the world's total. Of the 114 million tons moved by the Soviet merchant marine in 1974, 90 million of it was export and import.

While the merchant marine was technologically outdated, and slower than that of the First World, it still attracted a consistent volume of cargo. The reason for the technological backwardness of the merchant marine were First World induced boycotts of Soviet shipping. This led the Soviet Union to become isolated from the international shipping industry, and skip over such important innovations as shipping containers. Under Mikhail Gorbachev's rule the Soviet Union became the largest buyer of new ships in the world. Because of the size of its navy, the Soviet Government advocated for the traditional freedoms of the sea.

By 1990 the Soviet Union operated a large merchant fleet with more than 2400 ships of all types — the world's second largest in number of ships and seventh largest in carrying capacity.

=== Ports ===
The Soviet Union had 26 major ports, eleven of them inland ports. There were 70 ports in total. None of the ports could be considered major by world standards. By the 1980s the majority of Soviet ports were lagging behind the First World technologically. There were also a high number of surplus workers, many of whom would become redundant if the USSR would introduce new, more advanced, technology. Also, in the northeast territories of the USSR most ports were closed down due to cold climate.

== See also ==
- Transport in Russia
- Government of the Soviet Union – Ministries
  - Ministry of Civil Aviation of the USSR
  - Ministry of the Merchant Marine Fleet of the USSR
  - Ministry of Railways of the USSR
  - Ministry of Transport Construction of the USSR
- The Museum of the Moscow Railway
- Soviet infrastructure in Central Asia

== Bibliography ==
- Ambler, John; Shaw, Denis J.B.; Symons, Leslie (1985). Soviet and East European transport problems. Taylor & Francis. ISBN 978-0-7099-0557-8.
- Davies, Robert William; Harrison, Mark; Wheatcroft, S.G. (1994). The Economic transformation of the Soviet Union, 1913-1945. Cambridge University Press. ISBN 978-0-521-45770-5.
- Grzybowski, Kazimierz (1987). Soviet international law and the world economic order. Duke University Press. ISBN 978-0-8223-0734-1.
- Highman, Robert D.S.; Greenwood, John T.; Hardesty, Von (1998). Russian aviation and air power in the twentieth century. Routledge. ISBN 978-0-7146-4784-5.
- Wilson, David (1983). The demand for energy in the Soviet Union. Taylor & Francis. ISBN 978-0-7099-2704-4.
- World Bank and OECD (1991). A Study of the Soviet economy. Vol. 3. International Monetary Fund. ISBN 978-92-64-13468-3.
- Громов, Н.Н.; Панченко, Т.А.; Чудновский, А.Д. (1987). Единая Транспортная Система (Unified Transportation System). Москва: Транспорт.
- Шафиркин, Б.И, "Единая Транспортная Система СССР и бзаимодействие пазличных видов транспорта" (Unified Transportation System of the USSR and interaction of various modes of transportation), Москва, Высшая школа, 1983.
