= Soviet infrastructure in Central Asia =

Much of the influence of the Soviet Union can be seen in the infrastructure of Central Asia. Central Asia is a nexus of said infrastructure for transportation, goods delivery and energy distribution. Much of the industrial infrastructure had greatly declined in the 1990s, after the fall of the Soviet Union, especially in Kyrgyzstan and Tajikistan. The roads, railroads and energy lines are thus oriented towards the Russian Federation and away from other regional neighbors, such as China, Afghanistan or Iran.

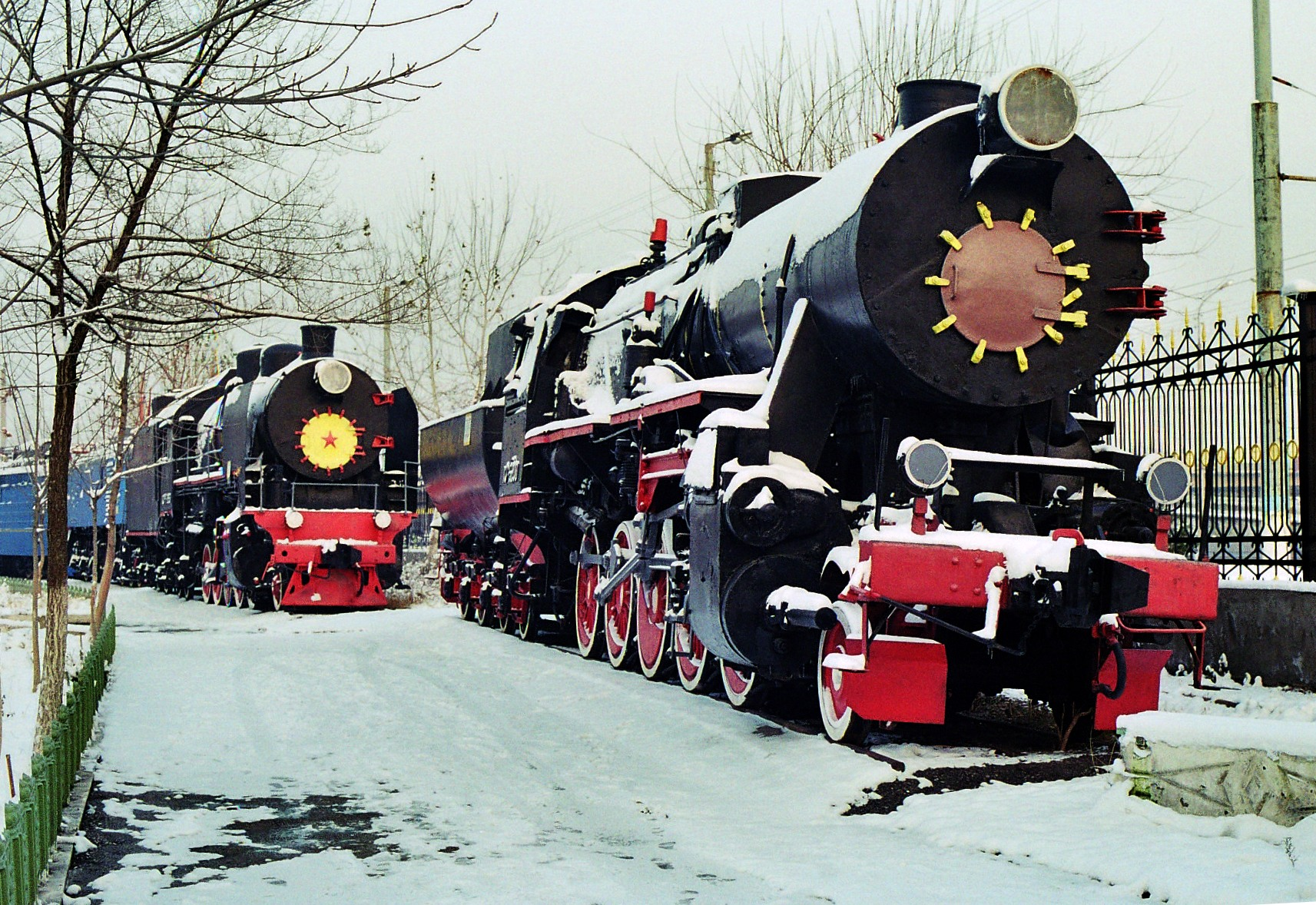
Soviet steam locomotive Tashkent

== Railroad Transportation ==
The Central Asian railroad network was designed primarily with the needs of former Soviet Union planners in mind. The entire Soviet railways system was built with Moscow at its core. Consequently, Central Asian railroads are mainly oriented north-south and (now-existing) borders were disregarded in planning. As a result, virtually all freight cargo from Central Asia to Russia crosses Kazakhstan, including trade with Europe. Uzbekistan also has significant transit traffic.

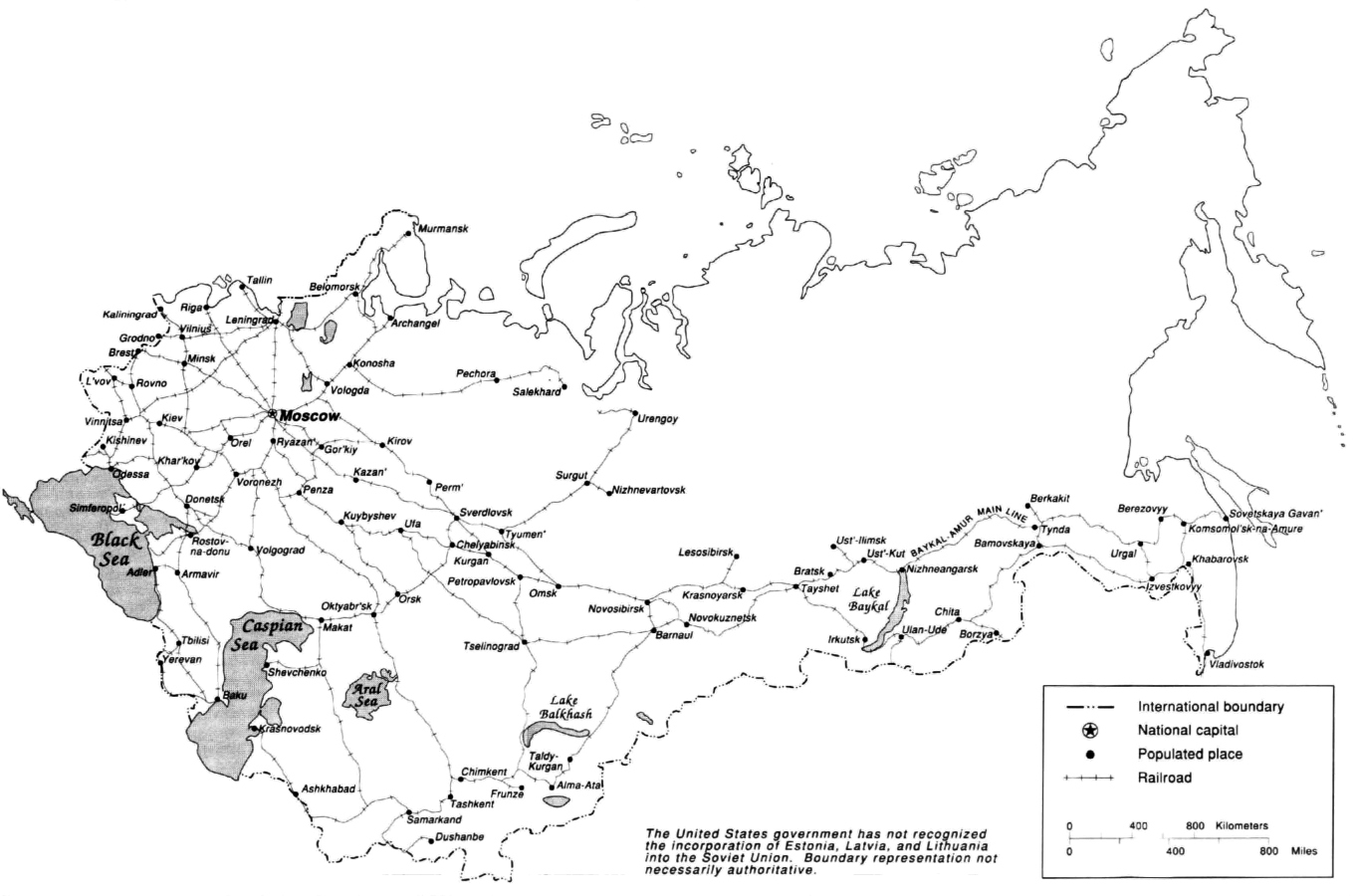
Major Soviet Railroads, 1986

The total length of the rail network in the four CARs is about 19,600 kilometers (km) but size varies by country.

- Kazakhstan has about 14,600 km of main line of which 37% are double-track and 28% are electrified.
- Uzbekistan has about 4,000 km including the 400 km of new line constructed in the last 2–3 years. About 150 km are double track and about 10% are electrified.
- The other Central Asian countries are mostly single track and not electrified. In 2004, main lines consisted of 426 km in the Kyrgyz Republic mostly in the north, and 533 km in Tajikistan including 106 km in the north.

=== Soviet Rail Management ===
During the Soviet era, railways of the Central Asian countries were under the auspices of the Ministry of Railways, separated regionally into:

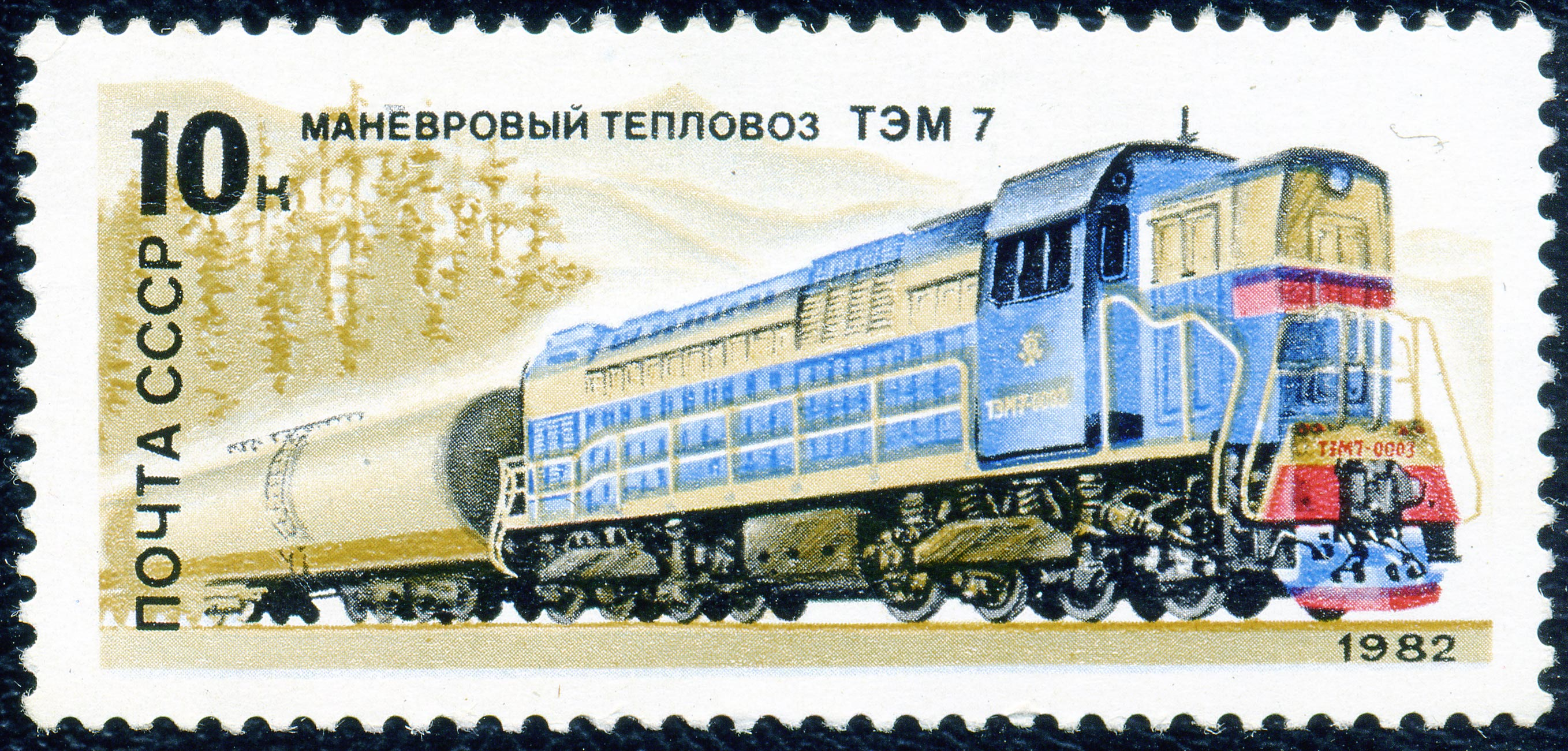
Diesel-locomotive shunter TEM-7

1. Alma-Ata Railway Bureau (southern Kazakhstan and northern Kyrgyzstan)
2. Tselinnaya Railway Bureau (northern Kazakhstan)
3. West-Kazakhstan Railway Bureau
4. Central Asian Railway Bureau (entire Central Asian region excluding Kazakhstan and northern Kyrgyzstan)

The Kazakh Railroad is one of the 7 divisions of the Southern Urals Railroad. It was formed in 1958 out of the Turkestan-Siberian and Karaganda railroads and sections of the former Tashkent, Orenburg, and Southern Urals railroads. The principal trunk line connected Kazakhstan to the Urals and the Volga region. The Kinel'-Orenburg-Iletsk trunk line connected the European regions of the USSR with Kazakhstan and the rest of Central Asia. The principal commodities transported were coal (22%), ferrous metals (12%), oil (10%), and building materials (9%). The Southern Urals Railroad was awarded the Order of the October Revolution in 1971. In 1971, this railroad had 13,250 km of track, representing 9% of the total rail network of the USSR. While some of the lines were built in 1915-17, 80% of the lines were built in the Soviet period. In 1971, the Kazakh Railroad was awarded the Order of Lenin.

After independence, each country nationalized and progressively took control of their own railways. Kazakhstan's three companies were merged into a single one in 1997.

Due to the specialization in the railway manufacturing sector under the COMECON regime (Council for Mutual Economic Assistance – the Soviet international assistance framework), most passenger cars were made in East Germany, locomotives were made in Russia and Czechoslovakia. As there are no railroad locomotive or car manufacturers in Central Asia, there is a constant shortage of spare parts and an inability to properly maintain railroad vehicles.

In the USSR, the power supply system of an electric railroad is closely tied to the overall power system. Electricity arrives from substations in high-voltage power transmission lines, is converted, and then transmitted over feed and negative booster lines to the contact system and then to the rolling stock. Depending on the equipment in the rolling stock, the power may be supplied over DC systems using single-phase systems at the commercial frequency (50 hertz) or lower (16 2/3 or 25 Hz). The DC systems in the USSR had a nominal voltage of 3 kilovolts. In 1956, the Central Committee of the Soviet Union adopted the General Plan for the Electrification of Railroads - after which major rail routes were upgraded.

=== Rail gauge ===
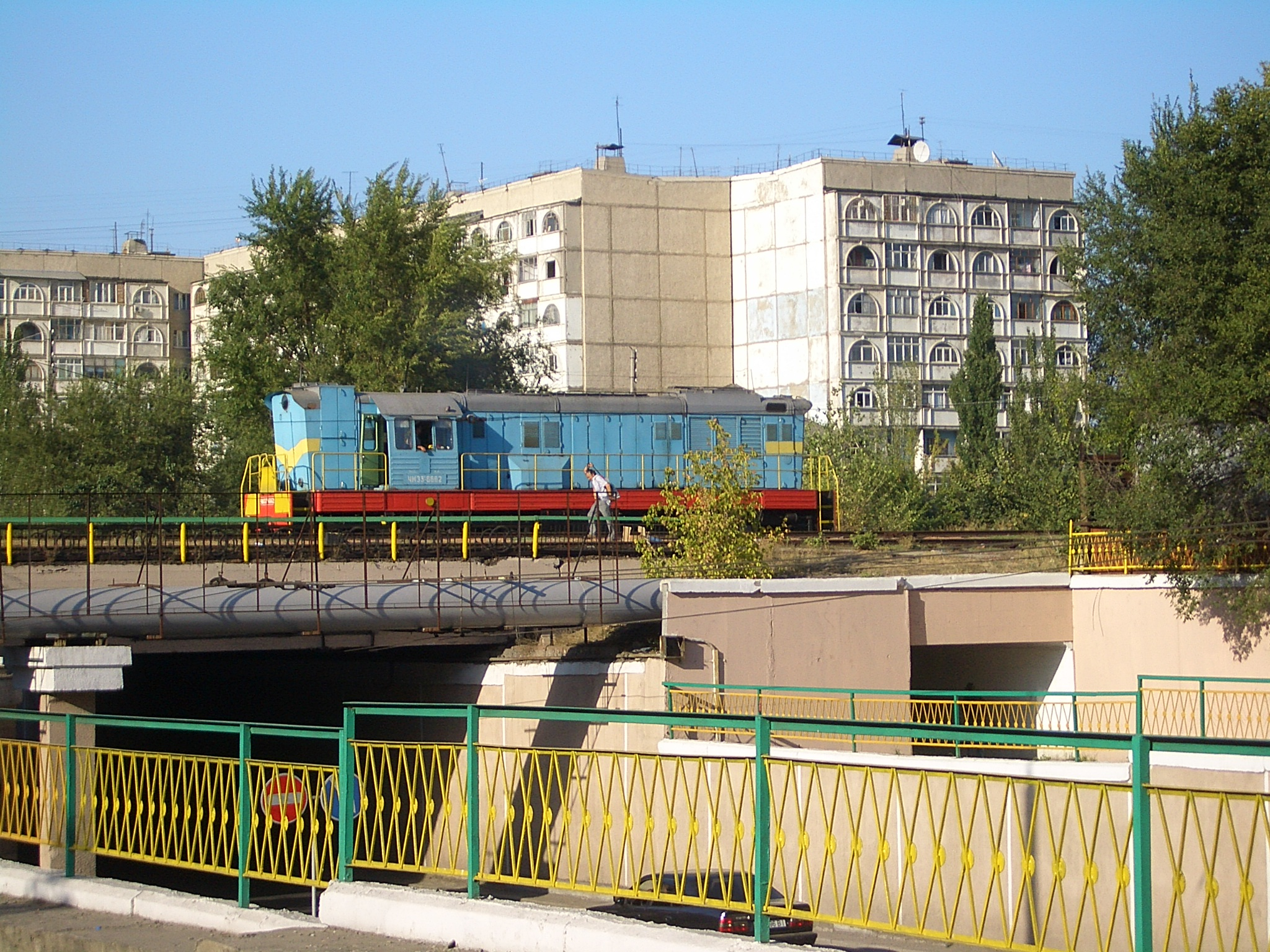
Bishkek rail overpass

Rail gauge in former Soviet territory differs from the gauge in the rest of the world. Rail tracks in the former Soviet territories are on a broad-gauge track of 1,524 millimeters (60 inches) versus the global standard gauge of 1,435 millimeters used in China, most of Europe, North America, most of Australia, Iran and Turkey. The Russian Empire and the Soviet Union intentionally used a different gauge (ostensibly to block invaders from entering Russia by rail). Consequently, trains on the current rail line from China to Kazakhstan must stop at the border, where cargo is unloaded and then reloaded onto trains on the broad-gauge rail line in Kazakhstan for transit through Central Asia.

During Soviet times, locomotives and wagons were regularly supplied on the basis of estimated needs. When the Soviet Union broke up, shares of the Soviet wagon fleet were allocated to the various republics; the smaller ones did not get the better deals. As a feature of the Soviet system, state-owned rail companies provide provided social welfare services such as free education and housing to their workers. After independence, each country had to figure out how to address these obligations (without Soviet funding). In Soviet times, marketing was not a concern for railways since their clients were for the most part assigned to them by a central planning agency. To increase revenues after the dissolution of the Union, railways had either to find more clients or to increase tariffs.

=== Rail prominence and decline ===
The new railways faced difficulties adopting monolithic organizations with large social welfare burdens and aging equipment.

1. The Kyrgyz Republic and Tajikistan started national railways from scratch as they were left with only branches of Soviet companies.
2. The railways changed from a command economy in which the only client was the state to a market economy with many clients, each with its own requirements and free to choose another, more suitable transport mode.
3. Networks were not designed with a national economy in mind and were poorly connected often necessitating crossing borders to travel between regions of a country.
4. There was a sharp fall in traffic volume, which has started picking up since 1999.

In the CIS, an inter-governmental agreement was signed as early as 14 February 1992. This organization coordinates the operations and development of the railways and has facilitated several important agreements on tariffs.

Regional traffic in Central Asia is overwhelmingly carried by rail, estimated at 90%. For trade within Central Asia, roadways carry only 22% of all goods. The Kazak railway, via Kzyl-Orda and Aralsk, has traditionally provided the main connection between Uzbekistan and the Kyrgyz Republic and between European Russia and Northern Europe and now provides a route to the Caspian Sea port of Aktau. The railway in Uzbekistan via Navoi and Nukus and then through Makat in Kazakhstan provides a link between southern Uzbekistan, Turkmenistan, and Tajikistan to western Siberia. It also provides an alternative east-west link to the Kzyl-Orda-Aralsk route via Aktau.

In the 1990s a sharp decrease in traffic led to a period of large surpluses when only the best wagons were used. Many of the worst were either scrapped or cannibalized to maintain the others. At the time of independence, the number of freight wagons in Kazakhstan was estimated to be 128,000. In 2001, the number was down to 78,000. Of those, at least 30% and probably more were out of service. About 43% of the remaining wagons were over 20 years old.

=== Rail Border Concerns ===
The Soviet Union built rail lines that stop at the former Soviet boundary. Thus, out of five Central Asian countries, only Kazakhstan (with China at Dostyk/Druzhba-Alashankou) and Turkmenistan (with Iran at Serakhs) have rail connections beyond the CIS. The railways connect northern Kazakhstan with Russia along the northern Trans-Asian Railway (TAR). Initially planned in 1954, construction began in the 1950s but was not completed until 1990. Freight trains began running in July 1991, followed by passenger trains linking Almaty and Ürümqi (in Xinjiang) in June 1992.

The Serakhs station that links the Russian gauge Turkmen network to the standard gauge Iranian network opened in 1996 for transit - to Iran and Turkey. This line connects to the Iranian railway system but it does not carry freight to the Persian Gulf, thus preventing a direct link between Central Asia and seafaring routes.

Thus, numerous underlying cross-border problems are at the root of the difficulties of regional rail transport. A lack of track-sharing agreements means that a single operator moving goods through two or more countries is not feasible. This causes time-consuming and costly border operations - trains have to change locomotives and crews at each border crossing. There is no system of sealing wagons (like under the TIR Convention) to avoid the need for customs inspections at borders or within transit countries.

There is also a lack of regional uniform customs and other border controls that comply with international best practices, which makes documentation delays much more likely. Cargo documentation is often complicated with separate weigh bills for each country traversed; any documentation problem can result in the wagon being detained for several days.

"The aging of the locomotive fleet does not imply a shortage in the short-term; the problem is rather obsolescence."

== Road Transportation ==
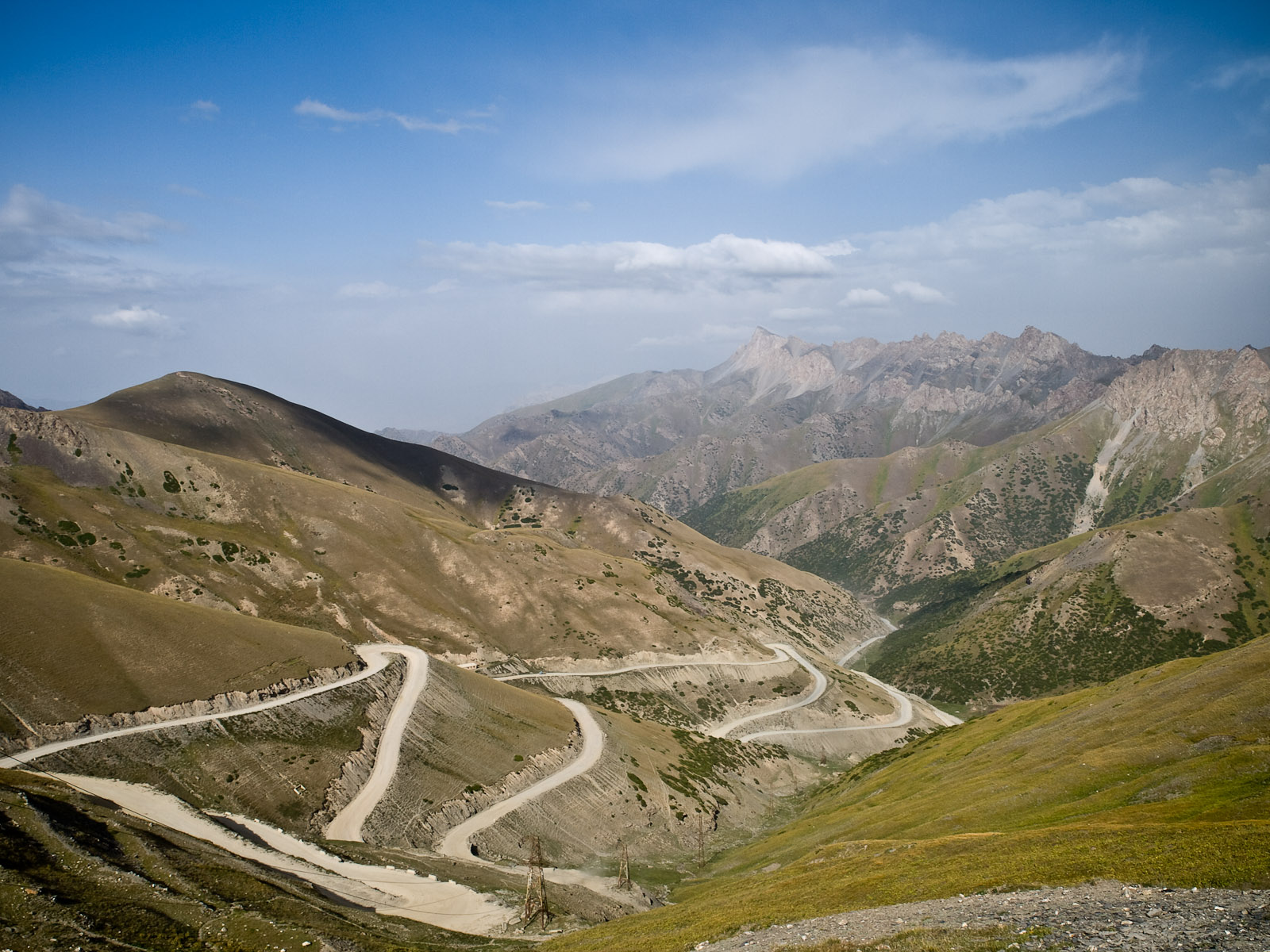
Taldyk pass (3600 m)

The relatively small populations, large land areas (particularly in Kazakhstan, Turkmenistan and Uzbekistan) and difficult mountainous terrain (especially in the Kyrgyz Republic and Tajikistan) increase infrastructure costs and pose challenges to maintenance of road infrastructure in Central Asia. The total road length under central government management (roads considered national highway) in Central Asia is 59,430 km, almost all of which is paved. There are significant seasonal variations in road use due to the transportation of fresh agricultural products. Almost all food products are carried by road transport from south to north, particularly during the warmer months.

=== Soviet Road Building ===
In the USSR, five technical categories of highways existed, depending on the relation of the highway to the country's total transportation system and on the estimated traffic. The higher the estimated traffic, the higher the category of road (150 km/h for Category 1 down to 60 km/h for Category 5).

The Soviet highways were differentiated into:

- All-Union highways: provided interrepublic transportation and connected capitals of the republics with each other and major economic centers. They also serve international transportation lines, airports, and health resorts of all-Union significance.
- Republic highways: provided transportation between oblasts and connected railroad stations and harbors as well as providing access to all-Union highways.
- Oblast highways: connected oblast centers with cities and important industrial and agricultural centers.
- Local highways: provided transportation between raion centers and connected to outlying settlements, sovkhozes and kolhozes.
- Department highways: highways under the jurisdiction of individual ministries (such as forestry, metallurgy, etc.).

In Central Asia, the major highways which were built include:

- Alma-Ata - Frunze - Tashkent (812 km): This highway was built from 1957 to 1965. It was the chief highway of southern Kazakhstan, passing through Dzhambul and Shimkent.
- Tashkent - Termez (708 km): Built in 1940 with substantial reconstruction in the 1960s. This highway was called the Lenin Road. It passed through Guliston and Samarkand. Together with the aforementioned highway, it formed USSR Route 36.
- Frunze - Osh (605 km): Built from 1956 to 1965 this was the main highway of the Kyrgyz Republic connecting the northern and southern oblasts of the republic.

On this highway, the largest highway tunnel in the USSR was built at an altitude of 3,200 meters stretching 2.5 km long.

- Osh - Khorog (701 km): Called the Pamir Road, this highway was built from 1931 to 1934. This route allowed transport to the Gorno-Altai Autonomous Oblast. Together with the aforementioned highway this route formed USSR Route 37. Some stretches of the route are at elevations above 4,000 meters, including the Taldy Pass (see photo).

=== Soviet road publications ===
Automotive Roads (Avtomobil'nye Dorogi) was a monthly industrial and technical magazine published by the Ministry of Transport Construction. It was published in Moscow beginning in 1954, dealing with questions of planning, building, repairing and maintaining highways.

Automotive Transport (Avotmobil'nyi Transport) was a monthly manufacturing and technical publication published by the Ministry of Motor Vehicle Transportation and Highways and the Central Committee of the Trade Union of Employees of Motor Vehicle Transportation and Highways. Published in Moscow starting in 1923, it highlighted problems in organization shipments and vehicular transportation, design and repair of vehicles, training of employees and traffic safety, along with transportation abroad.

=== Modern Road Infrastructure ===
In particular, Kyrgyzstan and Tajikistan are landlocked and heavily dependent on roads for trade and commerce. Their mountainous terrain makes transportation challenging and expensive."When it comes to the main road corridors, both governments plan to continue relying on big international and bilateral partners for aid in transportation construction. In Kyrgyzstan international organisations have invested over $400 million to rehabilitate 1,600km of roads between 1995 and 2008. China's Export Import Bank is the largest investor in the transportation infrastructure of Tajikistan…" In Tajikistan, Japan's development agency is building a road south from the capital. Typically, these investments are scattershot and targeted towards road infrastructure that can potentially carry international cargo. Following the Soviet legacy, they are also typically oriented along the north-south axis. The north-south road through eastern Kazakhstan (via Almaty and Aktogay) provides an important link between the Kyrgyz Republic (and Uzbekistan to a lesser extent) and eastern Siberia. The north-south road through Kyrgyz Republic and Tajikistan, links Kazakhstan and Xinjiang to Afghanistan and ports in Iran and Pakistan.

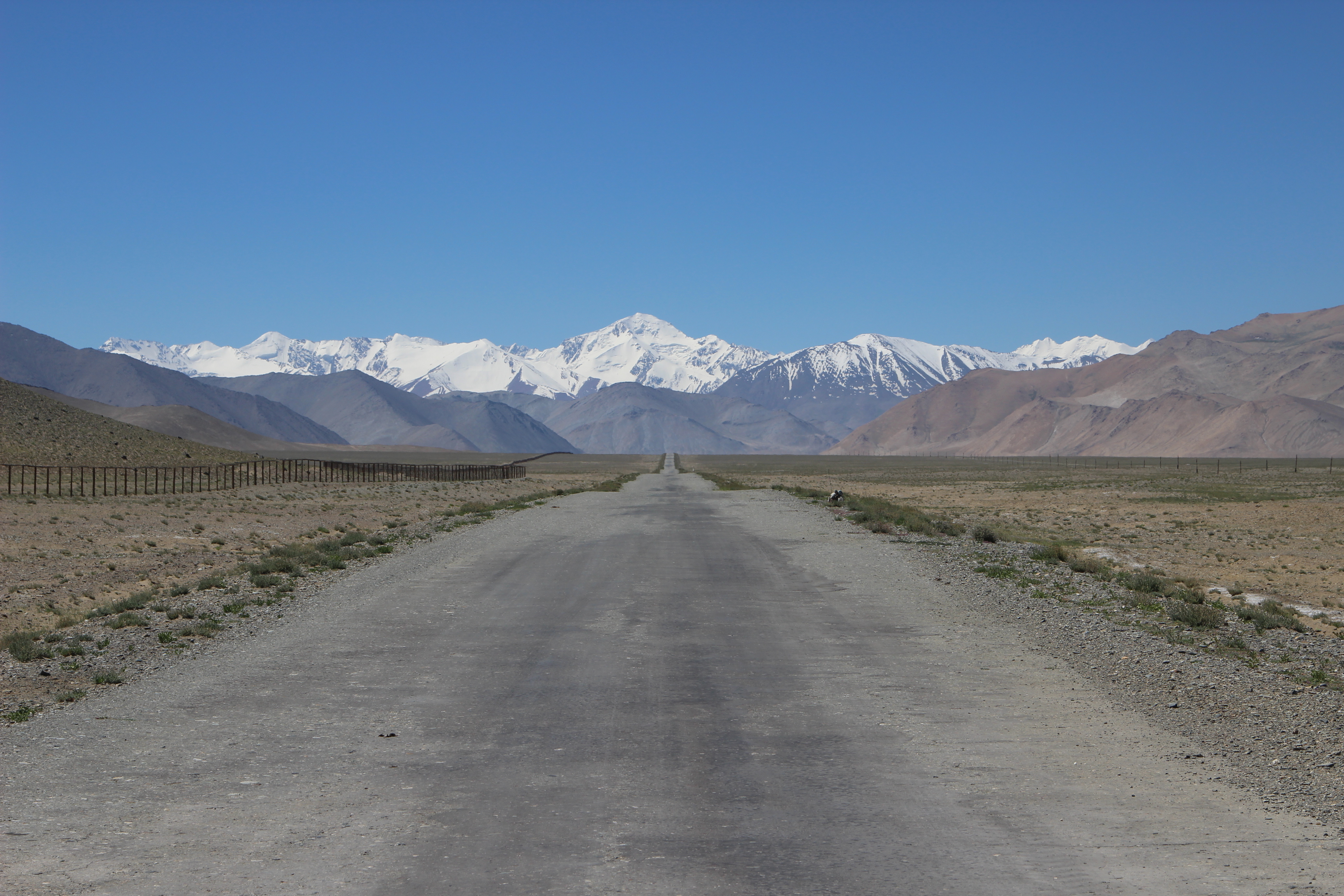
Pamir highway near Karakul

In Turkmenistan, which does not receive as much foreign aid but has substantial natural gas reserves, the Soviet system of management has largely remained in place. Five separate ministries are in charge of specific segments of the transportation sector. The government has not developed any master plan on road improvements, so upgrades do not take into account traffic volume, future building or maintenance costs.

Poor road conditions are caused by overloading vehicles and a lack of preventive maintenance, due to funding constraints. Much maintenance and repair is dependent on bilateral aid or is done piecemeal.

=== International Road Linkages ===
All Central Asian Republics are members of the International Road Union, which assists with implementation of international road transport agreements. In general, China does not participate in these broad multilateral agreements; however, it has made smaller-scale agreements. Most notable among those are the Transit Transport Agreement (PRC, Kazakhstan, Kyrgyz Republic, and Pakistan on March 9, 1995) and the Agreement on International Road Transport (PRC, Kyrgyz Republic, and Uzbekistan on 19 February 1998).

== Energy Infrastructure ==
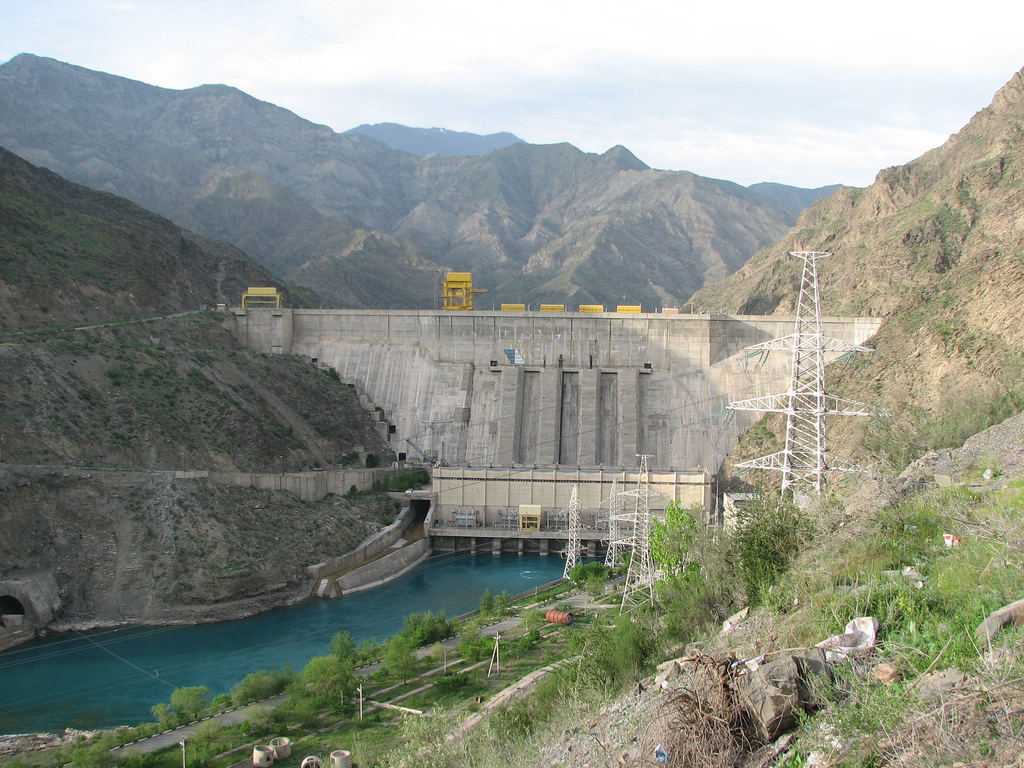
Kurpsai Hydroelectric Station, Kyrgyzstan

In the Soviet era, the United Energy System of Central Asia (UESCA) provided for the exchange of water and energy between the five Central Asian states. When the Soviet Union collapsed, these countries quickly discovered that their new, disconnected grids had significant gaps. Under the arrangement prevalent during the Soviet Union, Kyrgyzstan and Tajikistan would supply water for irrigation purposes to Uzbekistan, Kazakhstan and Turkmenistan in summer. In winter Turkmenistan, Kazakhstan and Uzbekistan would supply gas to Tajikistan and Kyrgyzstan to cover their heating needs. UESCA began falling apart in 2003 when Turkmenistan declared its exit from the system. With the disintegration of Soviet-era sharing agreements, Tajikistan and Kyrgyzstan are facing drastic shortages in power supply. The winter shortage in Tajikistan is 500 MW.

=== Hydroelectric Power ===
Until the 1950s, the USSR focused its hydroelectric construction in the European part of the Union, which was responsible for 65% of the hydroelectrical output of the USSR. In subsequent decades, significant construction was taken up in the Volga, Far East and Central Asian rivers.

The Toktogul Hydroelectric Power Plant is located on the Naryn River in Osh oblast. The plant began operating in 1975 with 1,200 Megawatts capacity. It has a dam that is 215 meters high. The dam forms the Toktogul Reservoir which began filling in 1974. The reservoir covers 284 square km. The reservoir regulates the flow of the Naryn River, allowing for the irrigation of 0.5 million hectares of land.

Construction of the Nurek Hydroelectric Power Plant began on the Vahsh River near Nurek, Tadzhik SSR in 1961. The dam is 300m high, with a volume of 56 million cubic meters. Electric power from the dam supplied the unified power grid of Central Asia through transmission lines operating at 500 and 220 kilovolts. The planned capacity was 2,700 Megawatts. The reservoir formed by the dam began filling in 1972, with an area of 98 square kilometers. It provided seasonal regulation of water flow and made possible the irrigation of 1 million hectares of land in the Karshi and Kzyl-Kum steppes and the Dangara Plateau.

The Bukhtarma Hydroelectric Power Plant is located on the Irtysh River in Kazakhstan. It had an established capacity of 675 megawatts, with construction beginning in 1953, operating at full capacity in 1966. The dam height is 80 meters, forming the Bukhtarma Reservoir and providing electricity to east Kazakhstan. The reservoir began filling in 1960 with an area of 5,500 square km. It allows for irrigation of hundreds of thousands of acres of floodplains in several oblasts.

The USSR built some of the highest dams in the world, with Nurek as the highest. Hydroelectric projects were also carried out in highly seismic regions (of which the Toktogul dam is a "9-point region").

=== Modern Strains on Soviet Energy Infrastructure ===
Uzbekistan and Turkmenistan have been living off the energy generating capacity built in the 1960s and 1970s, but this infrastructure is reaching its limits. Although there is no shortage of power in Kyrgyzstan yet, demand is growing. The government allowed two thermal plants in Osh and Bishkek to deteriorate to the extent that now produces power shortages in winter.

In Tajikistan the energy sector is used to support two key export industries – cotton and aluminium production. The ministry of water and irrigation is one of the largest debtors to Barki Tajik, the national electricity company. The Tajik Aluminium Company consumes between 40 and 50 per cent of all electricity and pays the lowest tariff in the country. The government argues that both sectors are crucial sources of revenue. After gaining independence in 1991 Kazakhstan moved to address strategic vulnerabilities of the energy system. At the time the northern part of the country was linked with the Russian grid, while southern regions draw their supply from the unified regional system. By building two north-south transmission lines (one in 1997 and the other in 2009) the country connected its southern territories to major sources of energy in the north and decreased dependence on its neighbours.

In the Kyrgyz Republic, the gate price of heating oil is $50 per ton at the refinery in the south of the country. Bringing it to the north by rail, however, may cost as much as $27–30 because it must pass through Uzbekistan, Tajikistan, and Kazakhstan. That means oil will sell for about $90 in the north. For coal, the share of transport costs in the final price is even higher.

== Sources ==
- Central Asia: Decay and Decline. International Crisis Group (3 February 2011). Retrieved 17 April 2013.
- Otsuka, Shigeru (2001). "Central Asian Railways and Europe-Asia Land Bridge". Japan Railway and Transport Review. Volume 28
- Prakash, Manohan. "Connecting Central Asia A Road Map for Regional Cooperation". Asian Development Bank. Retrieved 17 April 2013.
- Prokhorov, A.M. (ed.) (1970) Great Soviet Encyclopedia (English translation) (3rd ed.) New York: Macmillan Inc.
- Prokhorov, A.M. (ed.) (1973) Great Soviet Encyclopedia (English translation) (3rd ed.) New York: Macmillan Inc.
- Prokhorov, A.M. (ed.) (1974) Great Soviet Encyclopedia (English translation) (3rd ed.) New York: Macmillan Inc.
- Prokhorov, A.M. (ed.) (1975) Great Soviet Encyclopedia (English translation) (3rd ed.) New York: Macmillan Inc.
- Prokhorov, A.M. (ed.) (1976) Great Soviet Encyclopedia (English translation) (3rd ed.) New York: Macmillan Inc.
- Prokhorov, A.M. (ed.) (1977) Great Soviet Encyclopedia (English translation) (3rd ed.) New York: Macmillan Inc.
- Prokhorov, A.M. (ed.) (1978) Great Soviet Encyclopedia (English translation) (3rd ed.) New York: Macmillan Inc.
- RIDA (Research Institute Of Development Assistance) (1998): Regional cooperation in Central Asia : focusing on infrastructure development. OECF
