= A164 highway (Russia) =

Federal highway in Russia

Federal Highway A164
- Федеральная автомобильная дорога А164
- Transkam Highway

Route information
- Length: 164 km (102 mi)

Major junctions
- North end: R 217 in Kardzhin
- South end: Georgian border

Location
- Country: Russia

Highway system
- Russian Federal Highways
← A 163	→ A 165

The Russian route A164, also known as Transkam Highway, is a Russian federal highway. A164 highway is a part of Transcaucasian Highway, connecting southern Russia and Georgia. Before 2018, the route was designated R297 and R298.

== Previous route ==
The A164 designation was used on a route from Kultuk via Mondy to the Mongolian border. This route is now A333.

== Gallery ==
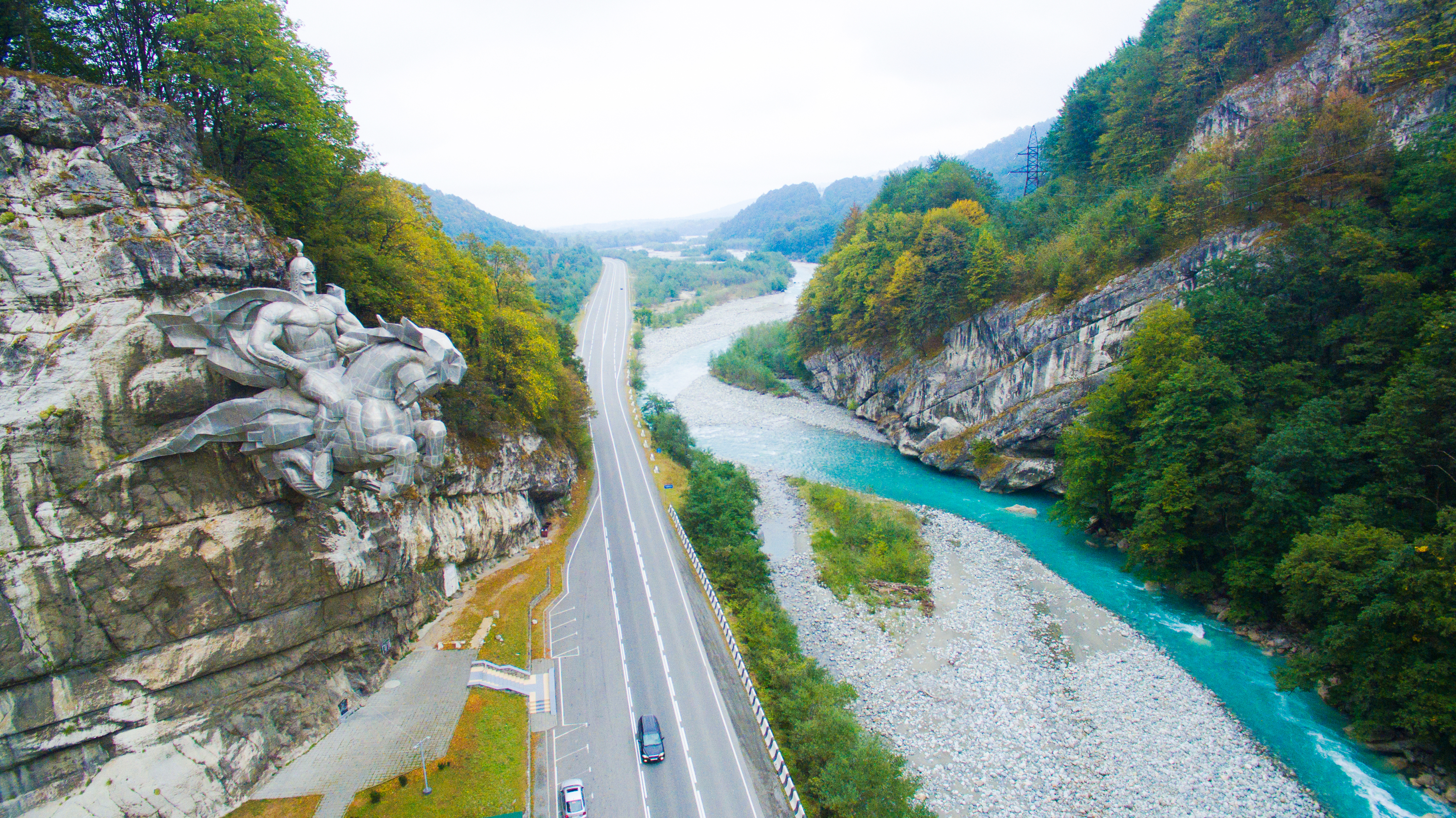
A164 highway in North Ossetia–Alania.

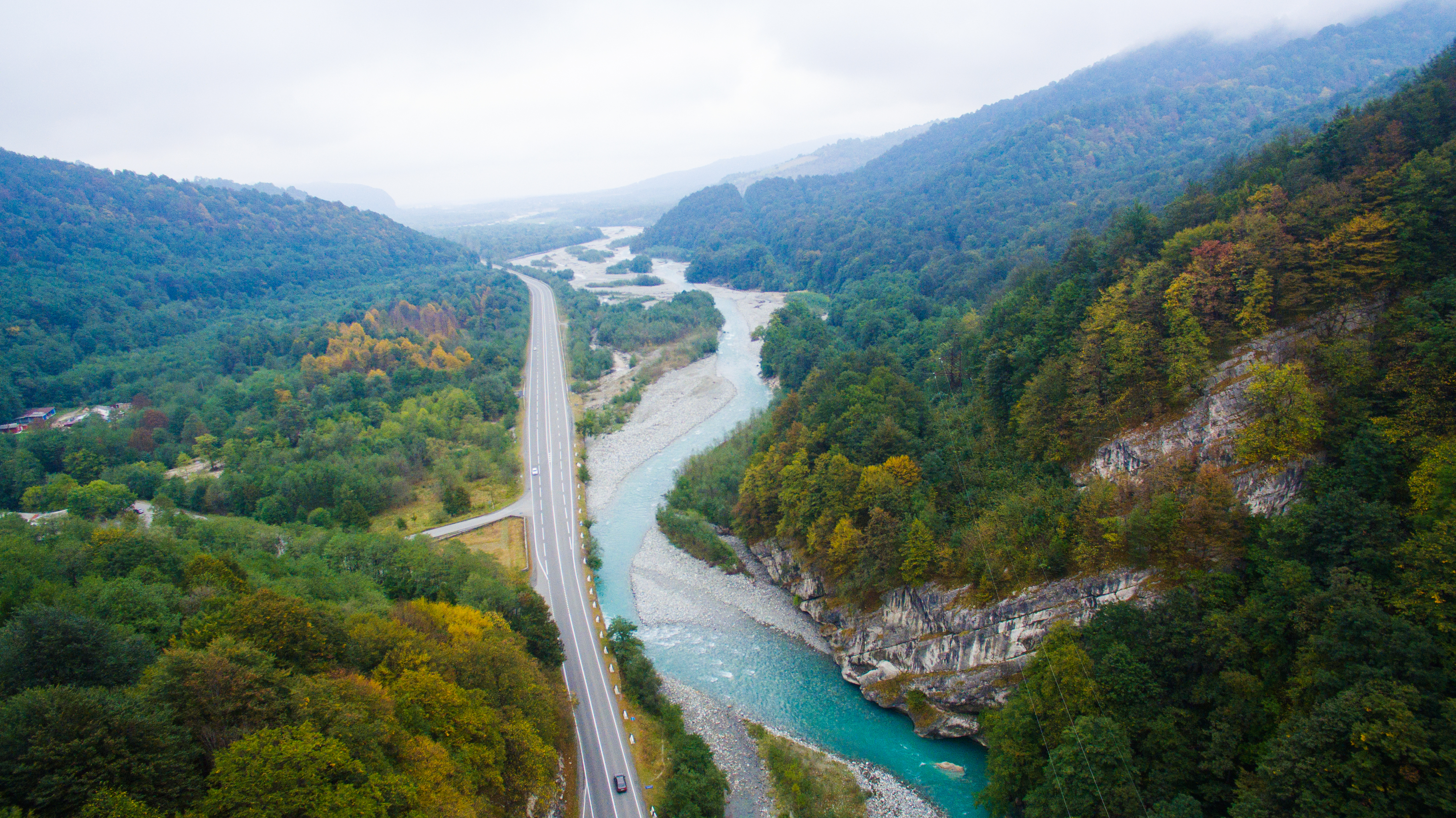
The same location.
