= Verkhni Lars =

Border crossing between Russia and Georgia

Coordinates: 42°46′07″N 44°37′52″E

Verkhny Lars (Russian: Верхний Ларс, Verkhny Lars) is a border crossing and former village in North Ossetia–Alania, Russia, located on the Georgian Military Road near the border with Georgia. It lies in the Terek River valley at the northern foot of the Greater Caucasus. It is the only border crossing between Russia and Georgia that does not cross through either South Ossetia or Abkhazia. The Verkhny Lars border crossing is located near the village, approximately 30 km south of Vladikavkaz, and forms part of the road connection between Russia and Georgia. The Georgian Military Road continues south through the Darial Gorge toward Stepantsminda and Tbilisi. The crossing is an important road link between Russia and Georgia.

The crossing was closed by Russian authorities between 2006 and 2010, who claimed that the crossing was undergoing "extensive reconstruction". Relations between Russia and Georgia were severed due to the Russo-Georgian War in 2008. In late 2009, the two countries reached an agreement to reopen the crossing, partly due to pressure from neighboring Armenia, which required the crossing in order to have access to Russia.
