= Purushottam Laxman Deshpande bibliography =

This is a list of the works by Purushottam Laxman Deshpande (1947–1999)

== Books ==
=== Humour ===
- Golabereej (गोळाबेरीज) - 1960
- AghaL-PaghaL (अघळ-पघळ) - 1998
- Marathi Vangmayacha (Galeev) Itihas (मराठी वाङ्‌मयाचा (गाळीव) इतिहास) – 1970
- Khogirbharati (खोगीरभरती) - 1950
- Hasavnuk (हसवणूक) - 1968
- Batatyachi Chaal (बटाट्याची चाळ)
- Khilli (खिल्ली) - 1984
- Asa mi Asami (असा मी असामी) - 1964
- UralaSurala (उरलंसुरलं) - 1999
- Purchundi (पुरचुंडी) – 1999

=== Travelogues ===
- Vangachitre (वंगचित्रे) – 1974
- Apoorvai (अपूर्वाई) – 1960
- Poorvarang (पूर्वरंग) -1963
- Jaave Tyanchya Desha (जावे त्यांच्या देशा) – 1974

=== Adaptations ===
- Kay Wattel Te Hoeel (काय वाट्टेल ते होईल) – 1962...translation of Helen and George Papashvily's Anything Can Happen
- Eka Koliyane (एका कोळीयाने) – 1965...translation of Ernest Hemingway's The Old Man and the Sea
- Kanhoji Angre (कान्होजी आंग्रे)(Translation of English novel "Maratha Admiral Kanhoji Angre" by Manohar Malgoankar)
- Poravay (पोरवय) –1995... translation of "Chhelebela" By Ravindranath Tagore

=== Biographies (व्यक्तिचित्रं) ===
- Gangot (गणगोत) – 1966
- Gandhiji (गांधीजी) – 1970
- Guna Gaeen Awadi (गुण गाईन आवडी) – 1975
- Maitra (मैत्र) – 1989
- Apulki (आपुलकी) – 1998

=== Collection of Speeches ===
- Rasikaho! (रसिकहो!) - 1995
- Soojanaho! (सुजनहो!) -2002
- Mitra Ho! (मित्र हो!) - 1995
- Shrote Ho! (श्रोते हो!) -1996
- Speeches on radio and radio-plays - Parts 1 and 2 (रेडियोवरील भाषणे व श्रुतिका - भाग एक व दोन) - 2001

=== Humorous essays ===
- Gacchi saha Zalich Pahije (गच्ची सह झालीच पाहिजे)
- Eka Raviwarchi Sakaal (एका रविवारची सकाळ)
- Maze Shahari Jeevan (माझे शहरी जीवन)
- Bigari Te Matric (बिगरी ते मॅट्रिक) - Hasavnuk (हसवणूक)
- Mumbaikar, Punekar Ka Nagpurkar? (मुंबईकर, पुणेकर का नागपूरकर?)
- Mhais (म्हैस) - Golabereej (गोळाबेरीज)
- Mi Ani Majha Shatrupaksha (मी आणि माझा शत्रुपक्ष) - Hasavnuk (हसवणूक)
- Paliv Pranee (पाळीव प्राणी) - Hasavnuk (हसवणूक)
- Kahi Nave Grahayog (काही नवे ग्रहयोग)
- Majhe Poshtik Jeewan (माझे पोष्टिक जीवन) - Hasavnuk (हसवणूक)

=== Other ===
- Vyakti Ani Valli (व्यक्ती आणि वल्ली) – 1962
- Ek Shunya Mee (एक शून्य मी) - 2001
- Chitramay Swagat (चित्रमय स्वगत) - 1996
- Pu. La. : Ek Sathawan (पु. ल : एक साठवण) – 1979
- Daad (दाद) - 1997
- Dwidal (द्विदल) - 2004
- Char Shabd (चार शब्द) - 1996
- Mukkam Shantiniketan (मुक्काम शांतिनिकेतन) - 2001
- Ravindranath : Teen Vyakhyane (रवीन्द्रनाथ : तीन व्याख्याने) - 1981
- Telephone-cha Janma (टेलिफोनचा जन्म)
- Kolhapur Darshan (Shriman Madan Mohan Lohiya Shashtyabdipurti nimitta abhinandan grantha) - 1971. Co-authored with Madanmohan Basantilal Lohia and Ganesh Rango Bhide.

== Drama ==
- Tuka Mhane Ata (तुका म्हणे आता) – 1948
- Pudhari Pahije (पुढारी पाहिजॆ) – 1951
- Ammaldar (अंमलदार) – 1952...based on Nikolai Gogol's Inspector General
- Bhagyawan (भाग्यवान) – 1953
- Tujhe Ahe Tujhapashi (तुझें आहे तुजपाशीं) – 1957
- Sundar Mi Honar (सुंदर मी होणार) – 1958
- Pahila Raja/adhe Adhure (पहिला राजा/आधे अधूरे) – 1976...based on Jagadish Chandra Mathur's Adhe Adhure
- Teen Paishancha Tamasha (तीन पैशांचा तमाशा) – 1978...based on Bertolt Brecht's The Three Penny Opera
- Ti Fulrani (ती फुलराणी) – 1975...based on George Bernard Shaw's Pygmalion
- Varyavarchi Varaat (वाऱ्यावरची वरात)
- Eka Jhunja Varyashi (एक झुंज वाऱ्याशीं) -1988... based on "The Last Appointment" By Vladin Dozortsev
- Vatvat Vatvat (वटवट वटवट) -1971

=== One-act plays ===
- Mothe Mase Aani Chhote Mase (मोठे मासे आणि छोटे मासे) – 1957
- Vitthal To Aala Aala (विठ्ठल तो आला आला) – 1961
- Aamhi Latike Na Bolu (आम्ही लटिके ना बोलू) – 1975
- Nasti Uthathev (नस्ती उठाठेव) - 1952

=== One-man stage shows ===
- Batatyachi Chaal (बटाट्याची चाळ) - 1958
- Asa Mi Asami (असा मी असामी)
- Hasawinyacha Majha Dhanda (हसविण्याचा माझा धंदा)
- Varyawarachi Varaat (वा-यावरची वरात) – A large part of this play is one man show.

=== Children's plays ===
- Vay Motha Khota (वयं मोठं खोटं) – 1956
- Nave Gokul (नवे गोकुळ) – 1958
