= Kobiaantkari =

Kobiaantkari აბანოსხევი
- Location in Georgia Kobiaantkari (Georgia)
- Coordinates: 42°04′25″N 44°41′15″E
- Country: Georgia
- Region: Mtskheta-Mtianeti
- Municipality: Dusheti
- Elevation: 580 m (1,900 ft)

Population (2014)
  - Total: 399
- Time zone: UTC+4 (Georgian Time)

Kobiaantkari (Georgian: კობიაანთკარი) is a village in Georgia, situated in the Dusheti Municipality, Mtskheta-Mtianeti region, in about 1 km south from town Dusheti.

Name of the village is derived from surname "Kobiashvili" and Georgian word "kari" (means "household" ). Originally this village was landed property of Kobiashvili family.

== Notable people ==
- George Papashvily - a famous Georgian-American writer and sculptor

== See also ==
- Dusheti Municipality
- Dusheti
- Mtskheta-Mtianeti
