= Abanoskhevi =

Abanoskhevi აბანოსხევი
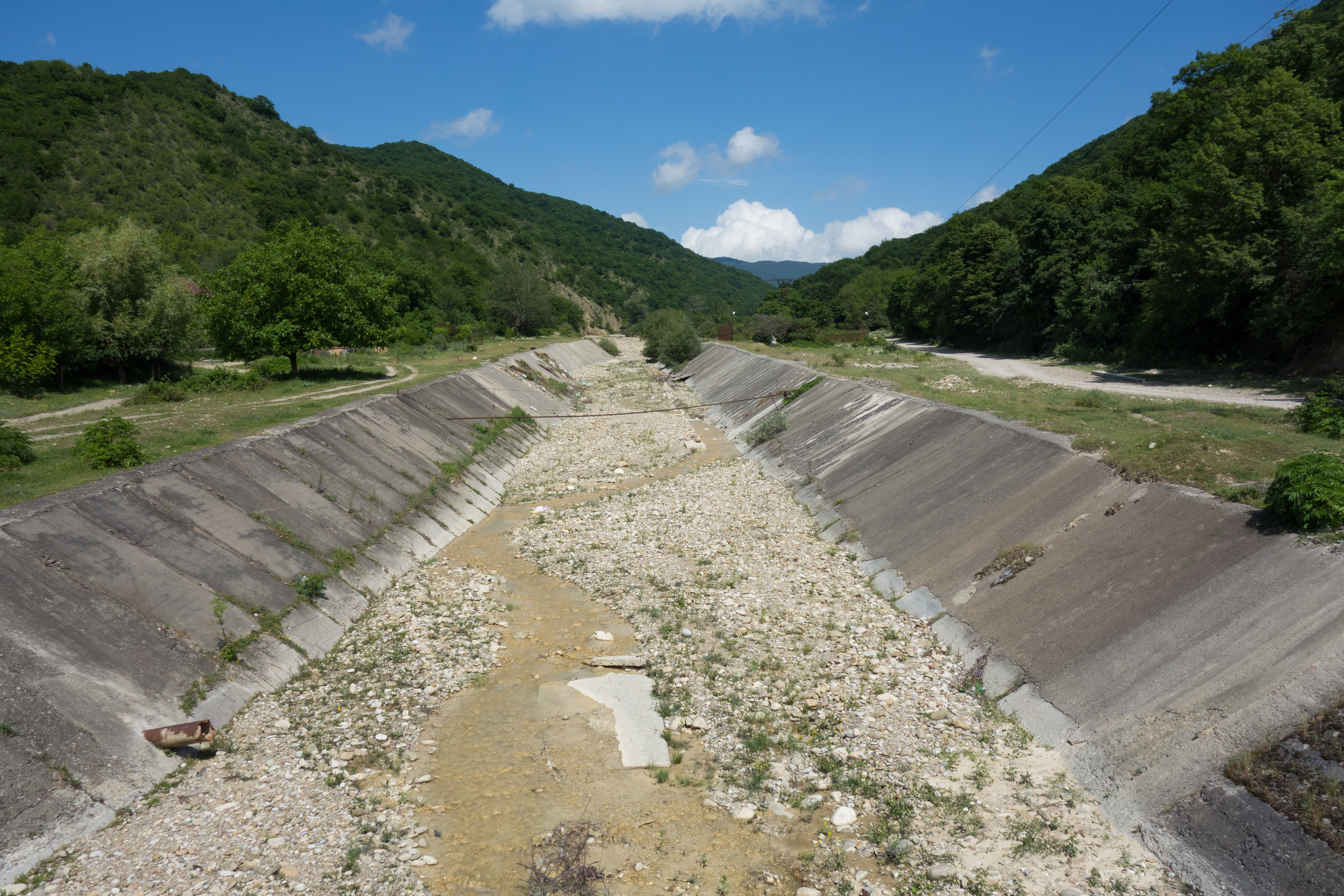
- River Abanoskhevi

- Location in Georgia Abanoskhevi (Georgia)
- Coordinates: 42°1′35″N 44°45′53″E
- Country: Georgia
- Region: Mtskheta-Mtianeti
- Municipality: Dusheti
- Elevation: 580 m (1,900 ft)

Population (2014)
  - Total: 399
- Time zone: UTC+4 (Georgian Time)

Abanoskhevi (Georgian: აბანოსხევი) is a village in Mtskheta-Mtianeti region, Georgia. It is part of the Lapanaantkari commune, Dusheti municipality, with a population of 399, mostly (99%) ethnic Georgians, as of the 2014 census.

Abanoskhevi is located on both banks of the Abanoskhevi river, a left tributary of the Aragvi, at 580 meters above sea level, 13 km southeast of the town of Dusheti.

The earliest archaeologically-confirmed traces of human habitation in the area date to the Neolithic era, c. 4,000 BC.
