= Bodorna =

Bodorna ბოდორნა
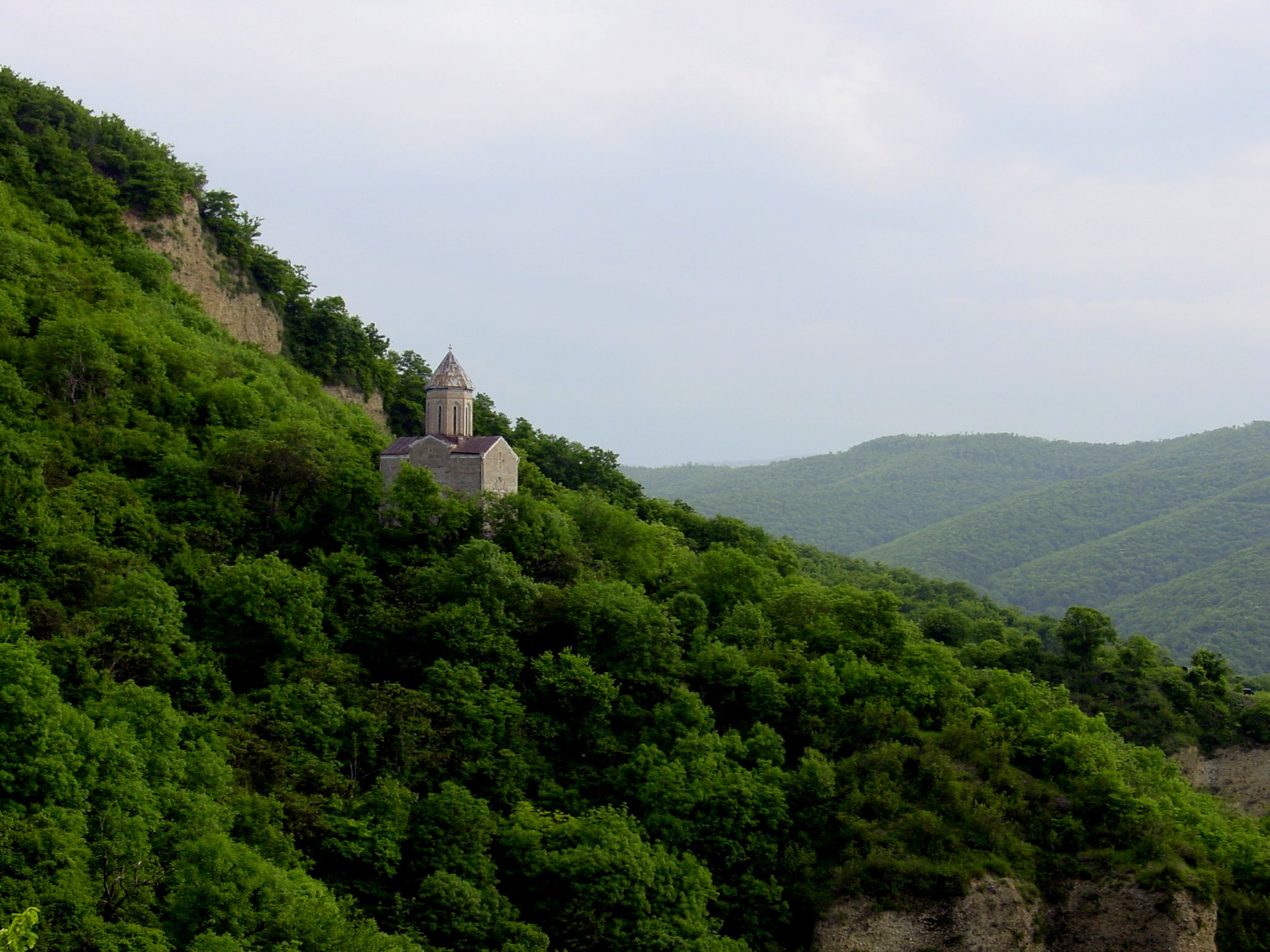

- Location in Georgia Bodorna (Georgia)
- Coordinates: 42°3′19.67″N 44°44′35″E
- Country: Georgia
- Region: Mtskheta-Mtianeti
- Municipality: Dusheti
- Elevation: 880 m (2,890 ft)

Population (2014)
  - Total: 140
- Time zone: UTC+4 (Georgian Time)

Bodorna (Georgian: ბოდორნა) is a small village in Georgia, situated on the S3 highway (Georgia) originally the Georgian Military Road, 8 km from the town of Dusheti, Mtskheta-Mtianeti region, in the east of the country.

Bodorna lies on the right bank of the small river Dushetis-Khevi, a right tributary to the Aragvi River, at an elevation of 880 m. above sea level. The village was fortified in the Middle Ages in a way to accommodate the fugitives from nearby locales during foreign incursions. Thus, the man-hewn caves at Bodorna are known to have served as a shelter for the populace of the Aragvi valley when the Turco-Mongol army of Timur penetrated the Georgian highlands in the 1390s.

South of the village is a 15 m. high column whose origin is not completely clear. It resembles a human figure, that of a monk, and may be a man-made structure, hewed from a natural, denudational relict, for cult purposes in the early Christian period, possibly the 5th-6th centuries. The column contains a large cave, one of those that were utilized as a shelter during Timur's invasion. According to a medieval chronicle, the soldiers of Timur descended the column using ropes and shoot fiery arrows into the crowded cave.

Bodorna is a home to a 15th-century Church of the Nativity of the Mother of God, which then served as a familial abbey and a burial ground for the Dukes of Aragvi of the Shaburidze family. It was almost completely rebuild in 1717 as revealed by a contemporaneous inscription. The extant structure is a single-nave domed church erected on a woody hill (pictured).

== See also ==
- Mtskheta-Mtianeti
