= Arkhoti =

Arkhoti Valley არხოტის ხეობა
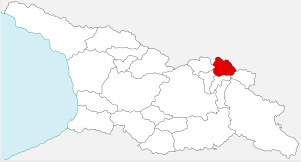

- Location within Mtskheta-Mtianeti Location within Georgia
- Coordinates: 42°38′22″N 44°52′54″E
- Country: Georgia
- Mkhare: Mtskheta-Mtianeti
- Municipality: Dusheti

Area
  - Total: 241 km^{2} (93 sq mi)
- Time zone: UTC+4 (Georgian Time)

Arkhoti Valley, Arkhvati Gorge (Georgian: არხოტის ხეობა) is a valley in Georgia, in the Dusheti municipality of the Mtskheta-Mtianeti region, inside the historical region of Khevsureti. It is one of the most isolated regions of Georgia.

== Description of the region ==
Arkhoti Valley is represented, with two villages, Akhieli and Amgha. The village Chimga on the left bank of the river Chimghistskali (Georgian: ჭიმღისწყლის) has become depopulated.

In the Arkhoti Valley there are still the remains of the following villages and towns: Kalotana (Georgian: კალოთანა), Ghorghu (Georgian: ღორღუ), Tskhsua (Georgian: წყალშუა), Kviritsminda (Georgian: კვირიწმინდა).

There are also places of the following name: Bisna (Georgian: ბისნა) in the Bisna Valley (Georgian: ბისნას ხეობაში) and Kovgra (Georgian: კოვგრა) in the Taniestskali Gorge (Georgian: ტანიესწყლის ხეობაში).

The Arkhoti Valley is a border region and is bordered by Russia to the north.

== Monuments ==
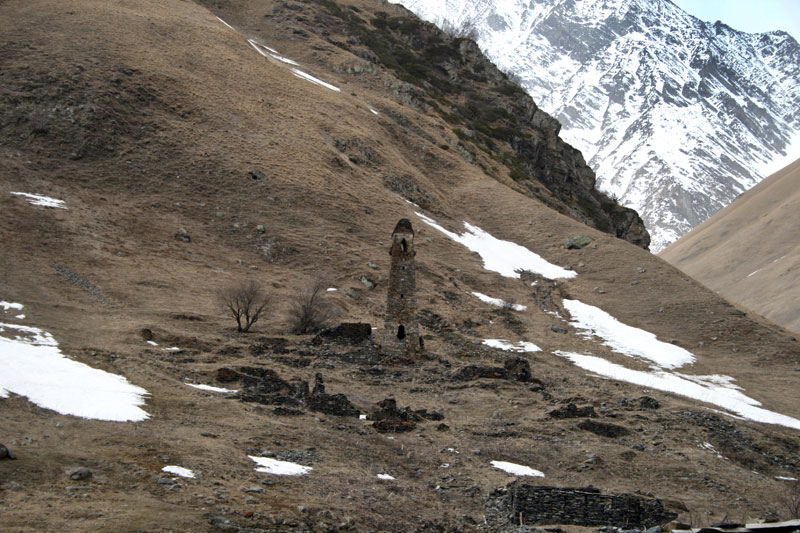
Arkhoti tower in Khevsureti, Georgia.

These are some of the cult buildings of the Arkhoti Valley: Svetiangelozisljvari, Tskalshuisjvari, Tchishvelisjvari, Arkhotisjvari, Laghi Iakhsari, Sabekuri, Rkenisjvari, Saneba Tskalsshuas Meburtvali, Sanebakaris Mezobeli, Mariamtsminda, Peter Oreti, Petre Zetukis Tsverisa, Sabalakhis Tsveri

Castles: Gagat Castle-House, Tetraulebi Tower, Kaviskari Tower, Batakat Castle-House, Kharat Castle.

== Roads ==
The main and shortest way to the neighboring Kist people is the road that follows river Assa. The distance from the remote village of the community - to the nearest settlements of Amga-Ingushetia - Pui, which the people of Arkhot call Gostikakauri, is 18-20 km.

Road construction was finished only by 2018.

== See also ==
- Khevsureti
