= Khevsureti =

Coordinates: 42.48830°N 44.87915°E

- Historical region
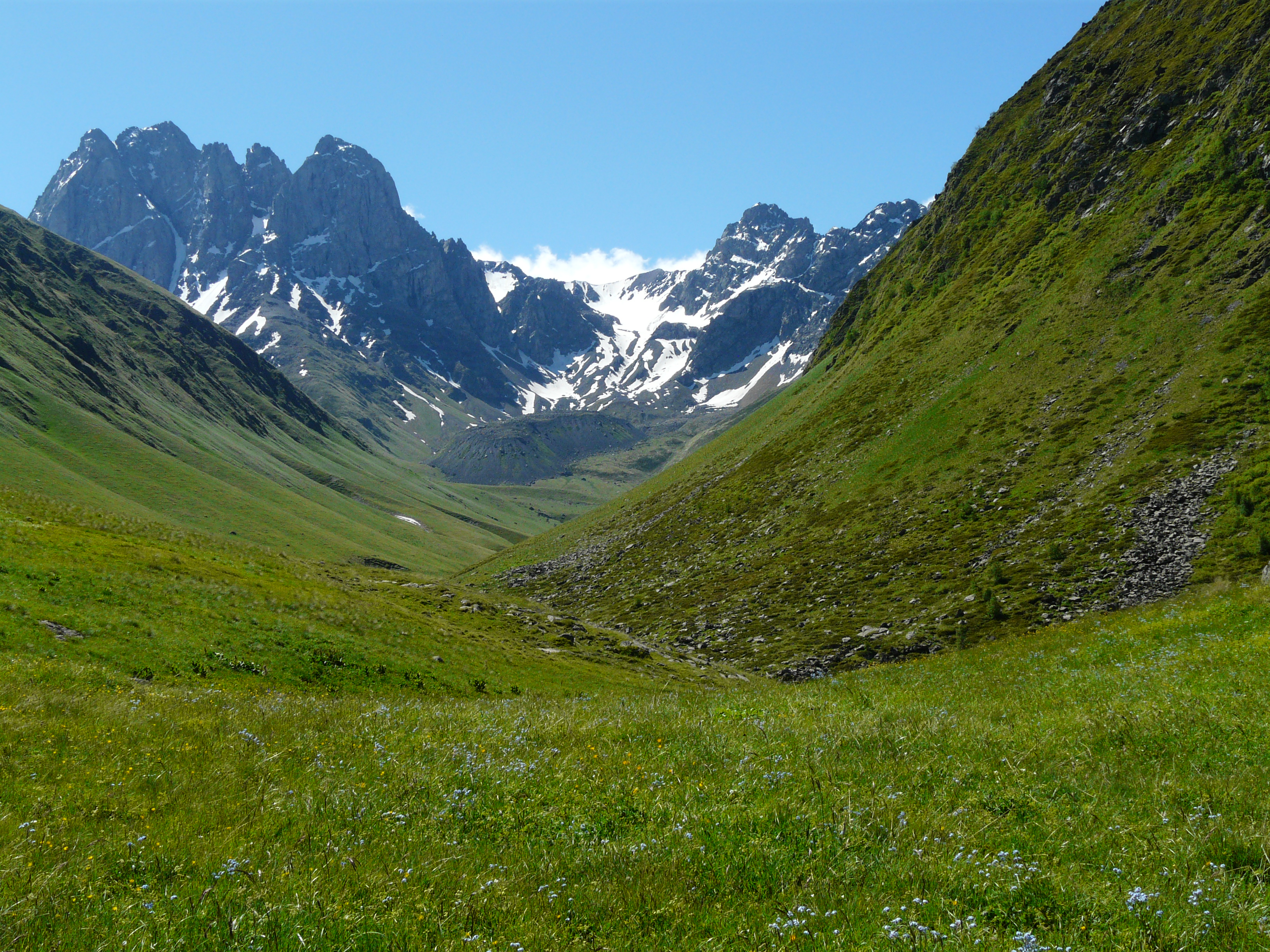

- Map highlighting the historical region of Khevsureti in Georgia
- Country: Georgia
- Mkhare: Mtskheta-Mtianeti
- Municipality: Dusheti
- Largest settlements: Shatili, Barisakho

Area
  - Total: 1,036 km^{2} (400 sq mi)

Population
  - Total: 3,200
  - Density: 3.1/km^{2} (8.0/sq mi)

Khevsureti (Georgian: ხევსურეთი) is a historical and ethnographic region in eastern Georgia. Khevsurs are the branch of Kartvelian (Georgian) people located along both the northern (Pirikita khevsureti) and southern (Piraketa khevsureti) slopes of the Great Caucasus Mountains. By the conventional definition of the Europe-Asia boundary as following the watershed of the Greater Caucasus, Khevsureti is geographically a European part of Georgia.

== Geography ==
Comprising the small river valleys of the Migmakhevi, Shatili, Arkhoti and the Aragvi, the province borders Ingushetia and Chechnya and is included in the present-day Dusheti Municipality, Mtskheta-Mtianeti region. Khevsureti, with an area of approximately 405.3 square miles (1050 km²), is traversed by the main crest of the Greater Caucasus Range, dividing the province in two unequal parts. Pirikita Khevsureti ("thither") is a larger one, with the area of c. 565 km², while Piraketa Khevsureti ("hither") occupies 428 km². The largest villages are Barisakho and Shatili.

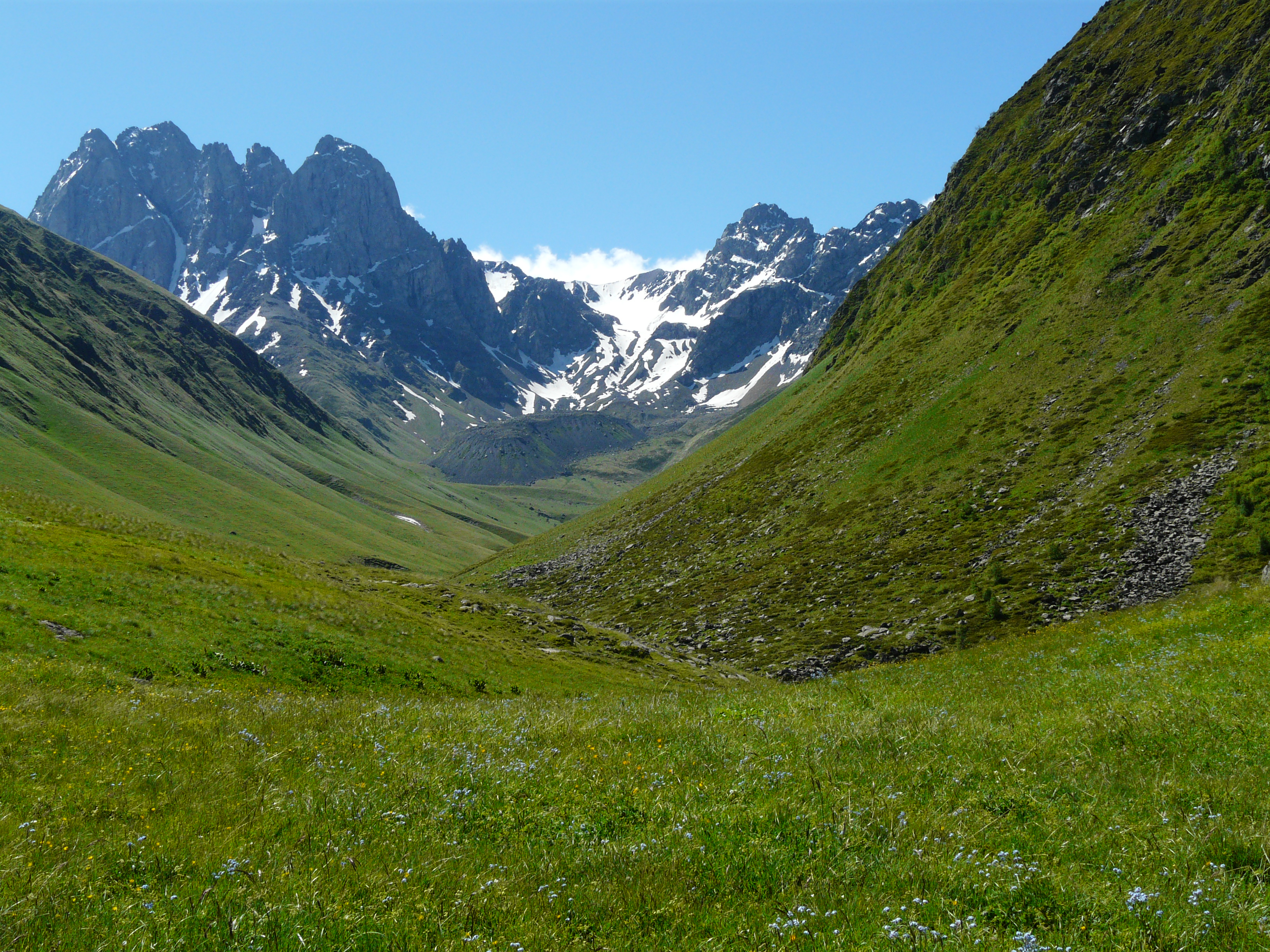
Caucasus Mountains near the village of Juta in Khevsureti.

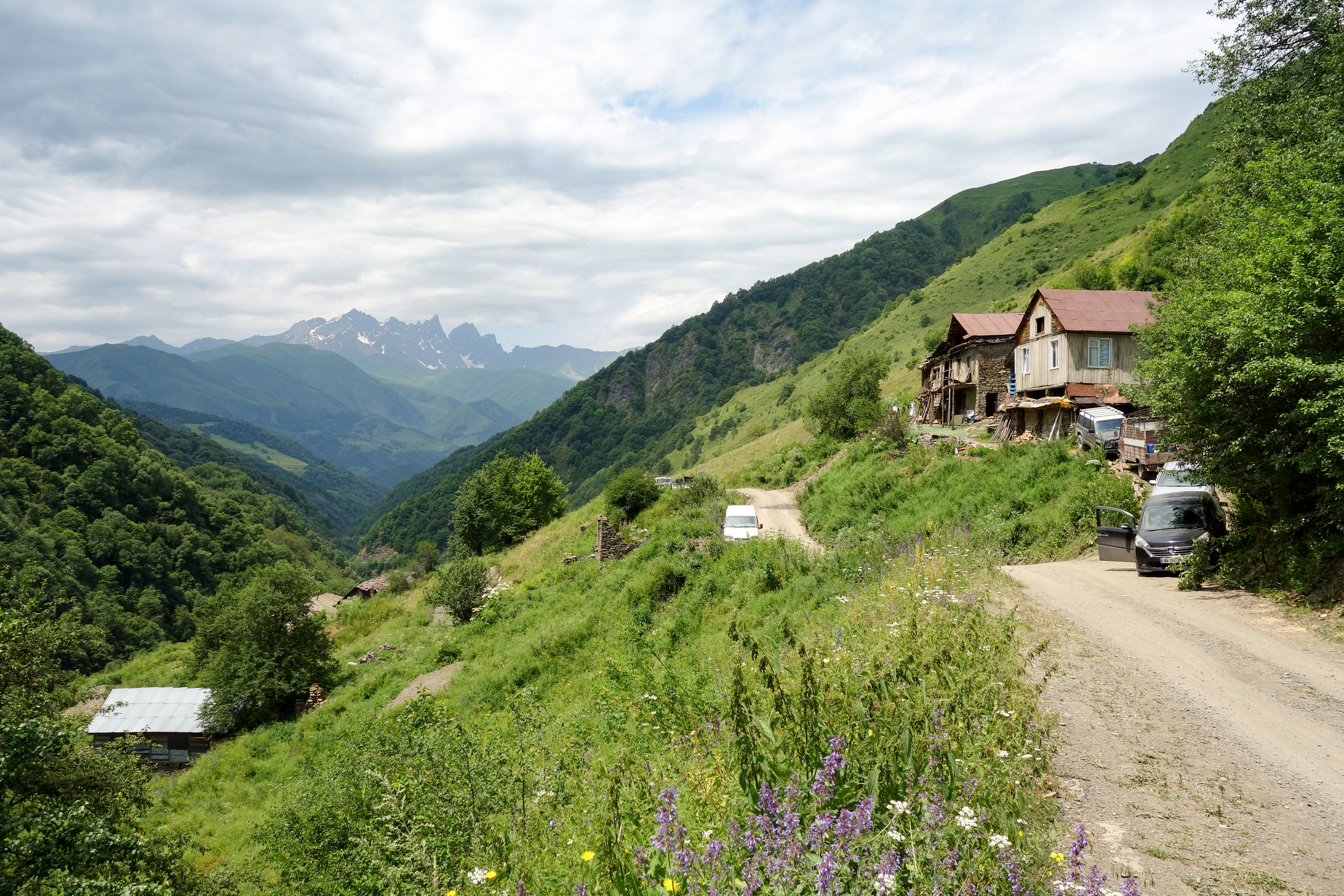
Biso, a small village in Khevsureti

== Ethnography ==
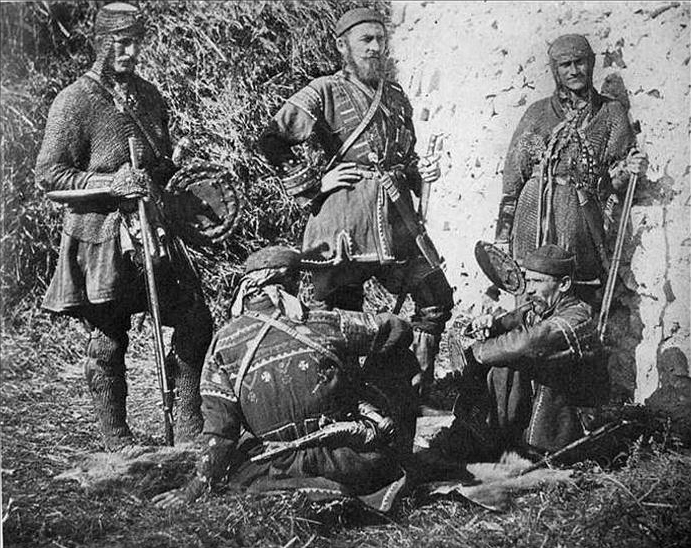
Khevsur clansmen, c. 1910

The territory of Khevsureti, together with the neighboring area of Pshavi, was known to medieval writers under the joint designation Pkhovi. Chronicler Leonti Mroveli mentions that after the conversion of the King Mirian III of Iberia and Queen Nana to Christianity in the early 4th century, St. Nino continued to preach among Georgian highlanders, including in Pkhovi.

Historically, Georgian highlander communities enjoyed a wide degree of autonomy. Residents of Khevsureti in particular never accepted local lords; they elected their leaders, known as khevisberi ('elder'), and a council of elders, who submitted themselves only to the Georgian crown. They were exceptional warriors, embodying traditional Georgian qualities of courage, openness and honesty, fraternity, independence and love of freedom, who were often promoted as royal bodyguards. Kings regarded them as reliable guardians of the Caucasus Mountains and the northern border of the kingdom. In battle, the Khevsurs wore flags adorned with crosses and considered themselves permanent members of the army of the sacred flags and guardians of Georgian Kings.

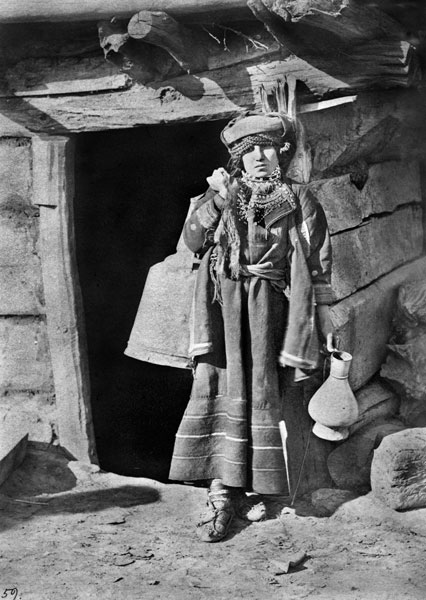
Khevsur woman. Photo by D.A. Nikitin, 1881.

A story first popularized by the Russian serviceman and ethnographer Arnold Zisserman, who spent 25 years (1842–1867) in the Caucasus, suggests that these Georgian highlanders were descendants of the last European crusaders. He claimed that their folk culture – including material, social, and religious practices – resembled that of the Crusaders. Although Zisserman claimed to have arrived at the speculation himself and is often credited with the idea, this theory had already appeared in earlier sources and was a popular story among non-Georgians in Tbilisi. The claim that any historical evidence indicates that Khevsurs may have descended from crusaders has been thoroughly discredited, and Georgian scholars have universally derided the story.

Zisserman also writes that "concerning their origin the Khevsurs have preserved a tradition: they consider a certain man by the name of Gudaneli as their first ancestor. He was a peasant vassal of a landlord in Kakheti, and to escape punishment for some crime which he had committed, he found refuge in the Pshav village of Apsho. From his two sons, Arabuli and Chinchara, originated the family of Arabuli, consisting of 320 homes, and the family of Chincharauli, with 210 homes." American traveler Richard Halliburton (1900–1939) saw and recorded the customs of the Khevsur tribe in 1935.

The Khevsur men, dressed in chain mail and armed with broadswords, wore garments full of decoration made up of crosses and icons, which they believed to be a means of protection. Greek historian Herodotus (c. 484 – c. 425 BC) notes that the Caucasian highlanders of that time were brilliant knitters and embroiders of their dress or chokha, which wore out but never faded from frequent usage. Young girls started knitting at the age of 6-7, but men studying and military training, because according to their tradition women were deprived from education and higher social status. They had a strict system of physical training in martial arts preserved as a Khridoli martial art, and which is a part of the rich Georgian military tradition.

Khevsur dances also preserved in the national dances as a warrior dance Khevsuruli.

== Religion ==
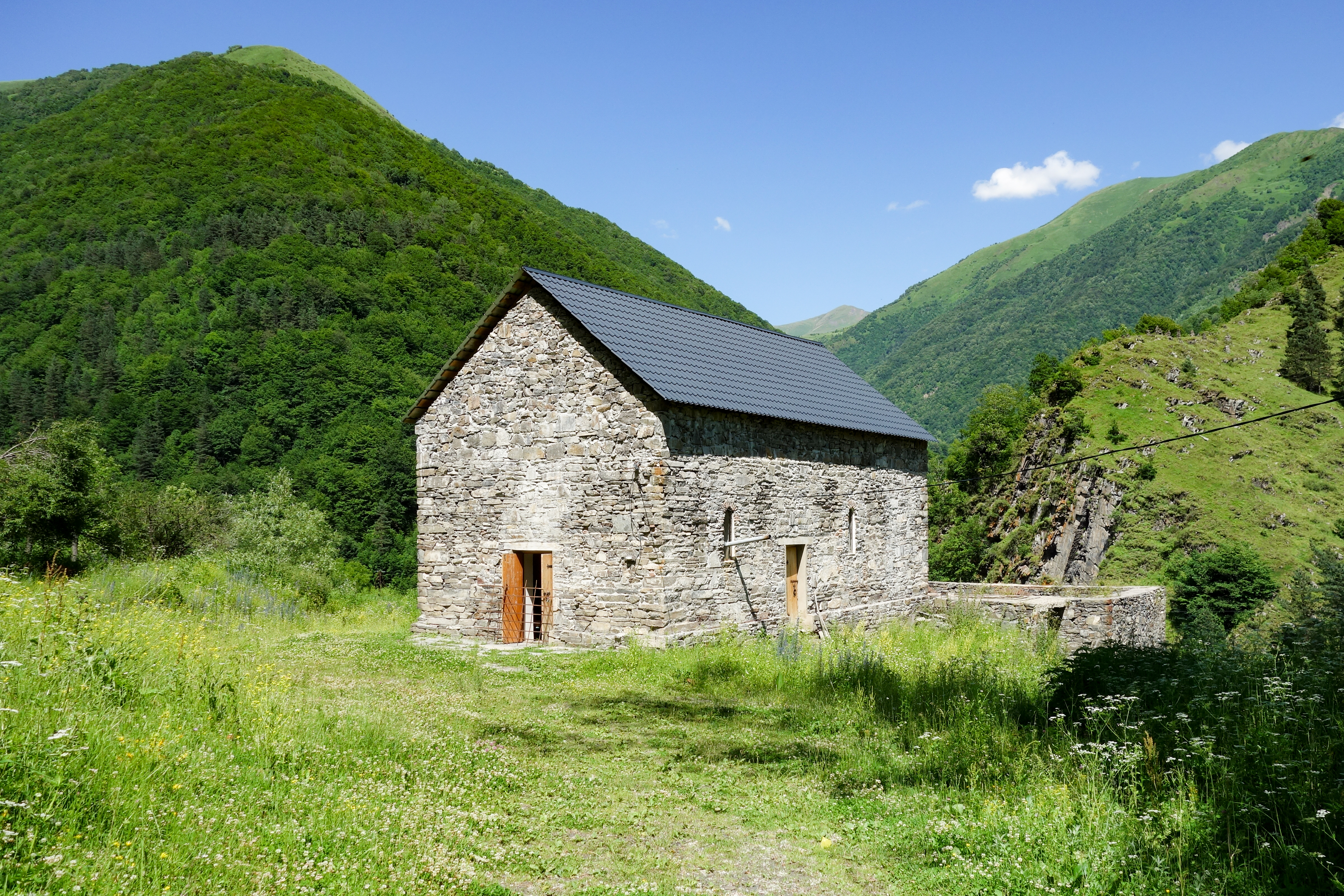
Church of Dormition in Barisakho

Their religion is a unique mixture of Georgian Orthodox Christianity and pre-Christian cults. They worship sacred places locally known as jvari ('cross'), khati ('icon') or salotsavi ('sanctuary').

== Historical population figures ==
As of the 1873 census, Khevsureti had a population of 4,872. By 1926, the population shrank to 3,885.

Figures from the Russian imperial census of 1873 given in Dr. Gustav Radde's Die Chews'uren und ihr Land (ein monographischer Versuch) untersucht im Sommer 1876 ("The Khewsurs and their country (a monographic attempt) examined in the summer of 1876") published by Cassel in 1878, divide the villages of Khevsureti into eight communities:

- the Barisakho community: 16 villages, 298 households, consisting of 723 men and 718 women, totalling 1,441 souls
- the Guli community: 8 villages, 162 households, consisting of 335 men and 356 women, totalling 691 souls
- the Roshka community: 7 villages, 145 households, consisting of 335 men and 315 women, totalling 648 souls
- the Batsaligo community: 9 villages, 131 households, consisting of 296 men and 288 women, totalling 584 souls
- the Akhieli community: 5 villages, 111 households, consisting of 273 men and 240 women, totalling 513 souls
- the Shatili community: 5 villages, 121 households, consisting of 252 men and 272 women, totalling 524 souls
- the Ardoti community: 3 villages, 86 households, consisting of 198 men and 249 women, totalling 447 souls
- the Tolaant-Sopeli community: 8 villages, 197 households, consisting of 555 men and 593 women, totalling 1,148 souls

1873 TOTAL: 61 villages, 1,251 households, consisting of 2,967 men and 3,029 women, in all 5,996 souls.

These figures can be compared with those given in Sergi Makalatia's Khevsureti (Komunistis Stamba, Tbilisi: 1935; in Georgian):

- the Barisakho community: 14 villages, 241 households, consisting of 467 men and 539 women, totalling 1,006 souls
- the Batsaligo community: 19 villages, 291 households, consisting of 547 men and 639 women, totalling 1,186 souls
- the Shatili community: 12 villages, 233 households, consisting of 528 men and 572 women, totalling 1,100 souls
- the Arkhoti (Akhieli) community: 3 villages, 78 households, consisting of 123 men and 133 women, totalling 256 souls

1935(?) TOTAL: 43 villages, 769 households, consisting of 1,492 men and 1,668 women, in all 3,160 souls.

There are, of course, many reasons for which a comparison of these two censuses would be a tricky and to some extent pointless exercise. For what it is worth, however, such a comparison does confirm a process of rural exodus during the late nineteenth and early twentieth centuries whereby the Khevsurs seem to have abandoned isolated or higher-altitude settlements and moved down-valley to live in villages benefiting from more clement climatic conditions (or perhaps even to live in towns further afield).

Although these figures must of course be taken with a pinch of salt (in the sense that they are based upon data whose reliability is unproven and debatable to say the least), a comparison between the two years (1873 and 1935) reveals

- a 14 per cent drop in the average number of men per household;
- an 8 per cent drop in the average number of women per household;
- an 8 per cent drop in the average number of households (families) per village;
- a 19 per cent drop in the average number of inhabitants per village; and
- a 35 per cent decrease in the region's total population (with more isolated regions losing more inhabitants e.g. the Shatili community 42% and the Akhieli community 50% than the others lower down the valleys).

== Migration ==
Some disobedience offered by the Khevsurs to the Soviet ideology was a reason for obligatory migration to the plain initiated by the government in 1951. As a result, many high-mountainous villages were deserted. Economic hardship of the last two decades also increased a tendency towards migration.

== See also ==
- Georgian people
- History of Georgia
- Culture of Georgia
