= Aragvispiri =

Aragvispiri არაგვისპირი
- Location in Georgia Aragvispiri (Georgia)
- Coordinates: 42°04′33″N 44°45′05″E
- Country: Georgia
- Region: Mtskheta-Mtianeti
- Municipality: Dusheti
- Elevation: 700 m (2,300 ft)

Population (2014)
  - Total: 907
- Time zone: UTC+4 (Georgian Time)

Aragvispiri (Georgian: არაგვისპირი) is a village in north-eastern Georgia. It is located in the Dusheti District, Mtskheta-Mtianeti region.
