= George Papashvily =

Georgian-American writer and sculptor

George Papashvily (Georgian: გიორგი პაპაშვილი; August 23, 1898 – March 29, 1978) was a Georgian-American writer and sculptor. He was one of the most famous Georgian emigrant artists of the 20th century.

== Life ==
George Papashvily was the son of Vanno Papashvily and Iamze Osepashvili, who were farmers in the village of Kobiaantkari, Dusheti District, Mtskheta-Mtianeti region of the modern Republic of Georgia, which was then under the rule of the House of Romanov. According to his autobiographical first book, Papashvily apprenticed as a swordmaker and ornamental leatherworker. After serving as a sniper with the Imperial Russian Army during World War I, he returned to the newly independent Democratic Republic of Georgia. Papashviliy fought in the Georgian Army under the command of General Giorgi Kvinitadze against the 1921 Red Army invasion and, after defeat on the battlefield and the Soviet annexation of his country, he fled to Istanbul around 1921, where he lived for two years. Papashvily immigrated to the United States circa 1923–1924, and lived and worked there for the rest of his life. Papashvily succeeded both as a sculptor and as an author; he was also a gifted engineer and inventor.

Papashvily met Helen Waite in 1930, while she was managing a bookstore in Berkeley, California. They married in 1933. After a brief stint in New York City, George and Helen bought a farm and settled in Quakertown, Pennsylvania. Together, the Papashvilys wrote several books, often based on his life experiences. Their first book was Anything Can Happen, which humorously recounted Papashvily's experiences as a penniless immigrant. Originally published in a serialized format in Common Ground and Direction magazines, this book was co-selected for the Book of the Month Club and was a best-seller, selling more than 600,000 copies in the U.S. and 1.5 million worldwide. It was translated into 15 foreign languages, including Georgian (in 1966). Papashvily died in 1978 in Cambria, California.

== Books by George and Helen Papashvily ==
- Anything Can Happen (1945)
- Yes and No Stories - A Book of Georgian Folk Tales (1946)
- Dogs and People (1954)
- Thanks to Noah (1956, in Georgian: 1971)
- Home and Home Again (1973, recounting a trip they made in the 1960s back his village of birth)
- Russian Cooking (1969)

== Film adaptation ==
Anything Can Happen was adapted into a 1952 film of the same name, starring Jose Ferrer as George and Kim Hunter as Helen. The film won a Golden Globe for Promoting International Understanding.

== Art ==
With no formal training, Papashvily began carving in 1940. He soon developed a signature style that was a combination of naive and modern. He carved directly in wood and stone, sculpting free-standing figures and bas relief. His favorite subjects came from nature: animals, flowers, and an occasional human figure. Among his most famous works are:

- War's End (1946)
- Pigeons (1948, Hazleton Art League)
- Ram (1951)
- Butterfly (1952, Woodmere Art Gallery)
- Horse (1955, National Art Gallery of the Republic of Georgia)
- Animal (1957, Reading Public Museum and Art Gallery)
- Apple (1959)
- Library Bears (1966, Fox Chase Branch, Free Library of Philadelphia)
- Bear Cub with Frog (1966, West Oak Lane Branch, Free Library of Philadelphia)
- Otter (1975, Children's Literature Research Collection, Free Library of Philadelphia)

Papashvily exhibited widely in solo exhibitions and with painters who were his friends.

== See also ==
- List of Georgians
- List of Georgian writers
- List of sculptors
- Culture of Georgia

== Literature about George Papashvily ==
- American Artist magazine, October, 1955.
- George Papashvily: Sculptor, a retrospective catalogue with an introduction by Charles H. Muhlenberg, Pennsylvania, 1979.
