= Shaburidze =

Noble family of Georgia

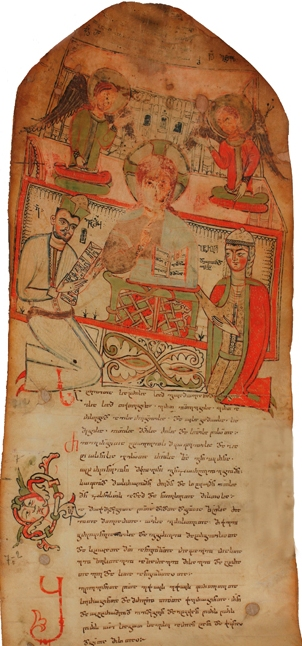
Document of donation by the eristavi Vameq Shaburisdze to the Bodorna church. 1494

The Shaburidze family (Georgian: შაბურიძე) was a Georgian noble family, which claimed descent from the Sasanian dynasty of ancient Persia and to which belonged the Duchy of Aragvi from the 13th century to the 15th.

== History ==
According to traditional accounts, the family descended from a high-ranking captive Muslim prince, possibly of the Shaddadid house, brought in Georgia by King George III in the 1060s. The family, in the person of Mihai Shaburisdze, is first mentioned in a document of 1380.

The Shaburidze were enfeoffed by the Georgian crown with a duchy in the upper Aragvi valley in northeast Georgia, and grew influential enough to produce dynastic marriages with the Royal House of Georgia. Thus, an unnamed noblewoman of the Shaburidze clan became the queen consort of Vakhtang III (r. 1302–1308), while a daughter of George VIII, previously betrothed to Constantine XI Palaiologos, the last Byzantine emperor, who perished in the fall of Constantinople, subsequently married Giorgi Shaburidze, son of Vameq, Duke of Aragvi, as is revealed by the latter's charter of 1465. By the late 15th century, however, the family had twice lost their duchy, the last time permanently and to the House of Tumanidze, for in his charter of June 28, 1474, granted to the church of the Nativity of Our Lady at Bodorna, Vameq Shaburidze refers to himself as "duke in name only." Their descendants appear as the Baron (Aznauri) Shaburishvili (შაბურიშვილი), and Shaburov (Russian: Шабуров), a branch established in the Russian Empire in the 18th century.
