= Alexander Roinashvili =

First Georgian photographer

- ალექსანდრე როინაშვილი
- Alexander Roinashvili in 1898
- Born: 1846; Dusheti, Dusheti uezd, Russian Empire
- Died: 1898 (aged 51–52); Tiflis, Russian Empire
- Other names: Alexander Solomonovich Roinov (Russified name)
- Occupation: Photographer

Alexander Roinashvili (Georgian: ალექსანდრე როინაშვილი; also known by his Russified name, Alexander Solomonovich Roinov, Russian: Александр Соломонович Роинов; 1846–1898) was the first Georgian photographer. He is known for his photos of the Caucasian landscapes and portraits of contemporary Georgian intellectuals.

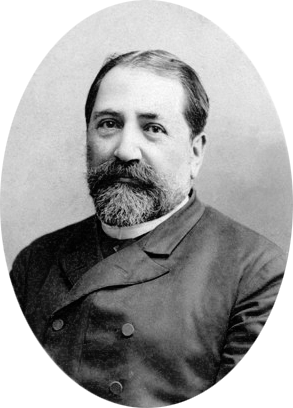
Photograph of Ilia Chavchavadze by Alexander Roinashvili

Born in the mountainous community of Dusheti, east Georgia, then part of the Russian Empire, Roinashvili took photographic classes at the Khlamov studio in Tiflis. He began his career as a photographer in Tiflis in 1865 and soon set up his own studio. Closely associated with the Georgian national movement, he was involved in documenting cultural heritage in Georgia and organized a mobile museum of photography which toured across the Caucasus and Russia proper.
