= Helen Papashvily =

American author

Helen Waite Papashvily (December 24, 1906 – May 19, 1996) was an American writer.

== Life and career ==
Born in Stockton, California as Helen Watson, she attended the University of California, Berkeley. She met her husband, George Papashvily in 1930, while she was managing a bookstore in Berkeley. The two married in 1933. After a brief stint in New York City, George and Helen bought a farm and settled in Quakertown, Pennsylvania.

In 1940, Papashvily opened the Moby Dick Bookshop located at 630 Turner St., Allentown, Pennsylvania. While book selling occupied her days, she spent her mornings writing articles and short stories for publications such as Good Housekeeping, Ladies' Home Journal, the Saturday Evening Post, and The New York Times. An editor at Harper's read her short story "The Sound of Home" published in Common Ground and approached her about turning it into a book. Working with her husband, Helen wrote Anything Can Happen (1945), a humorous account of George's experiences as a new immigrant in the United States. Anything Can Happen was a surprise hit, and was chosen as a Book of the Month Club selection in January 1945. In April 1945, an Armed Services Edition of the book was published and distributed to American troops fighting in World War II. Seven years later, Paramount bought the rights and turned the story into a movie that has no relationship to the book apart from the names of some of the characters. Directed by George Seaton, the film starred José Ferrer as George and Kim Hunter as Helen. The story tells of the arrival of a Georgian immigrant to America in the 1930s, and the moral of the story is that people should be more tolerant of those who were born elsewhere.

After Anything Can Happen, Papashvily wrote a number of other books with George including Yes and No Stories (1946), Thanks to Noah (1951), Dogs and People (1954), and Home and Home Again (1973). The two even wrote a book on Georgian cooking, which was published by Time-Life books in 1969. Papashvily also wrote several books on her own. Papashvily used her fame as a writer to advocate for public libraries. She spoke at library meetings across the country and was a member of the Friends of the Allentown Public Library and the Friends of the Lehigh University Libraries.

In 1985, Papashvily received an honorary doctor of humane letters degree from Lehigh University. A year later, she was chosen by Governor Dick Thornburgh as a Distinguished Daughter of Pennsylvania, citing her approach to race and her work with libraries.

Papashvily had no children. She died in California in 1996.

== Selected works ==
- Helen Papashvily, "The Treasures," The English Journal 35:6 (June 1946), 294–297.
- Helen Papashvily, "The World in a California Street: Stockton, 1911–1920," Western Folklore 10:2 (April 1951), 117–125.
- Helen Papashvily, All the Happy Endings; A Study of the Domestic Novel in America (New York: Harper, 1956).
- Helen Papashvily, "Cooking with God's Plenty," The Saturday Evening Post, August 11, 1962, 64–67.
- Helen Papashvily, Louisa May Alcott (Boston: Houghton Mifflin, 1965).

== See also ==
- George Papashvily§Books by George and Helen Papashvily
