= Ganesh Rango Bhide =

Indian encyclopaedist (1909–1981)

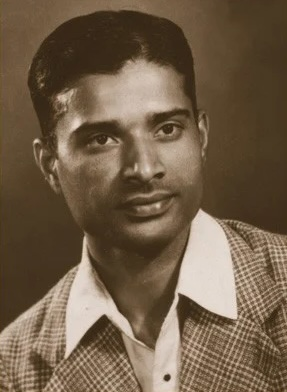
- Born: 6 June 1909; Ashta, Sangli
- Died: 8 June 1981 (aged 72); Bombay
- Occupation: Encyclopaedist

Ganesh Rango Bhide (6 June 1909 – 8 June 1981) was an Indian encyclopaedist.

== Early life ==
Ganesh Rango Bhide was born in Ashta, Sangli. He spent the majority of his life residing in Kolhapur. He completed his education up to the Master of Arts (M.A.) and Bachelor of Education (B.E.) levels.

== Career ==
Following his matriculation, Bhide worked at the Prabhat Film Company. While working there, he studied books on weaving and culinary arts, as well as a household encyclopedia, which led him to realize the necessity of similar literature in the Marathi language. Motivated by this idea, he compiled a list of approximately 35 subjects within two days. On 20 April 1931, the Vyavaharik Dnyankosh Mandal (Practical Encyclopedia Committee) was established under the chairmanship of M. T. Patwardhan. This committee was incorporated as a limited company on 20 March 1933, and the inaugural volume of the encyclopedia was published in 1935. Around 1932, Bhide also established Cinemasrushti, which was the first Marathi periodical dedicated to motion pictures.

Bhide traveled extensively to the local markets to sell the Vyavaharik Dnyankosh. The term vyavaharik denoted the provision of practical knowledge necessary for daily life. The encyclopedia was distinguished by its high-quality writing, inclusion of illustrations and biographical entries, durable binding, and low cost. Bhide later planned to publish a three-volume children's encyclopedia titled Balkosh, though only its first volume was released in 1942.

During the post-independence era, Bhide conceptualized a new knowledge-based encyclopedia named Abhinav Marathi Dnyankosh. With financial assistance of ten thousand rupees from the Central Government, five volumes of this encyclopedia were successfully published. In addition to his encyclopedia projects, Bhide worked in journalism as a correspondent for the Pune-based daily newspapers Kesari and Trikal. He was also associated with periodicals such as Sevak, Pudhari, and Ushakal.

== Selected publications ==
Bhide authored and compiled multiple reference works and books throughout his career. His major encyclopedia volumes include Vyavaharik Dnyankosh (Volumes 1–5, published between 1935 and 1940), Balkosh (Volume 1, 1942), and Abhinav Dnyankosh (Volumes 1–5, published between 1963 and 1979). His other independent books include Photo Kase Ghyavet?, Savarkarsutre, Kolhapur Darshan (published in 1971 with the assistance of P. L. Deshpande), and Kalamaharshi Baburao Painter (published in 1978).

== Death ==
Bhide died in Bombay on 8 June 1981 from leukemia.
