= Anything Can Happen =

1952 American film by George Seaton

- Theatrical release poster
- Directed by: George Seaton
- Written by: George Seaton; George Oppenheimer
- Based on: Anything Can Happen by George Papashvily and Helen Papashvily
- Produced by: William Perlberg
- Starring: José Ferrer; Kim Hunter; Kurt Kasznar; Oscar Beregi, Sr.
- Cinematography: Daniel L. Fapp
- Edited by: Alma Macrorie
- Music by: Victor Young
- Production company: Perlberg-Seaton Productions
- Distributed by: Paramount Pictures
- Release dates: April 3, 1952 (New York); May 1, 1952 (Los Angeles)
- Running time: 107 minutes
- Country: United States
- Language: English

Anything Can Happen is a 1952 American comedy-drama film directed by George Seaton and starring José Ferrer and Kim Hunter.

== Plot ==
Papashvily is an immigrant on New York's bustling Lower East Side. His friend Nuri, who had arrived in New York earlier and speaks English, leads the way, promising Giorgi an outdoor job with plenty of fresh air. They instead find themselves carrying buckets and pouring hot tar on rooftops.

Giorgi, who did not speak a word of English when he arrived, works diligently to learn the language, practicing in the mirror. He shares a house with fellow Georgians. Cited by the police for picking flowers in Central Park, he refuses to pay the fine and tells the judge what happened. The judge is impressed by his honesty and character and finds him not guilty after the police officer admits that he did not actually witness Giorgi picking any flowers.

Giorgi catches the eye of pretty court reporter Helen Watson, who is also moved by Giorgi's simple but eloquent defense. She invites him to her house to identify some folk music, and they become close friends. Through Helen's work recording folk music, Giorgi locates his musician uncle John. Giorgi moves into John's house, which he shares with a colorful group of fellow Georgian emigrés. Giorgi dreams of becoming an American citizen and dreams of marrying Helen, but he lacks confidence in the area of romance.

Just when Giorgi is about to reveal his feelings for Helen, she announces that she needs to travel to California to care for a sick aunt who had raised her. Months later, Helen has not returned and John encourages Giorgi to go to California. John quits his job and accompanies Giorgi to Southern California, where they connect with a reclusive fellow Georgian. Giorgi purchases a house and farm that he cannot afford and becomes an orange-tree farmer. However, something appears to have changed with Helen, who has taken a job. She confesses to her bedridden aunt that she is unsure of her feelings for Giorgi.

A frost arrives and threatens to ruin the orange crop. Helen rushes to the farm and orders everyone to light fires to keep the crops warm. Giorgi, deeply moved, asks Helen to marry him, and she accepts. Nuri and his friends arrive from New York. John is gravely ill but becomes a citizen before dying.

== Cast ==
- José Ferrer as Giorgi
- Kim Hunter as Helen
- Kurt Kasznar as Nuri Bey
- Oscar Beregi, Sr. as Uncle John
- Eugenie Leontovich as Anna
- Oskar Karlweis as Uncle Besso
- Mikhail Rasumny as Tariel Godiedze
- Nick Dennis as Chancho
- Gloria Marlowe as Luba Godiedze
- Otto Waldis as Sandro
- George Voskovec as Pavli
- Alexander Danaroff as Eliko Tomavily
- Natasha Lytess as Madame Greshiani

== Production ==
The screenplay for Anything Can Happen is based on a 1945 bestselling biographical novel by Helen and George Papashvily. RKO Radio Pictures acquired the screen rights soon after the book's publication and envisioned the project as a vehicle for Frank Sinatra. The project languished for six years before Paramount Pictures obtained the rights from RKO.

Opera star Robert Merrill tested for the leading role. José Ferrer and Nancy Olson were announced as the male and female leads in January 1951.

George Papashvily served as a technical adviser and appears in the film as an extra.

== Reception ==
In a contemporary review for The New York Times, critic Bosley Crowther called Anything Can Happen "a rambling and sentimental film" and wrote: "Mr. Seaton has borrowed and invented a series of episodes that are quaintly sentimental and romantic but they have the strong flavor of myth. Furthermore, they are strung together in such a loose and senseless way and are played with such calculated cuteness that the monotony of them palls."

Critic Philip K. Scheuer of the Los Angeles Times wrote: "[T]he descriptive word that leaps first into the mind of the mellowed reviewer is his old dependable heartwarming."

Variety called the film "a heart-warming comedy, engagingly acted, slickly produced and directed."

== Awards ==
Anything Can Happen won a Golden Globe award for Promoting International Understanding.
