= Dusheti =

Dusheti დუშეთი
- Town
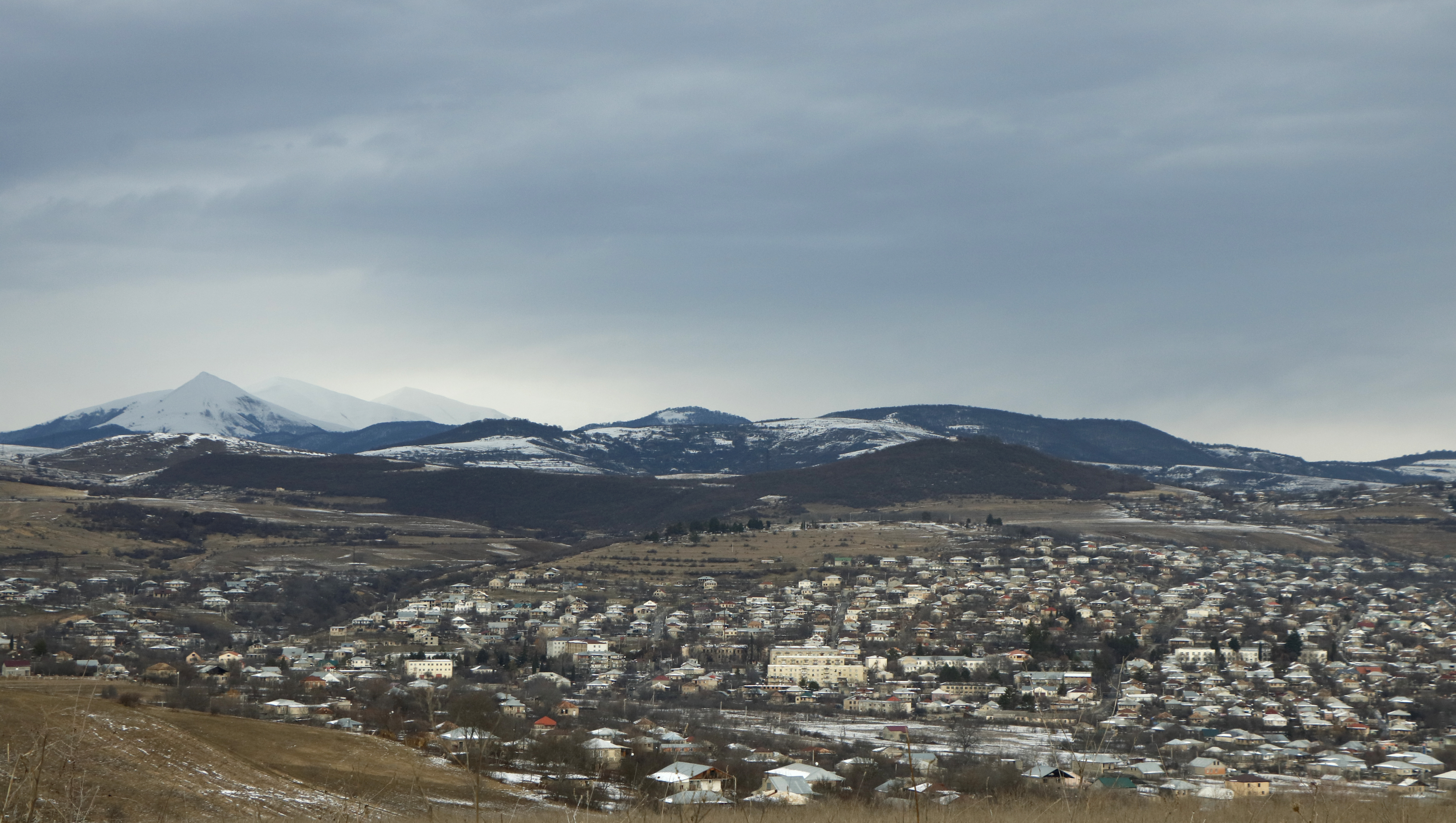

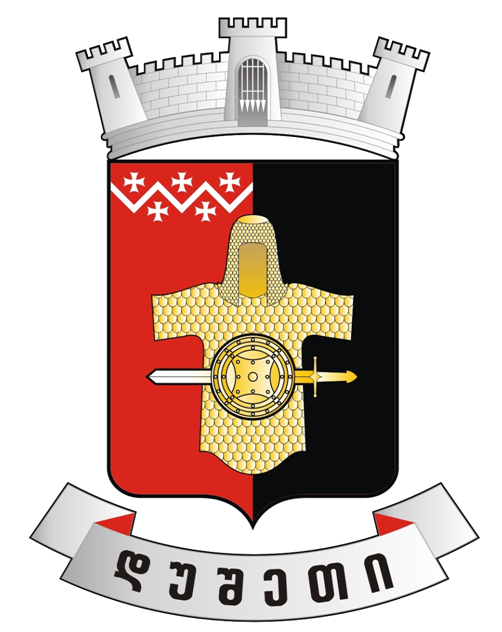
- Coat of arms

- Location of Dusheti in Georgia Dusheti (Mtskheta-Mtianeti)
- Coordinates: 42°5′0″N 44°42′0″E
- Country: Georgia
- Mkhare: Mtskheta-Mtianeti
- Municipality: Dusheti
- Elevation: 900 m (3,000 ft)

Population (2024)
  - Total: 7,238
- Time zone: UTC+4 (Georgian Time)

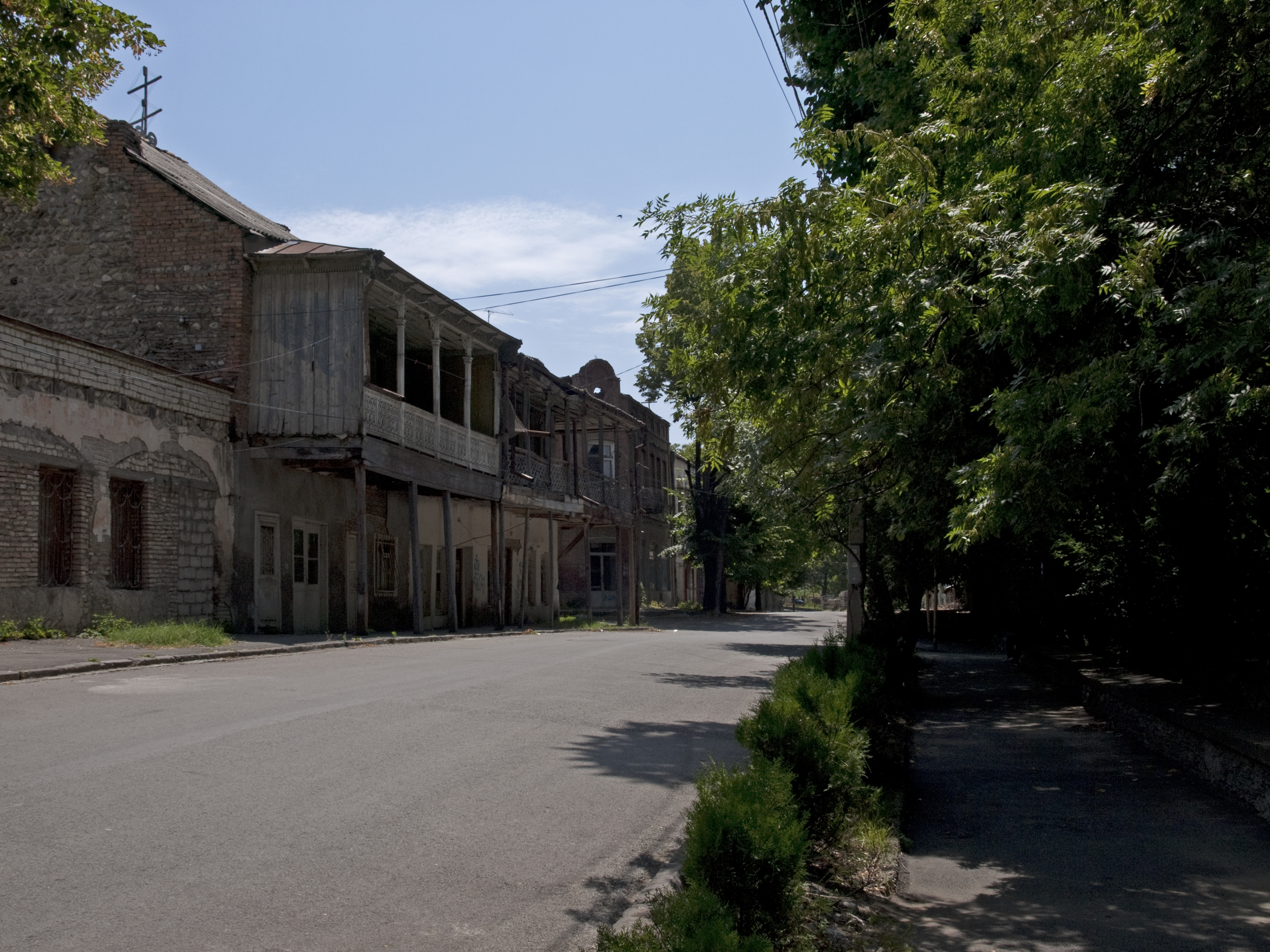
Balconies in Old Dusheti

Dusheti (Georgian: დუშეთი) is a town in Georgia, the administrative center of Dusheti Municipality, in the Mtskheta-Mtianeti region. It is the residence of the Tsilkni Eparchy.

== Geography ==
Dusheti is on both banks of the small, mountainous Dushetis-Khevi River in the foothills of the Greater Caucasus range at an elevation of 900 m. The town is 33 km north of Mtskheta and 54 km northeast from the capital Tbilisi. Dusheti has a moderately humid climate, with moderately cold winters and long warm summers.

=== Transport ===
The town is accessible via a paved road on the S3 highway (also known as the Georgian Military Road) connecting Tbilisi to Stepantsminda. There is regular bus traffic between the town and Tbilisi.

=== Climate ===
Climate data for Dusheti
Month	Jan	Feb	Mar	Apr	May	Jun	Jul	Aug	Sep	Oct	Nov	Dec	Year
Mean daily maximum °C (°F)	3 (37)	4.1 (39.4)	8.8 (47.8)	15.1 (59.2)	20.4 (68.7)	23.8 (74.8)	26.6 (79.9)	26.7 (80.1)	22.6 (72.7)	17 (63)	9.8 (49.6)	4.7 (40.5)	15.2 (59.4)
Daily mean °C (°F)	−1.5 (29.3)	−0.5 (31.1)	3.9 (39.0)	9.1 (48.4)	14.3 (57.7)	17.7 (63.9)	20.5 (68.9)	20.5 (68.9)	16.5 (61.7)	11.3 (52.3)	5.3 (41.5)	0.4 (32.7)	9.8 (49.6)
Mean daily minimum °C (°F)	−5.9 (21.4)	−5 (23)	−1 (30)	3.2 (37.8)	8.3 (46.9)	11.6 (52.9)	14.4 (57.9)	14.4 (57.9)	10.4 (50.7)	5.7 (42.3)	0.8 (33.4)	−3.8 (25.2)	4.4 (39.9)
Average precipitation mm (inches)	29 (1.1)	37 (1.5)	50 (2.0)	75 (3.0)	116 (4.6)	102 (4.0)	78 (3.1)	62 (2.4)	59 (2.3)	57 (2.2)	60 (2.4)	40 (1.6)	765 (30.2)
Source: Climate-Data.org

== History ==
Dusheti functions as the center of the Dusheti Municipality which, beyond the town itself, includes several villages of the historical community of Pkhovi, (Pshavi, and Khevsureti). As of the 2014 all-Georgia census, the town had a population of about 6,167.

Dusheti first appears in Georgian written records in 1215. In the 17th century, it served as a residence of the local mountainous lords – the dukes of Aragvi – whose defiance to the Georgian crown more than once led to invasions and devastation of the town by the royal troops. After the abolition of the duchy of Aragvi in the 1740s, Dusheti passed to the crown but significantly declined. In 1801, the Russians took over and granted Dusheti a town status. Next year, it became the center of Dusheti uezd. The town and its environs were a scene of disturbances during the Russian Revolution of 1905, the peasants’ revolt in 1918, and an armed clash during the 1924 August Uprising against the Soviet rule. Dusheti was a center of agriculture and light industry during the Soviet era, but suffered an economic decline and population decrease in the years following the disintegration of the Soviet Union. Nowadays, most people work in service industries (banking, education, auto-repair, and retail) as well as subsistence farming. The town is also known for its khinkali, a meat-filled dumpling very popular in Georgia.

== Culture and recreation ==
There are several historical and recreational places in and around Dusheti such as the Ananuri castle and the Bazaleti Lake. The town itself houses a number of architectural monuments including the 9th-10th-century church of St. George and the 18th-century palace of the Chilashvili family. It also is the location of a museum housing archaeological and other items from the Dusheti context.

== Politics and governance ==
Dusheti is governed by a municipal administration, with the mayor as the head of the local government. The mayor is elected every four years in municipal elections and is responsible for overseeing local policies, infrastructure, and public services. As of 2025, the mayor of Dusheti is Manana Narimanidze, who has been in office since 2021.

== Demographics ==
As of the 2014 census, a total of 6,167 people live in Dusheti.

Historical population
Year	Pop.	±% p.a.
1882	2,041	—
1893	2,027	−0.06%
1910	2,105	+0.22%
1989	8,483	+1.78%
2002	7,315	−1.13%
2014	6,167	−1.41%
Source: Population data (1882 - 1910), (1989 and 2002) and 2014

== Notable people ==
- Nikolai Bugaev (1837–1903), Russian mathematician born in Georgia
- Shota Khinchagashvili (b. 1951), retired Georgian football player
- Alexander Roinashvili (1846–1898), first Georgian photographer

== Gallery ==
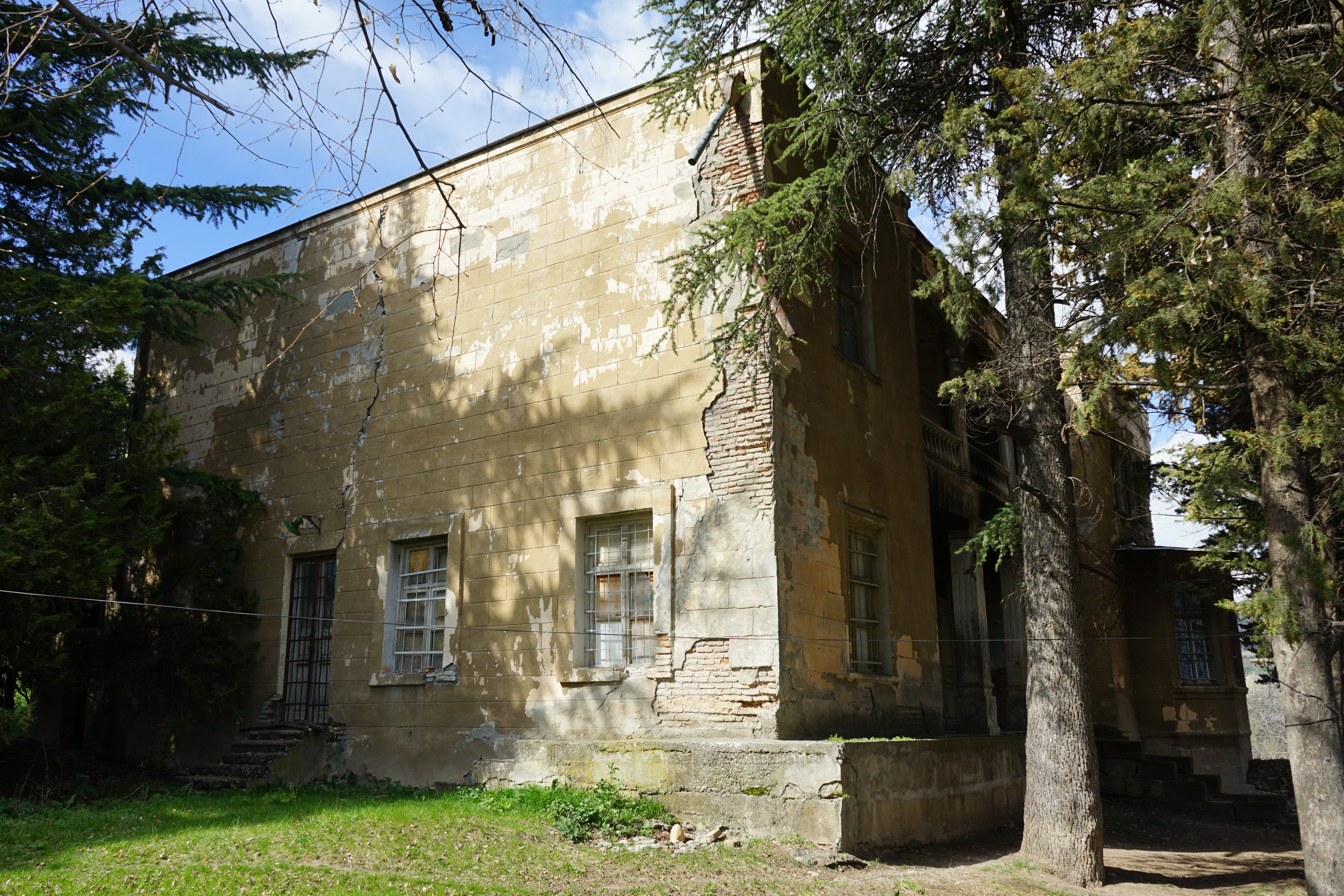
Dusheti Local Lore Museum

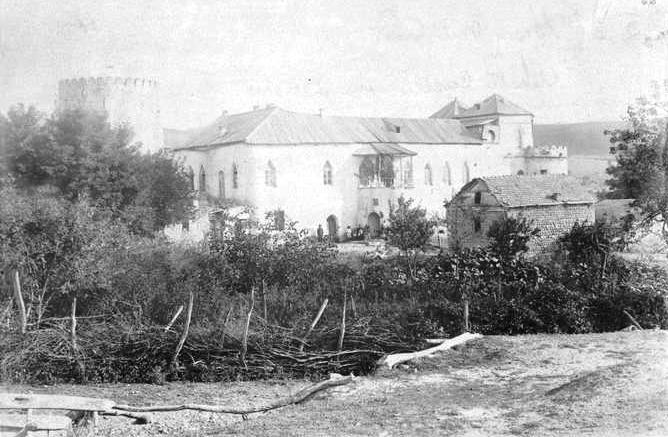
White castle in Dusheti along the Georgian Military Road

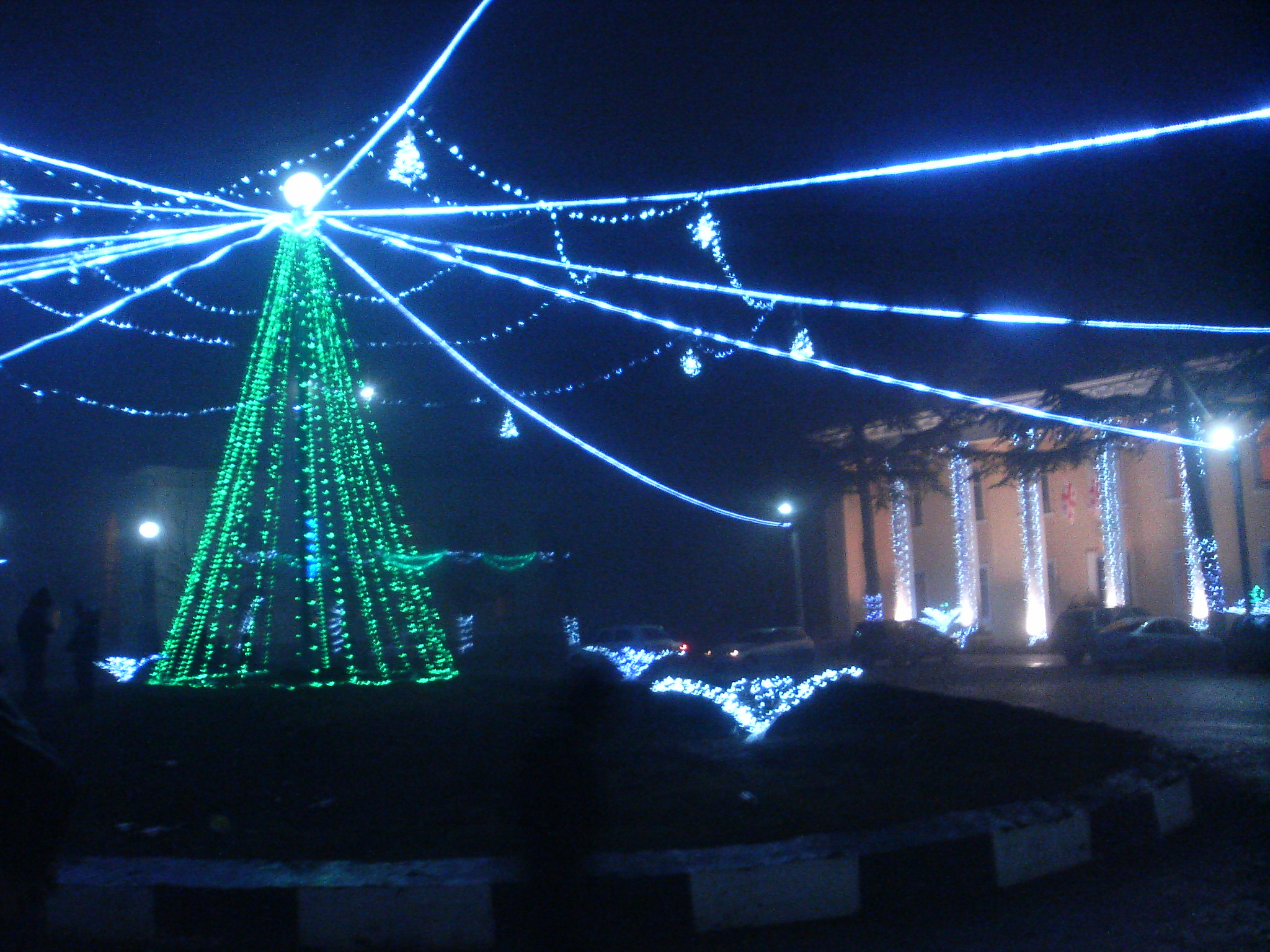
New Year celebration in the town

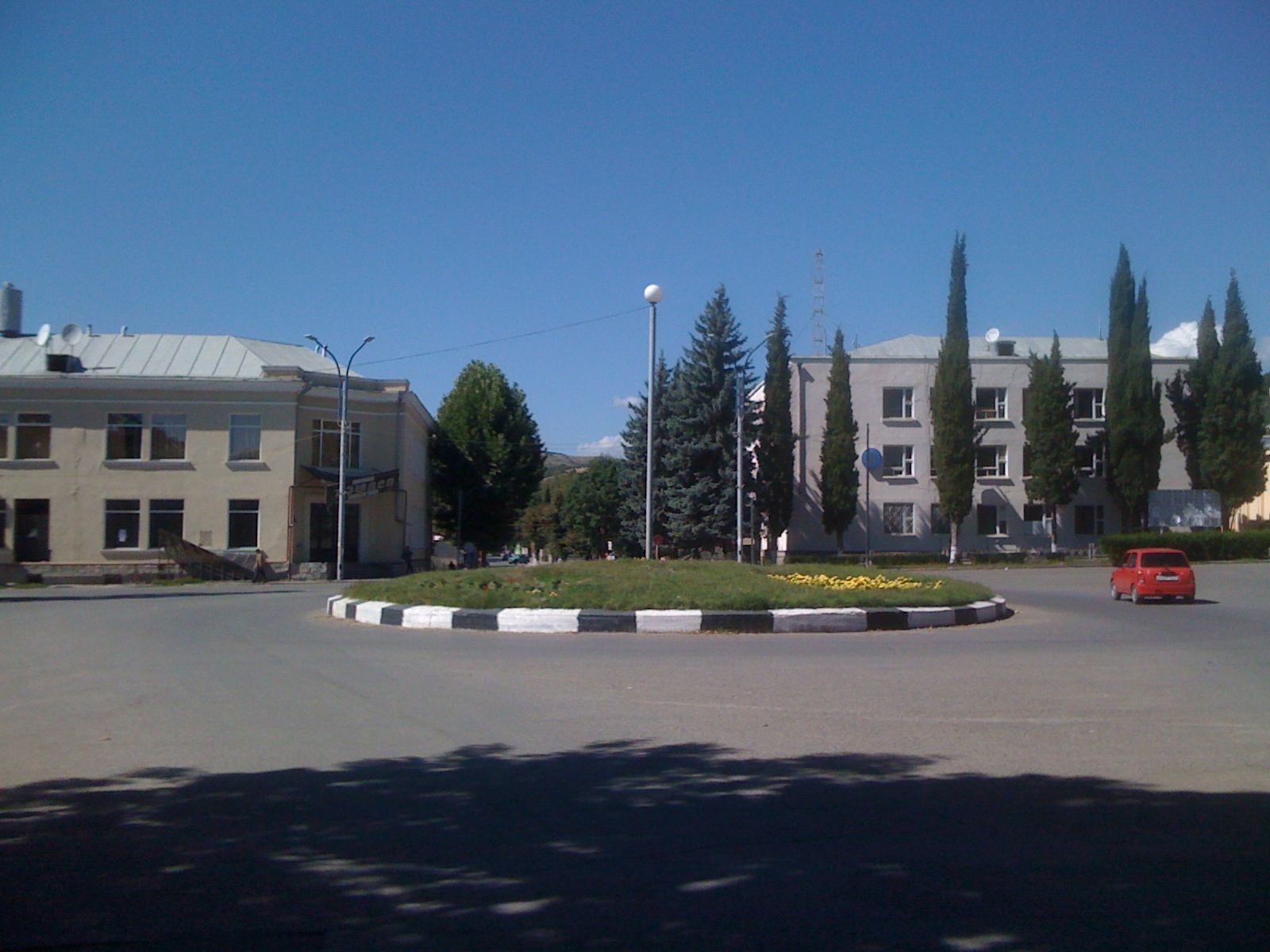
City center

Shrine of St. Gregory in the town
