= Dusheti Municipality =

Coordinates: 42°05′N 44°42′E

Dusheti Municipality დუშეთის მუნიციპალიტეტი
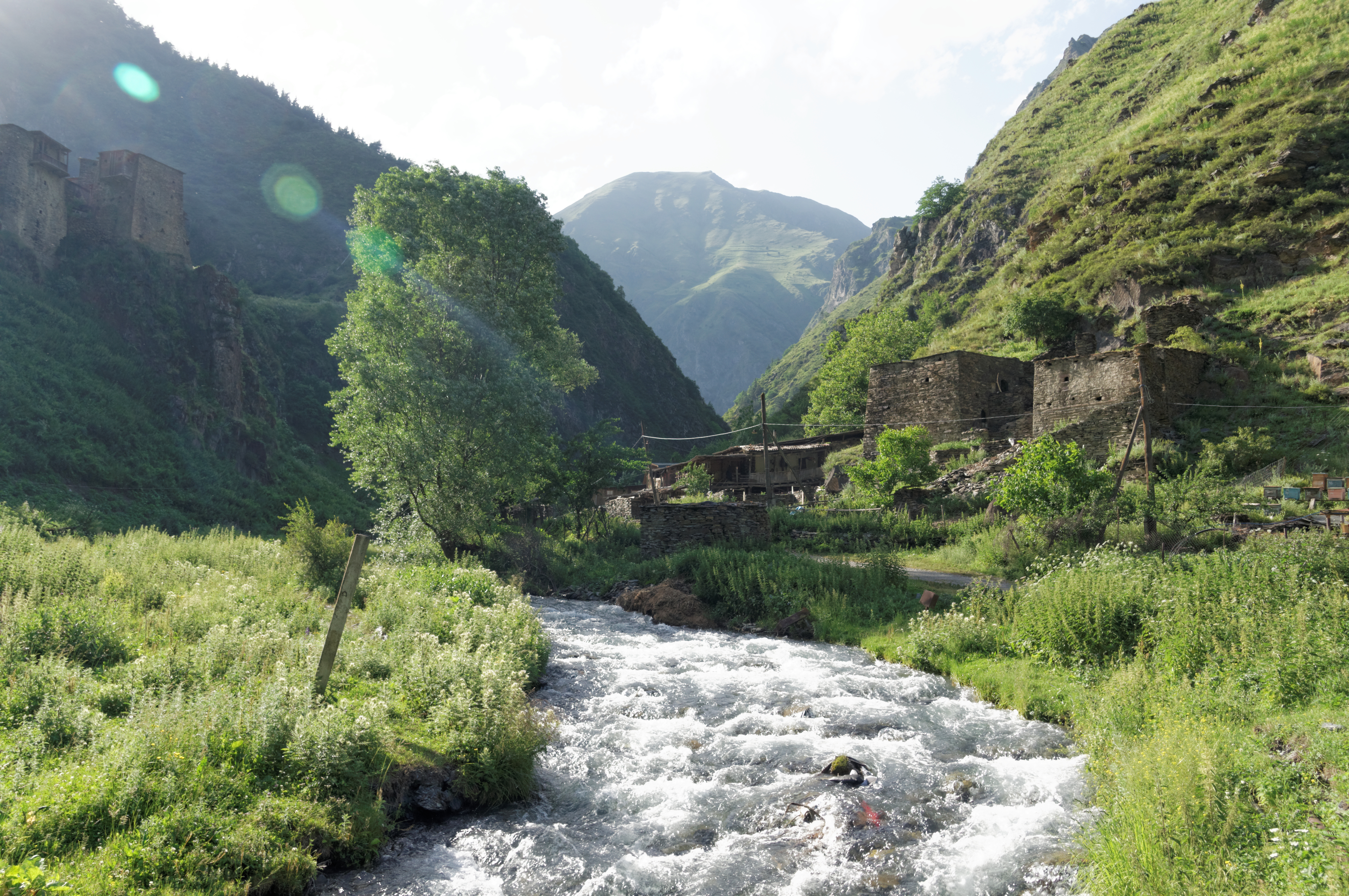
- Shatili

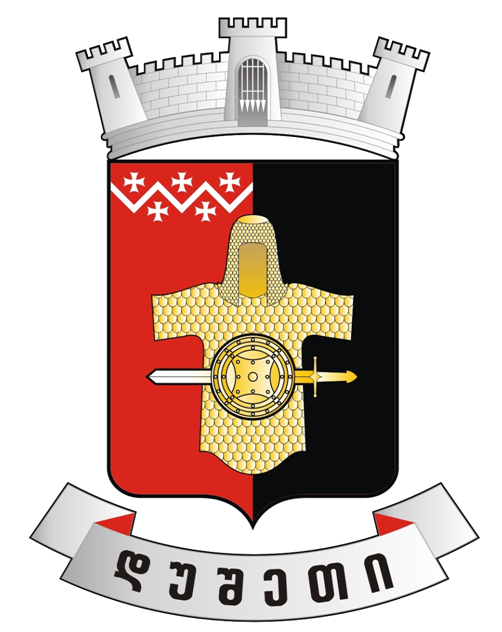
- Flag Seal

- Country: Georgia
- Mkhare: Mtskheta-Mtianeti
- capital city: Dusheti

Area
  - Total: 2,981.5 km^{2} (1,151.2 sq mi)

Population (2014)
  - Total: 25,659
  - Density: 8.61/km^{2} (22.3/sq mi)
- Time zone: UTC+4 (Georgian Time)
- Website: https://dusheti.gov.ge/ka

Dusheti (Georgian: დუშეთის მუნიციპალიტეტი) is a municipality of Georgia, in the region of Mtskheta-Mtianeti. It has a population of 25,659 and an area of 2,981.5 km^{2}. Municipality main town is Dusheti.

== Settlements ==
Rank	Settlement	Population
1	Dusheti	6 167
2	Pasanauri	1 148
3	Aragvispiri	907
4	Abanoskhevi	399
5	Kobiaantkari	399
6	Bodorna	140
7	Tsitsamuri	124
8	Shatili	22
9	Mutso	15
10	Khonischala	3

== Geography ==
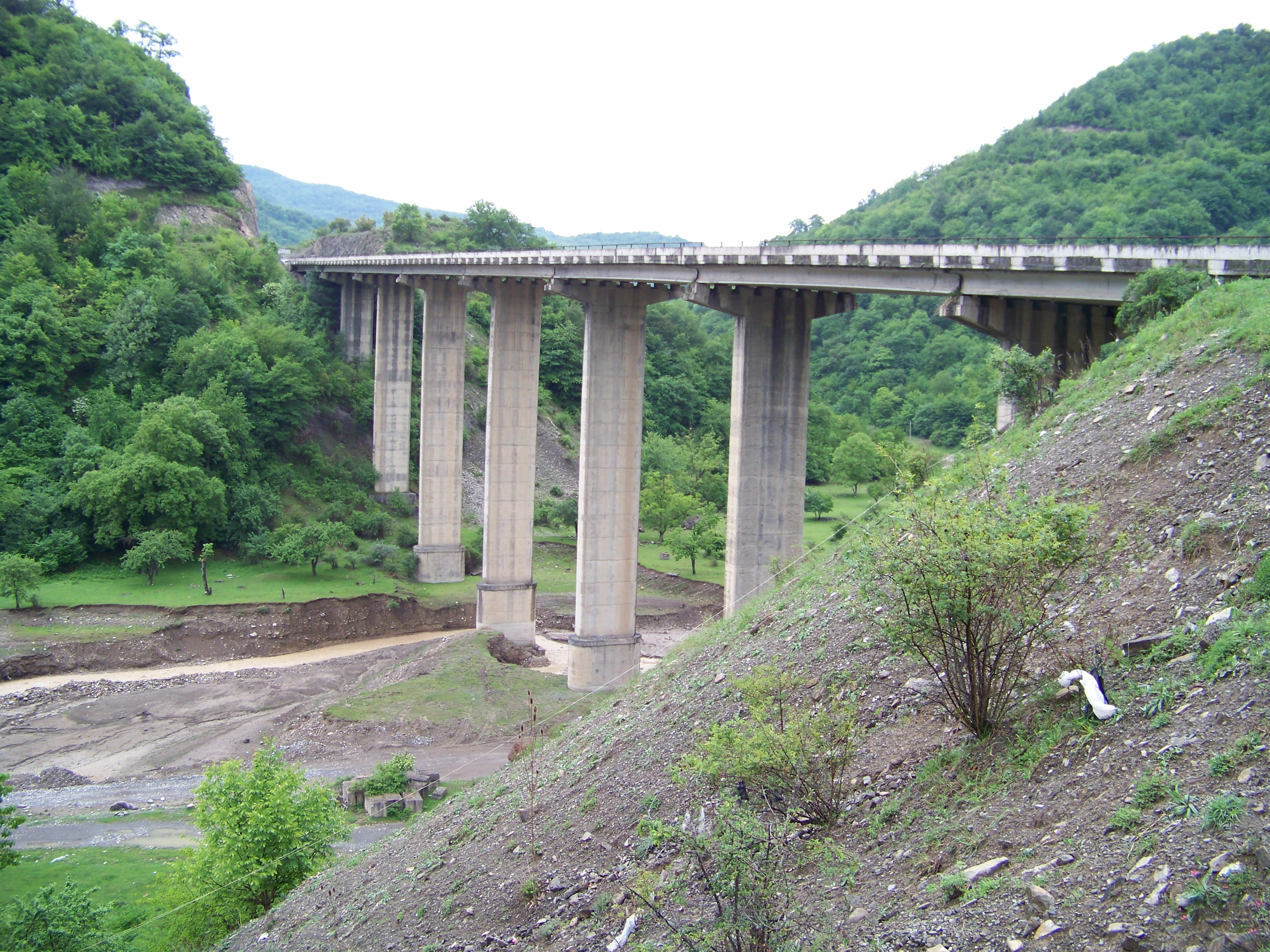
Ananuri Bridge

Dusheti Municipality borders with the Kazbegi Municipality in the northwest, the Tianeti Municipality in the east and the Mtskheta Municipality in the south, all in the same Mtskheta-Mtianeti region. In the northeast Dusheti Municipality borders with the Akhmeta Municipality in the Kakheti region, in the southwest with the Kaspi Municipality and in the west de jure with the Akhalgori Municipality (on the territory of the de facto independent, South Ossetia, known there as Leningor District), is located in the Shida Kartli (Inner Kartli) region. In the north, the municipality is bordered by the state border with Russia, with the Ingushetia in the western part and the Chechnya in the east.

== Politics ==
Dusheti Municipal Assembly (Georgian: დუშეთის საკრებულო) is a representative body in Dusheti Municipality, currently consisting of 33 members. The council assembles into session regularly to consider subject matters such as code changes, utilities, taxes, city budget, city government oversight, and more. Dusheti sakrebulo is elected every four years. The last election was held in October 2021.

Party	2017	2021	Current Municipal Assembly
Georgian Dream	24	23	
United National Movement	2	5	
For Georgia		2	
Lelo		1	
Labour Party	2	1	
Alliance of Patriots	4	1	
European Georgia	1		
Independent	1		
Total	34	33	

== See also ==
- municipalities of Georgia
- Administrative divisions of Georgia
